= Elections in Malaysia =

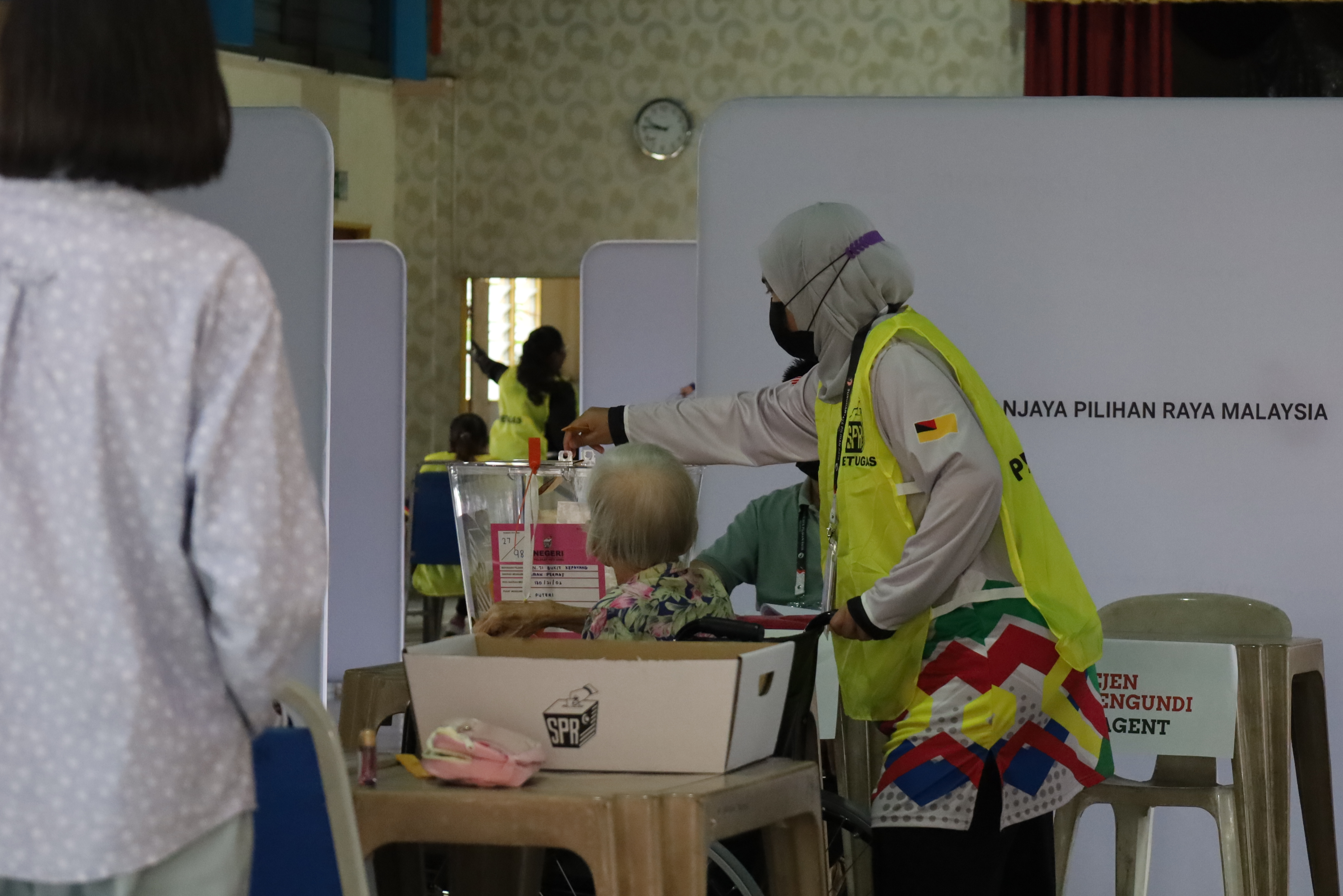
An Election Commission worker assists a senior citizen in casting her vote during the 2026 Negeri Sembilan state election.

Elections in Malaysia include elections to public office of the political entities that since 1963 have composed the federation of Malaysia. At present, elections in Malaysia exist at two levels: federal level and state level. Federal level elections are those for membership in the Dewan Rakyat, the lower house of Parliament, while state level elections are for membership in the various State Legislative Assemblies. The heads of executive branch at both the federal and state levels, the Prime Minister and Menteri Besar/Chief Ministers respectively, are usually indirectly elected, filled by a member of the majority party/coalition in the respective legislatures.

While any state may dissolve its assembly independently of the Federal Parliament, the traditional practice is for most state assemblies to be dissolved at the same time as Parliament, with the exception of Sabah and Sarawak, although these two states had held elections simultaneously with the rest of the country, as it is the case for Sabah in elections from 2004 to 2018, and Sarawak in the 1969 and 1974 elections. The practice of holding simultaneous elections was disrupted following the 2020–2022 Malaysian political crisis, with only three states holding state elections at the same time as the 2022 parliamentary general election.

== Latest election ==
| Party or alliance | | Votes | % | Seats |
|---|---|---|---|---|
| Pakatan Harapan | People's Justice Party (Malaysia) | 2,442,038 | 15.72 | 31 |
| Pakatan Harapan | Democratic Action Party | 2,422,577 | 15.59 | 40 |
| Pakatan Harapan | National Trust Party (Malaysia) | 884,384 | 5.69 | 8 |
| Pakatan Harapan | Malaysian United Democratic Alliance | 74,392 | 0.48 | 1 |
| Pakatan Harapan | United Progressive Kinabalu Organisation | 72,751 | 0.47 | 2 |
| Pakatan Harapan | Total | 5,896,142 | 37.95 | 82 |
| Perikatan Nasional | Pan-Malaysian Islamic Party | 2,259,353 | 14.54 | 43 |
| Perikatan Nasional | Malaysian United Indigenous Party | 2,102,151 | 13.53 | 31 |
| Perikatan Nasional | Parti Gerakan Rakyat Malaysia | 305,025 | 1.96 | 0 |
| Perikatan Nasional | Total | 4,666,529 | 30.04 | 74 |
| Barisan Nasional | United Malays National Organisation | 2,549,341 | 16.41 | 26 |
| Barisan Nasional | Malaysian Chinese Association | 665,436 | 4.28 | 2 |
| Barisan Nasional | Malaysian Indian Congress | 172,176 | 1.11 | 1 |
| Barisan Nasional | Parti Bersatu Rakyat Sabah | 23,877 | 0.15 | 1 |
| Barisan Nasional | Malaysian Indian Muslim Congress | 21,468 | 0.14 | 0 |
| Barisan Nasional | Malaysia Makkal Sakti Party | 10,660 | 0.07 | 0 |
| Barisan Nasional | All Malaysian Indian Progressive Front | 7,387 | 0.05 | 0 |
| Barisan Nasional | Love Malaysia Party | 5,417 | 0.03 | 0 |
| Barisan Nasional | Total | 3,455,762 | 22.24 | 30 |
| Gabungan Parti Sarawak | Parti Pesaka Bumiputera Bersatu | 343,954 | 2.21 | 14 |
| Gabungan Parti Sarawak | Sarawak United Peoples' Party | 167,063 | 1.08 | 2 |
| Gabungan Parti Sarawak | Progressive Democratic Party (Malaysia) | 84,045 | 0.54 | 2 |
| Gabungan Parti Sarawak | Parti Rakyat Sarawak | 67,539 | 0.43 | 5 |
| Gabungan Parti Sarawak | Total | 662,601 | 4.26 | 23 |
| Heritage Party (Malaysia) | | 300,497 | 1.93 | 3 |
| Gabungan Rakyat Sabah | Gabungan Rakyat Sabah | 94,085 | 0.61 | 4 |
| Gabungan Rakyat Sabah | United Sabah Party | 65,311 | 0.42 | 1 |
| Gabungan Rakyat Sabah | Homeland Solidarity Party | 29,874 | 0.19 | 1 |
| Gabungan Rakyat Sabah | Sabah Progressive Party | 5,054 | 0.03 | 0 |
| Gabungan Rakyat Sabah | Total | 194,324 | 1.25 | 6 |
| Gerakan Tanah Air | Homeland Fighter's Party | 88,726 | 0.57 | 0 |
| Gerakan Tanah Air | Parti Bumiputera Perkasa Malaysia | 12,061 | 0.08 | 0 |
| Gerakan Tanah Air | Pan-Malaysian Islamic Front | 4,252 | 0.03 | 0 |
| Gerakan Tanah Air | National Indian Muslim Alliance Party | 4,136 | 0.03 | 0 |
| Gerakan Tanah Air | Total | 109,175 | 0.70 | 0 |
| Sarawak United; People's Alliance | Parti Sarawak Bersatu | 57,579 | 0.37 | 0 |
| Sarawak United; People's Alliance | Parti Bansa Dayak Sarawak Baru | 3,053 | 0.02 | 0 |
| Sarawak United; People's Alliance | Parti Bumi Kenyalang | 2,311 | 0.01 | 0 |
| Sarawak United; People's Alliance | Total | 62,943 | 0.41 | 0 |
| Social Democratic Harmony Party | | 52,054 | 0.34 | 1 |
| Parti Bangsa Malaysia | | 16,437 | 0.11 | 1 |
| Socialist Party of Malaysia | Parti Rakyat Malaysia | 5,865 | 0.04 | 0 |
| Socialist Party of Malaysia | Socialist Party of Malaysia | 779 | 0.01 | 0 |
| Socialist Party of Malaysia | Total | 6,644 | 0.04 | 0 |
| Sarawak People's Awareness Party | | 1,036 | 0.01 | 0 |
| Sabah People's Unity Party | | 541 | 0.00 | 0 |
| People's First Party | | 264 | 0.00 | 0 |
| Independents | | 111,043 | 0.71 | 2 |
| Total | | 15,535,992 | 100.00 | 222 |

== Federal level ==
At the federal level, voters elect the 222-member House of Representatives (Malay: Dewan Rakyat, literally "Hall of the People") of the bicameral Parliament. Members are elected from single-member constituencies drawn based on population using the first past the post system. The party that has the majority of the House of Representatives will form the federal government.

The Constitution of Malaysia requires that a general election must be held at least once every five years. However, the Prime Minister can ask the Yang di-Pertuan Agong to dissolve the Parliament at any time before this five-year period has expired. A general election should be held no later than 60 days after the dissolution of the Parliament.

Since independence, the parliamentary elections have most often been won by the Barisan Nasional (National Front, abbreviated BN, and its predecessor, the Alliance), a coalition of fourteen parties. The 1969 election saw the first time the Alliance failed to attain a two-thirds majority in Parliament (two-thirds majority being the majority required to pass most constitutional amendments), which happened again in the 2008 and 2013 elections; the latter also saw the BN losing the popular vote while retaining the majority of seats. In the 2018 general elections, the Pakatan Harapan coalition defeated the BN at the federal level for the first time in history.

== State level ==
At the state level, voters elect representatives to the Dewan Undangan Negeri (State Legislative Assembly). The number of representatives varies between the different states, with as many as 82 electorates in Sarawak and as little as 15 in Perlis. Members are elected from single-member constituencies drawn based on population using the first-past-the-post system. The party that forms the majority of the state assembly will form the state government.

State assembly constituencies are smaller in area and population than the parliamentary constituencies. Each parliamentary constituency outside of the federal territories is subdivided into a number of state assembly constituencies, usually two or three but can be as many as six.

Traditionally, state elections are held simultaneously with the parliamentary election but each state can decide when to hold its election. This is because state assemblies are dissolved by their respective Ruler or governor on the advice of the chief minister of the state. For example, following the 1977 Kelantan Emergency, a snap election was called in Kelantan in March 1978, months ahead of the general election in July 1978. A more recent example is that in the 1999 general election, the state elections of the 11 states on Peninsular Malaysia were held simultaneously with the parliamentary election, while Sabah already had its state election months earlier and the Sarawak state assembly was not due for election until 2001. In the 2004 and 2008 general elections, the state election of Sabah were held simultaneously with the parliamentary election as well, but Sarawak held its state election in 2006 and 2011.

The practice of holding simultaneous elections was disrupted following the 2018 elections and the 2020–2022 Malaysian political crisis. Early state elections took place in Sabah (2020), Malacca (2021) and Johor (2022). Sarawak held its delayed state election in December 2021. When the 14th Parliament was dissolved on 10 October 2022 to make way for the 15th general election, six out of nine states with elections due in 2023 opted not to dissolve their state assemblies at the same time, leaving only three states (Pahang, Perak and Perlis) holding state elections concurrently with the parliamentary election.

Before the 2008 elections, the Barisan Nasional and its predecessor the Alliance controlled most of the state assemblies in every election, while occasionally losing some states, most notably Kelantan which was controlled by the Pan-Malaysian Islamic Party (PAS) from 1959 to 1978 (the last four years as part of BN) and again since 1990. The worst result for the Alliance was in 1969, when it lost its majority in Perak, Selangor and Penang in addition to Kelantan. In the 2008 elections, in addition to Kelantan, BN lost four states (Penang, Kedah, Perak and Selangor) to the loose coalition of opposition parties (later known as the Pakatan Rakyat (People's Pact, abbreviated PR)) composed of PAS, Democratic Action Party (DAP) and People's Justice Party (PKR). Perak was returned to BN control in 2009 following a constitutional crisis. In the 2013 elections, BN recaptured the state of Kedah, leaving Kelantan, Penang and Selangor in PR control.

Following the 2018 elections, the BN only retained control of the states of Perlis, Pahang and Sarawak. PAS retains Kelantan while capturing Terengganu. The Pakatan Harapan coalition retains control of Penang and Selangor as well as capturing the states of Kedah, Perak, Negeri Sembilan, Melaka and Johor. An informal alliance between Parti Warisan Sabah and Pakatan Harapan also took control of the state of Sabah. BN still remained governing the state of Sarawak, which they won in the state elections held in 2016, until the Sarawak BN parties left the coalition in 2018, thus forming Gabungan Parti Sarawak.

In 2023, after 2022 Malaysian general election held in 19 November 2022, an official local coalition of Gabungan Rakyat Sabah took control of the state of Sabah and the Gabungan Parti Sarawak remained governing the state of Sarawak. Meanwhile, an informal alliance between Pakatan Harapan and Barisan Nasional took control of West Malaysia.

== Local government elections ==
Although there used to be elections for members of local governments such as municipal councils, today, no local government elections are held in Malaysia. Local government elections were suspended after the Indonesia-Malaysia confrontation in 1964. The suspension was never lifted and instead made permanent under the Local Government Act 1976. Under the Act, or the laws of individual states where relevant, local government members are appointed by the state government.

After Minister and People's Progressive Party President M. Kayveas raised concerns about local governments in late 2005, some suggested reviving local government elections. However, in an opinion column of the New Straits Times (owned by the United Malays National Organisation or UMNO, leading party of the Barisan Nasional) quoted a professor from Universiti Kebangsaan Malaysia as saying that such elections would not be brought back because "policymakers know from experience worldwide that the Opposition tends to dominate such councils as part of the electorate's desire for checks-and-balances." The professor also stated that due to required constitutional changes, it would be difficult for such amendments to pass muster in Parliament. The column also quoted a government ministry as saying that "holding elections are expensive affairs".

As of 2008, the Pakatan Rakyat states' governments would like to implement the local government election in their states. However, these was not carried out due to the Federal Constitution which prohibits the implementation. It was only after Pakatan Harapan won the 2018 Malaysian general election that the new government began the process of looking into and reintroducing local elections after 55 years, with a trial run slated for 2019 in select cities.

== By-elections ==
In addition to general elections, a by-election occurs when a particular seat in the Dewan Rakyat becomes vacant. Such a vacancy can occur when, a member of parliament (MP) dies, and an MP is disqualified from being a member of the Dewan Rakyat; a seat is declared vacant because the MP has been absent from every sitting of the Dewan Rakyat for a period of six months without leave of the Dewan Rakyat, and the members of the Dewan Rakyat have decided to declare the seat vacant. The exception is if the vacancy occurs when the tenure for the current Parliament or state assembly is less than two years, where the seat is simply left vacant until the next general election.

== Electoral district boundaries ==
It is the role of the Election Commission to draw, review and re-delineate electoral district boundaries. The last delineation was made on 21 March 2003. As of 2013, there are a total of 222 parliamentary districts and 576 state assembly districts in Malaysia. The EC has been accused of practising gerrymandering during delineation exercises.

Under Article 113 of the Constitution of Malaysia, the EC may conduct a review and recommend changes to electoral boundaries at an interval of not less than 8 years from the last review and delineation.

== Election process ==
Elections are supervised by a seven-member Election Commission. Its members are appointed by the Yang di-Pertuan Agong following the advice of the Prime Minister.

=== Nomination process ===
Nomination centres are set up in various locations by the Election Commission to allow candidates to register themselves. Typically any Malaysian citizen may register as a candidate unless disqualified. Candidates file the appropriate forms and place a monetary deposit. The deposit was RM5000 to contest a parliamentary seat, or RM3000 to contest a state assembly seat. This amount was changed to RM 10,000 and RM 5,000 respectively in 2004. Additionally in 2004 it was required that each candidate provide a RM 5,000 deposit for cleaning up banners and posters after the election. This increase is seen by some as having led to the government winning a record number of seats without contest in 2004 (17 parliamentary seats were won without contest). The deposit is used to pay for infringements of election laws and is returned after polling day unless the candidate loses and fails to garner more than 1/8 of the vote.

As of the 2004 elections, candidates may have a lawyer present at these proceedings. Some candidates have been disqualified from previous elections as they lacked the competence to fill in the forms correctly.

In 2004 candidates were given 1-hour to fill in and return their nomination forms as opposed to 2 hours previously. This led to disqualification of certain candidates who were unaware of the change.

=== Campaigning ===
The campaign period permitted by law runs from the date of nomination day until polling day. Campaigning amongst opposition parties is often hampered by a lack of access to government-controlled media. Prior to the 1999 general election, opposition parties were given a brief period of airtime on the public Radio Television Malaysia (RTM) radio stations to broadcast their manifestoes. However, the government announced a change of policy in 1999, insisting that as RTM was government-owned, preference would be given to government parties.

== Election day ==
A voter confirms his identity before being given a ballot to vote during the 2026 Negeri Sembilan state election

On election day, registered voters may cast their ballot for their chosen candidate in a designated voting centre. These voting centres are typically schools or community centres which have been procured for that day. All activities in the school are suspended for that day. Holidays are also declared in states where election day does not fall on a weekend to allow maximum turnout.

Certain political parties will provide transport for voters to and from the voting centre. While campaigning is not allowed on election day, transportation is seen as something of a social service, especially since many people did not have a personal means of conveyance until the last decade or two, as of 2004.

No campaigning or advocacy for candidates is allowed within a voting centre. However, just outside the gate of most voting centres, there will be people plugging the various candidates.

=== Agents ===
Each candidate is allowed one agent per voting centre. Their job starts early and begins by inspecting that the metal ballot boxes have not been tampered. They also ensure that the boxes are securely locked before voting begins. After locking, the boxes are sealed by the election commission and each agent may place their own seal on the box.

The agents also ensure that the ballot papers given out to voters do not contain markings. In the past certain parties have marked the ballot papers for their own candidates. This will result in a spoilt vote which is discarded during counting. Some ballot papers have been coated with waxy surfaces to prevent voting for certain candidates. The agents ensure that these events do not occur.

The last task of the agent is to ensure that, on the close of voting, the ballot boxes are still secure and the seals are intact. This may be done at a designated counting centre instead of the voting centre. The boxes are opened once the agents are certain that there is no tampering.

=== Voting process ===
Since 15 December 2021, Malaysian citizens 18 years old and above are automatically registered to vote. Voting is not compulsory.

After identity verification at a voting centre, each voter receives two paper ballots, one for the parliamentary seat of the constituency and another for the state assembly seat. In federal territories, where there is no state assembly, and states whose state election is held on a different date, each voter receives only one ballot for the parliamentary seat.

Each voter walks into individual booth to mark ballots while maintaining confidentiality. The voter marks on each ballot the candidate of his or her choice with a cross beside the candidate's name and party symbol. After completing, the voter folds the ballots and drops them into separate ballot boxes for parliamentary and state assembly seats.

=== Counting and announcement of election results ===
After the close of voting the election agents check the ballot boxes prior to opening and counting. They also monitor the counting to ensure that the total ballots are the same as the number of votes cast. This extends to checking the number of "double votes". Every ballot paper has a serial number on it and they are given out sequentially. Agents may come to check that the serial numbers match up. The counting of the ballots is done by hand.

After a count at the voting centre the boxes are transported to the counting centre for a second count. If all candidates agree to the count then it stands or else an immediate re-count is done at the counting centre.

Election results are announced through live broadcasts by radio and television stations. Some newspapers print special editions to cover the election results. In most constituencies, the results will be out on the night of the election day. In some rural constituencies and constituencies that need recounts, the results may not be announced until the next day. In recent years, the younger voters have started staying updated with the polling results via social media and news apps.

== Election offences ==
There are a few offences under election law. Most of these pertain to acts which induce a voter to cast his ballot for a candidate. It is also an offence to use these actions to induce voters not to cast ballots at all. These offences extend to using third parties as agents to commit them.

- It is an offence to provide food, drinks or refreshments with a view to induce voters to either vote for a particular candidate or not vote at all.
- It is illegal to provide monetary rewards for voting for a certain candidate.
- It is an offence to threaten a person to vote for a candidate or not to vote. In 2004 this was extended to include "spiritual threats". This was due to the Pan-Malaysian Islamic Party (PAS) told citizens in less developed parts of the country not voting for the PAS is forbidden and that a vote for them would be rewarded by God.
- It is an offence to obstruct passage to and from a voting centre. Setting up a location for any candidate within 50 yards (50 m) of the voting centre is an offence. Similarly, loitering in this zone is also an offence. Only voters are allowed in this zone on voting day.
- It is technically an offence to provide transportation to a voting centre. However, this is not normally enforced as all parties do this to some degree. It is a further offence to use a vehicle that is normally rented out (such as a taxi or hired bus) to provide such transportation. The only exception to this is that it is allowed to provide for the crossing of rivers. No passengers of any vehicle can be forced to alight within 50 yards (46 m) of a candidate's booth on voting day.
- Each candidate is not allowed to spend more than RM 200,000 (parliamentary) or RM 100,000 (state) for campaigning under Section 19 of the Elections Offences Act, 1954.

== List of Federal General Elections in Malaya and Malaysia ==
| Number | Year | Government*** | | | Opposition | | | Total seats | Dissolution Date | Nomination Date | Polling Date |
| Number | Year | Seats | % seats | % vote | Seats | % seats | % vote | Total seats | Dissolution Date | Nomination Date | Polling Date |
|---|---|---|---|---|---|---|---|---|---|---|---|
Federal Legislative Council (Malaya)
| - | 1955 | 51 | 98.1 | 79.6 | 1 | 1.9 | 20.4 | 52 | 1 June 1955 | 15 June 1955 | 27 July 1955 |
Parliament of Malaya
| 1* | 1959 | 74 | 71.15 | 51.7 | 30 | 28.85 | 48.3 | 104 | 27 June 1959 | 15 July 1959 | 19 August 1959 |
Parliament of Malaysia
| 2 | 1964** | 89 | 55.97 | 58.5 | 70 | 44.02 | 41.4 | 159 | 2 March 1964 | 21 March 1969 | 25 April 1964 |
| 3 | 1969 | 95 | 65.97 | 49.3 | 49 | 34.03 | 50.7 | 144 | 20 March 1969 | 5 April 1969 | 10 May - 4 July 1969 |
| 4 | 1974 | 135 | 87.66 | 60.7 | 19 | 12.34 | 39.3 | 154 | 31 July 1974 | 8 August 1974 | 24 August - 14 September 1974 |
| 5 | 1978 | 130 | 84.42 | 57.2 | 24 | 15.58 | 42.8 | 154 | 12 June 1978 | 21 June 1978 | 8 - 22 July 1978 |
| 6 | 1982 | 132 | 85.71 | 60.5 | 22 | 14.29 | 39.5 | 154 | 29 March 1982 | 7 April 1982 | 22 - 26 April 1982 |
| 7 | 1986 | 148 | 83.62 | 55.8 | 29 | 16.38 | 41.5 | 177 | 19 July 1986 | 24 July 1986 | 2 & 3 August 1986 |
| 8 | 1990 | 127 | 70.55 | 53.4 | 53 | 29.45 | 46.6 | 180 | 4 October 1990 | 11 October 1990 | 20 & 21 October 1990 |
| 9 | 1995 | 162 | 84.38 | 65.2 | 30 | 15.62 | 34.8 | 192 | 6 April 1995 | 15 April 1995 | 24 & 25 April 1995 |
| 10 | 1999 | 148 | 76.68 | 56.5 | 45 | 23.32 | 43.5 | 193 | 10 November 1999 | 20 November 1999 | 29 November 1999 |
| 11 | 2004 | 198 | 90.41 | 63.9 | 21 | 9.59 | 36.1 | 219 | 4 March 2004 | 13 March 2004 | 21 March 2004 |
| 12 | 2008 | 140 | 63.06 | 50.27 | 82 | 36.94 | 46.75 | 222 | 13 February 2008 | 24 February 2008 | 8 March 2008 |
| 13 | 2013 | 133 | 59.91 | 46.53 | 89 | 40.09 | 53.47 | 222 | 3 April 2013 | 20 April 2013 | 5 May 2013 |
| 14 | 2018 | 125 | 56.31 | 49.86 | 97 | 43.69 | 50.14 | 222 | 7 April 2018 | 28 April 2018 | 9 May 2018 |
| 15 | 2022 | 148 | 66.7 | 59.0 | 74 | 33.3 | 41.0 | 222 | 10 October 2022 | 5 November 2022 | 19 November 2022 |

| * | The 1959 federal elections were the first parliamentary elections to be held after the independence of the Federation of Malaya |
| ** | Singapore, Sabah, and Sarawak federated with Malaya in 1963 but did not participate in the 1964 federal election under a transitory arrangement. Singapore left Malaysia in 1965. |
| *** | "Government" means Alliance Party in 1964; Alliance and Sarawak United People's Party in 1969; Barisan Nasional 1974 to 2013; Pakatan Harapan and WARISAN in 2018; Pakatan Harapan, Barisan Nasional, Gabungan Parti Sarawak, Gabungan Rakyat Sabah, and WARISAN in 2022. |
Source: Arah Aliran Malaysia: Penilaian Pilihan Raya (PDF)

== Latest election ==
=== Federal Parliament ===
| Party or alliance | | Votes | % | Seats | +/– |
|---|---|---|---|---|---|
| Pakatan Harapan | People's Justice Party | 2,477,741 | 15.87 | 31 | –16 |
| Pakatan Harapan | Democratic Action Party | 2,422,581 | 15.52 | 40 | –2 |
| Pakatan Harapan | National Trust Party | 884,391 | 5.66 | 8 | –3 |
| Pakatan Harapan | Malaysian United Democratic Alliance | 74,392 | 0.48 | 1 | New |
| Pakatan Harapan | United Progressive Kinabalu Organisation | 72,751 | 0.47 | 2 | +1 |
| Pakatan Harapan | Total | 5,931,856 | 37.99 | 82 | –19 |
| Perikatan Nasional | Pan-Malaysian Islamic Party | 2,378,811 | 15.24 | 43 | +25 |
| Perikatan Nasional | Malaysian United Indigenous Party | 2,064,201 | 13.22 | 31 | +17 |
| Perikatan Nasional | Parti Gerakan Rakyat Malaysia | 276,653 | 1.77 | 0 | 0 |
| Perikatan Nasional | Total | 4,719,665 | 30.23 | 74 | +43 |
| Barisan Nasional | United Malays National Organisation | 2,539,061 | 16.26 | 26 | –28 |
| Barisan Nasional | Malaysian Chinese Association | 684,104 | 4.38 | 2 | +1 |
| Barisan Nasional | Malaysian Indian Congress | 168,014 | 1.08 | 1 | –1 |
| Barisan Nasional | Parti Bersatu Rakyat Sabah | 23,877 | 0.15 | 1 | 0 |
| Barisan Nasional | Malaysian Indian Muslim Congress | 21,468 | 0.14 | 0 | 0 |
| Barisan Nasional | Malaysia Makkal Sakti Party | 10,660 | 0.07 | 0 | 0 |
| Barisan Nasional | All Malaysian Indian Progressive Front | 7,387 | 0.05 | 0 | 0 |
| Barisan Nasional | Love Malaysia Party | 5,417 | 0.03 | 0 | 0 |
| Barisan Nasional | Total | 3,459,988 | 22.16 | 30 | –28 |
| Gabungan Parti Sarawak | Parti Pesaka Bumiputera Bersatu | 343,954 | 2.20 | 14 | +1 |
| Gabungan Parti Sarawak | Sarawak United Peoples' Party | 167,063 | 1.07 | 2 | +1 |
| Gabungan Parti Sarawak | Progressive Democratic Party | 84,045 | 0.54 | 2 | 0 |
| Gabungan Parti Sarawak | Parti Rakyat Sarawak | 67,539 | 0.43 | 5 | +2 |
| Gabungan Parti Sarawak | Total | 662,601 | 4.24 | 23 | +4 |
| Heritage Party | | 281,611 | 1.80 | 3 | –5 |
| Gabungan Rakyat Sabah | Direct members of GRS | 94,413 | 0.60 | 4 | +4 |
| Gabungan Rakyat Sabah | United Sabah Party | 65,311 | 0.42 | 1 | 0 |
| Gabungan Rakyat Sabah | Homeland Solidarity Party | 29,874 | 0.19 | 1 | 0 |
| Gabungan Rakyat Sabah | Sabah Progressive Party | 5,054 | 0.03 | 0 | 0 |
| Gabungan Rakyat Sabah | Total | 194,652 | 1.25 | 6 | +4 |
| Gerakan Tanah Air | Homeland Fighter's Party | 79,594 | 0.51 | 0 | 0 |
| Gerakan Tanah Air | Parti Bumiputera Perkasa Malaysia | 16,360 | 0.10 | 0 | 0 |
| Gerakan Tanah Air | Pan-Malaysian Islamic Front | 11,386 | 0.07 | 0 | 0 |
| Gerakan Tanah Air | National Indian Muslim Alliance Party | 4,530 | 0.03 | 0 | 0 |
| Gerakan Tanah Air | Total | 111,870 | 0.72 | 0 | 0 |
| Sarawak United; People's Alliance | Parti Sarawak Bersatu | 57,579 | 0.37 | 0 | –1 |
| Sarawak United; People's Alliance | Parti Bansa Dayak Sarawak Baru | 3,053 | 0.02 | 0 | 0 |
| Sarawak United; People's Alliance | Parti Bumi Kenyalang | 2,311 | 0.01 | 0 | 0 |
| Sarawak United; People's Alliance | Total | 62,943 | 0.40 | 0 | –1 |
| Social Democratic Harmony Party | | 52,054 | 0.33 | 1 | New |
| Parti Bangsa Malaysia | | 16,437 | 0.11 | 1 | –5 |
| PSM–PRM informal coalition | Parti Rakyat Malaysia | 6,293 | 0.04 | 0 | 0 |
| PSM–PRM informal coalition | Socialist Party of Malaysia | 779 | 0.00 | 0 | 0 |
| PSM–PRM informal coalition | Total | 7,072 | 0.05 | 0 | 0 |
| Sarawak People's Awareness Party | | 1,036 | 0.01 | 0 | 0 |
| Sabah People's Unity Party | | 541 | 0.00 | 0 | 0 |
| People's First Party | | 264 | 0.00 | 0 | 0 |
| Independents | | 111,390 | 0.71 | 2 | –1 |
| Total | | 15,613,980 | 100.00 | 222 | 0 |
| Valid votes | | 15,613,980 | 98.71 | | |
| Invalid/blank votes | | 203,327 | 1.29 | | |
| Total votes | | 15,817,307 | 100.00 | | |
| Registered voters/turnout | | 21,173,638 | 74.70 | | |
Source: ElectionData.MY

=== State legislative assemblies ===
2025 Sabah State Election
| Party or alliance | | Votes | % | Seats | +/– |
|---|---|---|---|---|---|
| Sabah Heritage Party | | 288,703 | 25.57 | 25 | +11 |
| Gabungan Rakyat Sabah | Parti Gagasan Rakyat Sabah | 204,412 | 18.11 | 22 | -9 |
| Gabungan Rakyat Sabah | United Sabah Party | 55,909 | 4.95 | 7 | 0 |
| Gabungan Rakyat Sabah | United Sabah National Organisation (New) | 5,326 | 0.47 | 0 | 0 |
| Gabungan Rakyat Sabah | Love Sabah Party | 4,604 | 0.41 | 0 | 0 |
| Gabungan Rakyat Sabah | Sabah People's Hope Party | 2,063 | 0.18 | 0 | 0 |
| Gabungan Rakyat Sabah | Gabungan Rakyat Sabah Direct candidates | 14,075 | 1.25 | 0 | 0 |
| Gabungan Rakyat Sabah | Total | 286,389 | 25.37 | 29 | -9 |
| Barisan Nasional | United Malays National Organisation | 130,648 | 11.57 | 5 | -8 |
| Barisan Nasional | Sabah United People's Party | 10,184 | 0.90 | 1 | +1 |
| Barisan Nasional | Malaysian Chinese Association | 3,752 | 0.33 | 0 | 0 |
| Barisan Nasional | Total | 144,584 | 12.81 | 6 | -7 |
| Pakatan Harapan | People's Justice Party | 39,747 | 3.52 | 1 | -1 |
| Pakatan Harapan | Democratic Action Party | 34,786 | 3.08 | 0 | -4 |
| Pakatan Harapan | National Trust Party | 1,405 | 0.12 | 0 | 0 |
| Pakatan Harapan | Total | 75,938 | 6.73 | 1 | -5 |
| Homeland Solidarity Party | | 73,410 | 6.50 | 2 | -4 |
| United Progressive Kinabalu Organisation | | 64,471 | 5.71 | 3 | +2 |
| Social Democratic Harmony Party | | 54,050 | 4.79 | 1 | -1 |
| Perikatan Nasional | Malaysian United Indigenous Party | 24,978 | 2.21 | 0 | 0 |
| Perikatan Nasional | Malaysian Islamic Party | 15,214 | 1.35 | 1 | +1 |
| Perikatan Nasional | Parti Gerakan Rakyat Malaysia | 1,392 | 0.12 | 0 | 0 |
| Perikatan Nasional | Total | 41,584 | 3.68 | 1 | 1 |
| Parti Impian Sabah | | 13,265 | 1.17 | 0 | 0 |
| Sabah Progressive Party | | 7,733 | 0.68 | 0 | 0 |
| Sabah Native Co-operation Party | | 1,542 | 0.14 | 0 | 0 |
| Sabah Nationality Party | | 1,477 | 0.13 | 0 | 0 |
| Perjuangan Rakyat | | 1,414 | 0.13 | 0 | 0 |
| Parti Bumi Kenyalang | | 1,337 | 0.12 | 0 | 0 |
| Sabah People's Unity Party | | 1,124 | 0.10 | 0 | 0 |
| Parti Rumpun Sabah | | 898 | 0.08 | 0 | 0 |
| Sabah Peace Party | | 429 | 0.04 | 0 | 0 |
| Pertubuhan Gemilang Anak Sabah | | 293 | 0.03 | 0 | 0 |
| Parti Bangsa Malaysia | | 213 | 0.02 | 0 | 0 |
| Parti Aspirasi Rakyat Sarawak | | 141 | 0.01 | 0 | 0 |
| Malaysian United People's Party | | 131 | 0.01 | 0 | 0 |
| Sabah National People's Unity Organisation | | 73 | 0.01 | 0 | 0 |
| Independents | | 69,771 | 6.18 | 5 | +2 |
| Total | | 1,128,970 | 100.00 | 73 | – |
| Valid votes | | 1,128,970 | 98.30 | | |
| Invalid/blank votes | | 19,506 | 1.70 | | |
| Total votes | | 1,148,476 | 100.00 | | |
| Registered voters/turnout | | 1,784,843 | 64.35 | | |
Source: Election Commissioners of Malaysia

== Future elections ==
=== Dissolution of parliament ===
The 14th Parliament of Malaysia was dissolved on 10 October 2022. The 15th Malaysian general election (GE15) was held on 19 November 2022.

The Constitution of Malaysia stipulates that a parliament lasts for five years from the day of its first sitting unless dissolved earlier by the Yang di-Pertuan Agong due to a motion of no-confidence or at the request of the Prime Minister, and a general election must be held no more than 60 days following a dissolution. The first meeting of the first session of the 15th Parliament of Malaysia was held on 19 December 2022, which means the 15th Parliament (if not dissolved earlier) will automatically dissolve on 19 December 2027, and the next general election will be held by 17 February 2028.

The 222 members of the Dewan Rakyat are elected from single-member constituencies using the first-past-the-post voting system. Malaysia does not practice compulsory voting. On 16 July 2019, the Constitution (Amendment) Bill 2019 that requires a two-thirds majority of at least 148 votes from the 222-seat Dewan Rakyat to lower the voting age to 18 was passed with a total of 211 votes. The 2022 general election was the first to utilize automatic voter registration of all Malaysian citizens aged 18 and above.

The legitimacy of redelineation of electoral boundaries for the entire country are currently under review by the Election Commission (EC), which is under the jurisdiction of the Prime Minister's Department. The redelineation was approved 2 months before GE14, which saw enormous malapportionment between constituencies e.g. in Selangor, Sabak Bernam has 40,000 voters but in Bangi, there are 180,000 voters. Because Article 113 of the Federal Constitution stated that the EC could only conduct a redelineation exercise after eight years from the date of the last exercise or if there was a change in the number of parliamentary seats under Article 46. If the exercise is necessary for the next general election, amendments have to be made to the Federal Constitution and have to be passed with a two-thirds majority in Dewan Rakyat.

=== Dissolution of state legislative assemblies ===
Each state may dissolve its assembly independently of the Federal Parliament. In accordance with Malaysian law, the parliament as well as the legislative assemblies of each state (Dewan Undangan Negeri) would automatically dissolve on the fifth anniversary of the first sitting, and elections must be held within sixty days of the dissolution, unless dissolved prior to that date by their respective Heads of State on the advice of their Heads of Government.

Below are the dates of which the legislative assembly of each state would automatically dissolve:

| State (and Assembly) | Term start | Term end (on or before) | Next election day (on or before) |
|---|---|---|---|
| Malacca (15th) | 27 December 2021 | 23 September 2026 | 14 November 2026 |
| Sarawak (19th) | 14 February 2022 | 14 February 2027 | 15 April 2027 |
| Perak (15th) | 19 December 2022 | 19 December 2027 | 17 February 2028 |
| Perlis (15th) | 19 December 2022 | 19 December 2027 | 17 February 2028 |
| Pahang (15th) | 29 December 2022 | 29 December 2027 | 27 February 2028 |
| Penang (15th) | 29 August 2023 | 29 August 2028 | 28 October 2028 |
| Kelantan (15th) | 5 September 2023 | 5 September 2028 | 4 November 2028 |
| Selangor (15th) | 19 September 2023 | 19 September 2028 | 18 November 2028 |
| Terengganu (15th) | 24 September 2023 | 24 September 2028 | 23 November 2028 |
| Kedah (15th) | 25 September 2023 | 25 September 2028 | 24 November 2028 |
| Sabah (17th) | 11 December 2025 | 11 December 2030 | 9 February 2031 |
| Negeri Sembilan (16th) | 18 August 2026 | 18 August 2031 | 17 October 2031 |
| Johor (16th) | 27 August 2026 | 27 August 2031 | 26 October 2031 |

== See also ==
- Electoral calendar
- Electoral system
- List of the winning political parties in the Malaysian general election by parliamentary constituency
