= Solidarity Party =

Solidarity Party may refer to:

- American Solidarity Party, Christian democratic political party in the United States
- Homeland Solidarity Party, political party in Sabah, Malaysia
- Illinois Solidarity Party, American political party in the state of Illinois
- Indonesian Solidarity Party, political party in Indonesia
- Malaysian Solidarity Party, political party in Malaysia
- Solidarity Party (Egypt), Egyptian Islamist party
- Solidarity Party (Lebanon), Lebanese political party
- Solidarity Party (Panama), political party in Panama
- Solidarity (Scotland), former political party in Scotland that existed from 2006 to 2021
- Solidarity Party (Thailand), former Thai political party that existed from 1983 to 2002
- Solidarity Party of Afghanistan, political party in Afghanistan
- Solidarity Party (Armenia), political party in Armenia

== See also ==
- Solidarity (disambiguation)
