= M. G. Pandithan =

Malaysian politician (1940–2008)

Yang Berbahagia Tan Sri M. G. Pandithan PSM

Member of Parliament for Tapah
- In office 3 August 1986 – 20 October 1990
- Preceded by: Constituency created
- Succeeded by: Kumaran Karunagaran
- Majority: 5,985 (1986)

President of the All Malaysian Indian Progressive Front
- In office August 1990 – 30 April 2008
- Preceded by: Position established
- Succeeded by: P. Jayashree

Vice President of the Malaysian Indian Congress
- In office 12 October 1981 – 16 July 1988

Personal details
- Born: M. G. Pandithan; April 3, 1940 Kuala Lumpur, British Malaya (now Malaysia)
- Died: April 30, 2008 (aged 68) Kuala Lumpur General Hospital
- Party: MIC (1963-1988); IPF (1990-2008)
- Spouse: P. Jayashree

Tan Sri M. G. Pandithan (3 April 1940 – 30 April 2008) was a Malaysian politician and the founder president of the All Malaysian Indian Progressive Front (IPF).

The party claims to represent the Indian community in Malaysia and was a longtime rival of the Malaysian Indian Congress (MIC) until recently.

Pandithan was formerly an MIC vice-president, Member of Parliament for Tapah and parliamentary secretary to the Trade and Industry Ministry. He died in Kuala Lumpur General Hospital on 30 April 2008 at the age of 68, after suffering from a long bout of leukaemia.

== Background ==
Born on 3 April 1940, Pandithan was the eighth son of a Kuala Lumpur City Hall manual worker and a washerwoman. Pandithan grew up in the cramped government quarters at San Peng flats, an area notorious for crime.

He studied at SJK (T) San Peng and completed his Higher School Certificate at St Anthony's Institute before joining Tamil Nesan as a crime reporter.

== Political involvement ==
It took Pandithan many years to build a career in the Malaysian Indian Congress (MIC). He climbed the ranks of the party the hard way like Datuk Seri S. Samy Vellu, whom he had regarded as his mentor. But after winning a seat in the party's Central Working Committee his climb was rapid.

In 1981, he became party vice-president, commanding strong grassroots support from the MIC community. After being re-elected for a third term as vice-president in 1986, he won the Tapah parliamentary seat and was later appointed parliamentary secretary to the Trade and Industry Ministry.

However, he was issued a show cause letter on 2 June 1988, for alleging that the party leadership had failed to fight for the rights of the Malaysian Indian community and for allegedly practising caste-oriented politics. This was when bad blood between MIC president and Samy Vellu and Pandithan took the turn for the worse.

Two days later, he embarked on a "death fast" at the MIC headquarters' car park, bringing along a coffin and accompanied by 50 supporters, in a bid to prove his innocence and to get charges of inciting violence and unrest within the party dropped. He stopped the fast after 28 hours, following an assurance by then deputy president Datuk S. Subramaniam.

He was issued a second show-cause letter for bringing the coffin to the MIC headquarters and expelled from the party on 16 July 1988.

== President of Indian Progressive Front ==
After expulsion from the MIC, Pandithan tried to return to the party but was unsuccessful and in August 1990, he formed the All Malaysian Indian Progressive Front (IPF).

The new party supported the opposition coalition Gagasan Rakyat (GR) in the 21 October 1990, general elections. He contested and lost the Teluk Intan parliamentary seat under the ticket of Democratic Action Party (DAP).

However, he later had a change of heart and tried unsuccessfully to get IPF admitted into the Barisan Nasional (BN) in 1994 and the following year quit the opposition coalition to pledge support to BN. However, his attempt to join BN was blocked by Samy Vellu and MIC. Pandithan had to be content by lending outside support to BN.

In September 1995, then Prime Minister Datuk Seri Dr Mahathir Mohamad made Pandithan a senator in the Dewan Negara in recognition of the IPF's support and contributions to BN coalition.

== Enmity resolved ==
Pandithan and Samy Vellu, who were at one time best of friends, had been at loggerheads over more than two decades, often trading barbs through the media and trying to outdo each other through political manoeuvres.

Pandithan and Samy Vellu met for the first time in 12 years in June 2000, during the campaign for BN candidate S. Sothinathan in the Teluk Kemang by-election. Later, Samy Vellu publicly admitted that he had opposed IPF's entry into BN.

In October 2003, Pandithan openly called for Samy Vellu to hand over the MIC party leadership to his deputy, S. Subramaniam, saying that Samy Vellu had stayed too long.

However, when Pandithan fell ill and was hospitalised in 2006, Samy Vellu visited him and the two fell into an emotional reunion.

The IPF chief told a press conference in July 2007 that he wanted to bury the enmity with Samy Vellu but ruled out any merger plans with MIC, a BN component and the country's biggest Indian-based political party.

"Enough is enough. It has been more than 20 years, I don't want to have any enmity with him (Samy Vellu). Bad blood between the two of us is not good. I want to be a friend.

"We should join forces to fight for the Indian community. Twenty years of fighting is too long (between both leaders)," were Pandithan's words at the press conference.

=== IPF status ===
The sudden closeness of Samy Vellu and Pandithan caused many members of IPF to fear that the party would soon be dissolved and absorbed into the MIC. However Pandithan said he would never dissolve the party as long as "I am alive," said Pandithan in a press conference in July 2007.

“Even to the last drop of my blood, I want to remain in IPF. We have gone through 20 years of hardship and struggle and I want the party to remain," he said.

In his address at the party's 15th general assembly, Pandithan said that despite IPF's new co-operation with MIC, the struggle to be admitted into Barisan Nasional would continue.

== Election results ==
Parliament of Malaysia
Year	Constituency	Candidate	Votes	Pct	Opponent(s)	Votes	Pct	Ballots cast	Majority	Turnout
1986	P066 Tapah, Perak	M. G. Pandithan (MIC)	13,582	59.40%	Loh Jee Mee @ Jimmy (DAP)	7,597	33.22%	23,628	5,985	68.01%
1986	P066 Tapah, Perak	M. G. Pandithan (MIC)	13,582	59.40%	M Busra Anuwar (PAS)	1,688	7.38%	23,628	5,985	68.01%
1990	P070 Telok Intan, Perak	M. G. Pandithan (DAP)	15,499	46.81%	Ong Tin Kim @ Wong Thean Ching (Gerakan)	17,610	53.19%	34,096	2,111	68.56%

== Honour ==
=== Honour of Malaysia ===
- Malaysia
  - Commander of the Order of Loyalty to the Crown of Malaysia (PSM) – Tan Sri (2007)

== Death ==
Pandithan was admitted to the intensive care unit of Kuala Lumpur General Hospital in early 2008 due to leukaemia and died in the morning of 30 April 2008.
