= Solidarité =

Solidarité (French, 'solidarity') may refer to:

- "Solidarité" ("Solidarity"), a song, the subject of We Are One (film), 2020
- AS Solidarité, a Gabonese football club
- SolidaritéS, or Solidarity (Switzerland), a left-wing political party in the French-speaking part of Switzerland

== See also ==
- Solidarity (disambiguation)
- Solidarité Française ('French Solidarity'), a former French far-right league founded in 1933
- Solidarités international, a non-profit organization
