= 1995 Malaysian state elections =

State assembly elections were held in Malaysia on 25 April 1995 in all states except Sabah and Sarawak.

== Results ==
=== Perlis ===
Party or alliance		Votes	%	Seats	+/–
Barisan Nasional	United Malays National Organisation	49,342	64.54	13	+1
Barisan Nasional	Malaysian Chinese Association	2,721	3.56	2	0
Barisan Nasional	Total	52,063	68.10	15	+1
Angkatan Perpaduan Ummah	Pan-Malaysian Islamic Party	17,482	22.87	0	0
Angkatan Perpaduan Ummah	Semangat 46	6,902	9.03	0	New
Angkatan Perpaduan Ummah	Total	24,384	31.90	0	0
Total		76,447	100.00	15	+1
Valid votes		76,447	96.34		
Invalid/blank votes		2,904	3.66		
Total votes		79,351	100.00		
Registered voters/turnout		104,195	76.16		

=== Kedah ===
Party or alliance		Votes	%	Seats	+/–
Barisan Nasional	United Malays National Organisation	326,718	62.92	26	+4
Barisan Nasional	Malaysian Chinese Association	326,718	62.92	4	+2
Barisan Nasional	Malaysian Indian Congress	326,718	62.92	2	+1
Barisan Nasional	Parti Gerakan Rakyat Malaysia	326,718	62.92	2	+1
Barisan Nasional	Total	326,718	62.92	34	+8
Pan-Malaysian Islamic Party		163,412	31.47	2	+1
Semangat 46		14,918	2.87	0	0
Democratic Action Party		13,050	2.51	0	–1
United Sabah Party		1,043	0.20	0	New
Independents		95	0.02	0	0
Total		519,236	100.00	36	+8

=== Kelantan ===
Party or alliance		Seats	+/–
Pan-Malaysian Islamic Party		24	0
Semangat 46		12	–2
Barisan Nasional	United Malays National Organisation	6	+6
Barisan Nasional	Malaysian Chinese Association	1	+1
Barisan Nasional	Total	7	+7
Pan-Malaysian Islamic Front		0	–1
Malaysian People's Justice Front		0	New
Independents		0	0
Total		43	+4

=== Terengganu ===
Party or alliance		Seats	+/–
Barisan Nasional	United Malays National Organisation	24	+2
Barisan Nasional	Malaysian Chinese Association	1	+1
Barisan Nasional	Total	25	+3
Pan-Malaysian Islamic Party		7	–1
Semangat 46		0	–2
Independents		0	0
Total		32	0

=== Penang ===
Party or alliance		Votes	%	Seats	+/–
Barisan Nasional	United Malays National Organisation	310,302	65.80	12	0
Barisan Nasional	Parti Gerakan Rakyat Malaysia	310,302	65.80	10	+3
Barisan Nasional	Malaysian Chinese Association	310,302	65.80	9	+9
Barisan Nasional	Malaysian Indian Congress	310,302	65.80	1	+1
Barisan Nasional	Total	310,302	65.80	32	+13
Democratic Action Party		141,149	29.93	1	–13
Pan-Malaysian Islamic Party		12,512	2.65	0	0
Semangat 46		6,248	1.32	0	0
United Sabah Party		1,395	0.30	0	New
Total		471,606	100.00	33	0

=== Perak ===
Party or alliance		Votes	%	Seats	+/–
Barisan Nasional	United Malays National Organisation	500,202	69.38	30	+3
Barisan Nasional	Malaysian Chinese Association	500,202	69.38	13	+10
Barisan Nasional	Parti Gerakan Rakyat Malaysia	500,202	69.38	5	+4
Barisan Nasional	Malaysian Indian Congress	500,202	69.38	3	+1
Barisan Nasional	Total	500,202	69.38	51	+18
Democratic Action Party		113,872	15.79	1	–12
Pan-Malaysian Islamic Party		64,015	8.88	0	0
Semangat 46		39,798	5.52	0	0
Independents		3,093	0.43	0	0
Total		720,980	100.00	52	+6

=== Pahang ===
Party or alliance		Votes	%	Seats	+/–
Barisan Nasional	United Malays National Organisation	236,871	67.87	28	+3
Barisan Nasional	Malaysian Chinese Association	236,871	67.87	7	+3
Barisan Nasional	Parti Gerakan Rakyat Malaysia	236,871	67.87	1	0
Barisan Nasional	Malaysian Indian Congress	236,871	67.87	1	0
Barisan Nasional	Total	236,871	67.87	37	+6
Pan-Malaysian Islamic Party		47,164	13.51	0	0
Semangat 46		35,704	10.23	0	–1
Democratic Action Party		27,365	7.84	1	0
Independents		1,895	0.54	0	0
Total		348,999	100.00	38	+5

=== Selangor ===
Party or alliance		Votes	%	Seats	+/–
Barisan Nasional	United Malays National Organisation	514,159	73.84	30	+4
Barisan Nasional	Malaysian Chinese Association	514,159	73.84	11	+5
Barisan Nasional	Malaysian Indian Congress	514,159	73.84	3	0
Barisan Nasional	Parti Gerakan Rakyat Malaysia	514,159	73.84	1	+1
Barisan Nasional	Total	514,159	73.84	45	+10
Democratic Action Party		95,291	13.69	3	–3
Semangat 46		42,550	6.11	0	–1
Pan-Malaysian Islamic Party		41,618	5.98	0	0
Independents		2,654	0.38	0	0
Total		696,272	100.00	48	+6

=== Negeri Sembilan ===
Party or alliance		Votes	%	Seats	+/–
Barisan Nasional	United Malays National Organisation	194,833	72.52	20	+2
Barisan Nasional	Malaysian Chinese Association	194,833	72.52	7	+3
Barisan Nasional	Malaysian Indian Congress	194,833	72.52	2	0
Barisan Nasional	Parti Gerakan Rakyat Malaysia	194,833	72.52	1	+1
Barisan Nasional	Total	194,833	72.52	30	+6
Democratic Action Party		41,523	15.46	2	–2
Semangat 46		21,623	8.05	0	0
Pan-Malaysian Islamic Party		5,486	2.04	0	0
Independents		5,204	1.94	0	0
Total		268,669	100.00	32	+4

=== Malacca ===
Party or alliance		Votes	%	Seats	+/–
Barisan Nasional	United Malays National Organisation	147,811	69.38	16	+4
Barisan Nasional	Malaysian Chinese Association	147,811	69.38	5	+1
Barisan Nasional	Malaysian Indian Congress	147,811	69.38	1	0
Barisan Nasional	Total	147,811	69.38	22	+5
Democratic Action Party		36,850	17.30	3	0
Pan-Malaysian Islamic Party		23,004	10.80	0	0
Semangat 46		5,384	2.53	0	0
Total		213,049	100.00	25	+5

=== Johor ===
Party or alliance		Votes	%	Seats	+/–
Barisan Nasional	United Malays National Organisation	590,819	77.26	25	+4
Barisan Nasional	Malaysian Chinese Association	590,819	77.26	11	+3
Barisan Nasional	Malaysian Indian Congress	590,819	77.26	2	0
Barisan Nasional	Parti Gerakan Rakyat Malaysia	590,819	77.26	2	+1
Barisan Nasional	Total	590,819	77.26	40	+8
Semangat 46		69,929	9.14	0	–1
Democratic Action Party		65,523	8.57	0	–3
Pan-Malaysian Islamic Party		17,417	2.28	0	0
Parti Rakyat Malaysia		7,076	0.93	0	0
United Sabah Party		1,923	0.25	0	New
Independents		12,062	1.58	0	0
Total		764,749	100.00	40	+4
