= Parti Hizbul Muslimin Malaysia =

Political party in Malaysia

Muslim People's Party of Malaysia
- Malay name: Parti Hizbul Muslimin Malaysia ڤرتي حزب المسلمين مليسيا
- Chinese name: 馬來西亞穆斯林人民黨 马来西亚穆斯林人民党; Mǎláixīyà mùsīlín rénmín dǎng
- Abbreviation: HAMIM
- Founder: Asri Muda
- Founded: 24 March 1983
- Dissolved: 1998
- Split from: Pan-Malaysian Islamic Party (PAS)
- Succeeded by: Ikatan Masyarakat Islam Malaysia (IKATAN); Pan-Malaysian Islamic Party (PAS)
- Headquarters: Kota Bharu, Kelantan
- Religion: Sunni Islam
- National affiliation: Barisan Nasional (1983–89), Angkatan Perpaduan Ummah (1990–96), None (1996-98)
- Colours: Green, white

The Muslim People's Party of Malaysia (Malay: Parti Hizbul Muslimin Malaysia, Jawi: ڤرتي حزب المسلمين مليسيا; often known by its acronym: HAMIM) was a political party in Malaysia.

HAMIM was founded in 1983 by Asri Muda, the former President of the Pan-Malaysian Islamic Party (PAS) (1969-1982) and former Menteri Besar of Kelantan (1964-1973). Following the failure of PAS to win back the Kelantan state government in the 1982 general election, Asri faced the challenge to his PAS presidency by the cleric faction of the party, leading to his expulsion in 1982. Asri Muda had earlier declined from joining the United Malays National Organisation (UMNO) or Pan-Malaysian Islamic Front (BERJASA), to set up HAMIM as a new splinter party alternative to PAS while joining the ruling coalition Barisan Nasional (BN) after its foundation in 1983. In the 1986 general election, HAMIM as part of BN coalition had contested 2 parliamentary seats and 4 state seats which HAMIM had won 1 parliamentary (Bachok) and 2 state (Chetok and Meranti) seats in Kelantan. After Asri Muda's failed attempt to dissolve HAMIM in the party Extraordinary Muktamar on 17 November 1988, as the party president he had resigned together with other party representatives and eventually joined PAS's rivals, UMNO in 1988.

HAMIM was then led by the ex-Dungun MP, Abdul Wahab Yunus as the acting party president. But HAMIM again fell into leadership tussle and crisis in the party Annual General Muktamar in 1989. Abdul Wahab Yunus after his defeat decided to quit HAMIM and form a new party later; Ikatan Masyarakat Islam Malaysia (IKATAN) in 1990 which was taken-over and rebranded as the National Justice Party (Malay: Parti Keadilan Nasional) (KeADILan) in 1999 and subsequently as People's Justice Party (Malay: Parti Keadilan Rakyat) (PKR) in 2003.

The leadership of HAMIM was taken over by Sudin Wahab as party president. In 1989 just before the 1990 general election, the new party leadership decided to leave BN coalition. HAMIM had joined the opposition coalition of Angkatan Perpaduan Ummah (APU) consists of PAS, Parti Melayu Semangat 46 (S46), Pan-Malaysian Islamic Front (BERJASA) and Malaysian Indian Muslim Congress (KIMMA) in 1990. HAMIM contested Geting state seat in Kelantan under S46 ticket and managed to won in the 1990 general election but HAMIM failed to defend the seat in the 1995 general election. APU alliance was subsequently disbanded in 1996 after Tengku Razaleigh Hamzah decided to dissolve S46 and rejoin back UMNO.

HAMIM after failed to make much progress and success in any electoral achievement along with constant internal party bickering; has become inactive and dormant since.

== Government offices ==
=== State governments ===
- Kelantan (1986–1988, 1990–1995)

Note: bold as Menteri Besar/Chief Minister, italic as junior partner

== General election results ==
Election	Total seats won	Seats contested	Total votes	Share of votes	Outcome of election	Election leader
1986	1 / 177	2	29,943	0.63%	▲1 seat; Governing coalition (Barisan Nasional)	Asri Muda
1990	0 / 177	1	8,619	0.15%	▼0 seat; No representation in Parliament	Sudin Wahab

== State election results ==
State election	State Legislative Assembly		
State election	Kelantan	Selangor	Total won / Total contested
2/3 majority	2 / 3	2 / 3	2 / 3
1986	2 / 39		2 / 4
1990	1 / 39	0 / 42	1 / 2
1995	0 / 43	0 / 48	0 / 2

== See also ==
- Politics of Malaysia
- List of political parties in Malaysia
