= Members of the Dewan Rakyat, 8th Malaysian Parliament =

8th Parliament of Malaysia
←	7th Parliament	9th Parliament	→

Overview
- Legislative body: Parliament of Malaysia
- Jurisdiction: Malaysia
- Meeting place: Malaysian Houses of Parliament
- Term: 3 December 1990 – 6 April 1995
- Election: 1990 general election
- Government: Fourth Mahathir cabinet
- Website: www.parlimen.gov.my

Dewan Rakyat
- Members: 180
- Speaker: Mohamed Zahir Ismail
- Deputy Speaker: Ong Tee Keat; Juhar Mahiruddin
- Secretary: Wan Zahir Sheikh Abdul Rahman (until 1993); Abdul Rahman Ali
- Prime Minister: Mahathir Mohamad
- Leader of the Opposition: Lim Kit Siang
- Party control: Barisan Nasional

Sovereign
- Yang di-Pertuan Agong: Tuanku Azlan Shah (until 25 April 1994); Tuanku Jaafar

Sessions
- 1st: 3 December 1990 – 24 December 1991
- 2nd: 27 April 1992 – 24 December 1992
- 3rd: 26 April 1993 – 23 December 1993
- 4th: 11 April 1994 – 22 December 1994

This is a list of the members of the Dewan Rakyat (House of Representatives) of the 8th Parliament of Malaysia, elected in 1990.

== Composition ==
State	# of Seats	UMNO Seats	MCA Seats	MIC Seats	PAS Seats	Gerakan Seats	PPP Seats	DAP Seats	S46 Seats	PRM Seats	AKAR Seats	PBS Seats	USNO Seats	PBB Seats	PBDS Seats	SNAP Seats	SUPP Seats	PERMAS Seats	PLUS Seats	IND Seats
Perlis	2	2																		
Kedah	14	12	2																	
Kelantan	13				6				7											
Terengganu	8	6			1				1											
Penang	11	4				1		6												
Perak	23	11	3	2		3		4												
Pahang	10	7	3																	
Selangor	14	7	2	2				3												
Federal Territory of Kuala Lumpur	7	2				1		4												
Negeri Sembilan	7	4	2	1																
Malacca	5	3	1					1												
Johor	18	12	5	1																
Federal Territory of Labuan	1	1																		
Sabah	20											14	6							
Sarawak	27							2						10	4	3	4			4
Seats won	180	71	18	6	7	5	0	20	8	0	0	14	6	10	4	3	4	0	0	4
Seats contested	410	0	0	0	30	0	0	57	61	3	4	14	0	0	0	0	0	9	1	65

== Elected members by state ==
Shortcut:

Perlis | Kedah | Kelantan | Terengganu | Pulau Pinang | Perak | Pahang | Selangor | Kuala Lumpur | Negeri Sembilan | Melaka | Johor | Labuan | Sabah | Sarawak

Unless noted otherwise, the MPs served the entire term of the parliament (from 3 December 1990 until 6 April 1995).

=== Perlis ===
No.	Federal Constituency	Member	Party
BN 2
P001	Kangar	Ishak Arshad	BN (UMNO)
P002	Arau	Shahidan Kassim	BN (UMNO)

=== Kedah ===
No.	Federal Constituency	Member	Party
BN 14
P003	Jerlun-Langkawi	Sanusi Junid	BN (UMNO)
P004	Kubang Pasu	Mahathir Mohamad	BN (UMNO)
P005	Padang Terap	Affifudin Omar	BN (UMNO)
P006	Kota Setar	Wan Hanafiah Wan Mat Saman	BN (UMNO)
P007	Alor Setar	Chor Chee Heung	BN (MCA)
P008	Kuala Kedah	Mohammad Abu Bakar Rautin Ibrahim	BN (UMNO)
P009	Pendang	Othman Abdul	BN (UMNO)
P010	Jerai	Badruddin Amiruldin from 4 March 1992 (Note: Badruddin was elected to Parliament in the Jerai by-election, 1992 following the death of incumbent member, Ghazali Ahmad.)	BN (UMNO)
P010	Jerai	Ghazali Ahmad until 31 January 1992	BN (UMNO)
P011	Merbok	Abdul Daim Zainuddin	BN (UMNO)
P012	Sik	Abdul Hamid Othman	BN (UMNO)
P013	Baling	Raja Ariffin Raja Sulaiman	BN (UMNO)
P014	Sungai Petani	Che Ibrahim Mustafa	BN (UMNO)
P015	Padang Serai	Lim Lay Hoon	BN (MCA)
P016	Kulim-Bandar Baharu	Abdul Kadir Sheikh Fadzir	BN (UMNO)

=== Kelantan ===
No.	Federal Constituency	Member	Party
S46 6 | PAS 6 | BN 1
P017	Tumpat	Wan Mohd. Jamil Wan Mahmood	APU (PAS)
P018	Pengkalan Chepa	Nik Abdullah Arshad	APU (PAS)
P019	Kota Bharu	Ilani Isahak	APU (S46)
P020	Pasir Mas	Ibrahim Ali (Note: Ibrahim was elected to Parliament on the ticket of the S46 but left the party and rejoined UMNO in 1991.)	BN (UMNO)
P021	Rantau Panjang	Daeng Sanusi Daeng Mariok	APU (PAS)
P022	Nilam Puri	Mohamad Sabu	APU (PAS)
P023	Bachok	Buniyamin Yaakob	APU (PAS)
P024	Pasir Puteh	Wan Omar Wan Majid	APU (S46)
P025	Kok Lanas	Mohamad Shukri Mohamed	APU (S46)
P026	Tanah Merah	Ibrahim Pateh Mohammad	APU (S46)
P027	Machang	Ahmad Shukri Hassan	APU (S46)
P028	Kuala Krai	Ibrahim Mahmood	APU (PAS)
P029	Gua Musang	Tengku Razaleigh Hamzah	APU (S46)

=== Terengganu ===
No.	Federal Constituency	Member	Party
BN 6 | PAS 1 | S46 1
P030	Besut	Mohamed Yusof Mohamed Noor	BN (UMNO)
P031	Setiu	Tengku Mahmud Tengku Mansor	BN (UMNO)
P032	Kuala Nerus	Vacant from 29 March 1994 (Note: The seat were left vacant after Rashid's death and no by-elections were held as there is less than 2 years before the expiry of the parliament's current term.)	
P032	Kuala Nerus	Abdul Rashid Muhammad until 29 March 1994	BN (UMNO)
P033	Kuala Terengganu	Abdul Manan Othman	APU (S46)
P034	Marang	Abdul Hadi Awang	APU (PAS)
P035	Hulu Terengganu	Alias Md. Ali	BN (UMNO)
P036	Dungun	Awang Abdul Jabar	BN (UMNO)
P037	Kemaman	Ismail Said	BN (UMNO)

=== Penang ===
No.	Federal Constituency	Member	Party
DAP 6 | BN 5
P038	Kepala Batas	Abdullah Ahmad Badawi	BN (UMNO)
P039	Tasek Gelugor	Mohd Shariff Omar	BN (UMNO)
P040	Bagan	Lim Hock Seng	GR (DAP)
P041	Permatang Pauh	Anwar Ibrahim	BN (UMNO)
P042	Bukit Mertajam	Chian Heng Kai	GR (DAP)
P043	Nibong Tebal	Dominic Joseph Puthucheary	BN (Gerakan)
P044	Bukit Bendera	Gooi Hock Seng	GR (DAP)
P045	Tanjong	Lim Kit Siang	GR (DAP)
P046	Jelutong	Karpal Singh	GR (DAP)
P047	Bayan Baru	Ahmad Nor	GR (DAP)
P048	Balik Pulau	Mohamed Farid Ariffin	BN (UMNO)

=== Perak ===
No.	Federal Constituency	Member	Party
BN 19 | DAP 4
P049	Gerik	Tajol Rosli Mohd Ghazali	BN (UMNO)
P050	Larut	Mohd. Zihin Mohd. Hassan	BN (UMNO)
P051	Parit Buntar	Abdul Raman Suliman	BN (UMNO)
P052	Bagan Serai	Qamaruzaman Ismail	BN (UMNO)
P053	Bukit Gantang	Abdullah Fadzil Che Wan	BN (UMNO)
P054	Taiping	Kerk Choo Ting	BN (Gerakan)
P055	Tasek Chenderoh	Hamzah Mohamed Zain	BN (UMNO)
P056	Sungai Siput	Samy Vellu	BN (MIC)
P057	Tambun	Nawawi Mat Awin	BN (UMNO)
P058	Pasir Pinji	Kerk Kim Hock	GR (DAP)
P059	Ipoh	Lau Dak Kee	GR (DAP)
P060	Batu Gajah	Foo Piew Kok	GR (DAP)
P061	Kuala Kangsar	Rafidah Aziz	BN (UMNO)
P062	Beruas	Lim Keng Yaik	BN (Gerakan)
P063	Parit	Nasruddin Alang Saidin	BN (UMNO)
P064	Gopeng	Ting Chew Peh	BN (MCA)
P065	Kampar	James Wong Wing On	GR (DAP)
P066	Tapah	K. Kumaran	BN (MIC)
P067	Pasir Salak	Megat Junid Megat Ayub	BN (UMNO)
P068	Lumut	Ling Chooi Sieng	BN (MCA)
P069	Bagan Datok	Mohamed Jamrah	BN (UMNO)
P070	Telok Intan	Ong Tin Kim	BN (Gerakan)
P071	Tanjong Malim	Loke Yuen Yow	BN (MCA)

=== Pahang ===
No.	Federal Constituency	Member	Party
BN 10
P072	Lipis	Chan Kong Choy	BN (MCA)
P073	Raub	Teng Gaik Kwan	BN (MCA)
P074	Jerantut	Wan Abu Bakar Wan Mohamad	BN (UMNO)
P075	Kuantan	Fauzi Abdul Rahman	BN (UMNO)
P076	Pekan	Najib Razak	BN (UMNO)
P077	Maran	Muhammad Abdullah	BN (UMNO)
P078	Mentakab	Siti Zaharah Sulaiman	BN (UMNO)
P079	Bentong	Lim Ah Lek	BN (MCA)
P080	Temerloh	Sabbaruddin Chik	BN (UMNO)
P081	Rompin	Jamaluddin Jarjis	BN (UMNO)

=== Selangor ===
No.	Federal Constituency	Member	Party
BN 11 | DAP 3
P082	Sabak Bernam	Mahbud Hashim	BN (UMNO)
P083	Tanjong Karang	Saidin Adam	BN (UMNO)
P084	Hulu Selangor	Palanivel Govindasamy	BN (MIC)
P085	Kuala Selangor	Abu Hassan Omar	BN (UMNO)
P086	Kapar	M. Mahalingam	BN (MIC)
P087	Selayang	Zaleha Ismail	BN (UMNO)
P088	Ampang Jaya	Ong Tee Keat (Deputy Speaker)	BN (MCA)
P089	Hulu Langat	Lee Kim Sai	BN (MCA)
P090	Petaling Jaya	Kua Kia Soong	GR (DAP)
P091	Puchong	V. David	GR (DAP)
P092	Shah Alam	Rakibah Abdul Manap	BN (UMNO)
P093	Klang	Fong Kui Lun	GR (DAP)
P094	Kuala Langat	Basri Bajuri	BN (UMNO)
P095	Sepang	Mohd. Sharif Jajang	BN (UMNO)

=== Federal Territory of Kuala Lumpur ===
No.	Federal Constituency	Member	Party
DAP 4 | BN 3
P096	Kepong	Tan Seng Giaw	GR (DAP)
P097	Batu	Alexander Lee Yu Lung	BN (Gerakan)
P098	Titiwangsa	Suleiman Mohamed	BN (UMNO)
P099	Bukit Bintang	Wee Choo Keong	GR (DAP)
P100	Lembah Pantai	Mohamed Kamal Hussain	BN (UMNO)
P101	Seputeh	Liew Ah Kim	GR (DAP)
P102	Sungai Besi	Tan Kok Wai	GR (DAP)

=== Negeri Sembilan ===
No.	Federal Constituency	Member	Party
BN 7
P103	Jelebu	Ibrahim Sareh	BN (UMNO)
P104	Jempol	Mohd. Khalid Mohd. Yunus	BN (UMNO)
P105	Tampin	Mohd. Noh Rajab	BN (UMNO)
P106	Kuala Pilah	Napsiah Omar	BN (UMNO)
P107	Seremban	Yim Chee Chong	BN (MCA)
P108	Rasah	Wong See Wah	BN (MCA)
P109	Telok Kemang	T. Marimuthu	BN (MIC)

=== Malacca ===
No.	Federal Constituency	Member	Party
BN 4 | DAP 1
P110	Alor Gajah	Ibrahim Jendol	BN (UMNO)
P111	Selandar	Fong Chan Onn	BN (MCA)
P112	Batu Berendam	Mohd. Tamrin Abdul Ghafar	BN (UMNO)
P113	Kota Melaka	Lim Guan Eng	GR (DAP)
P114	Jasin	Abdul Ghafar Baba	BN (UMNO)

=== Johor ===
No.	Federal Constituency	Member	Party
BN 18
P115	Segamat	Subramaniam Sinniah	BN (MIC)
P116	Ledang	Abdul Ghani Othman	BN (UMNO)
P117	Pagoh	Ahmad Omar	BN (UMNO)
P118	Labis	Ling Liong Sik	BN (MCA)
P119	Mersing	Abdul Ajib Ahmad	BN (UMNO)
P120	Kluang	Kang Chow Oh	BN (MCA)
P121	Parit Sulong	Ruhanie Ahmad	BN (UMNO)
P122	Bakri	Chua Jui Meng	BN (MCA)
P123	Muar	Abdul Malek Munip	BN (UMNO)
P124	Sri Gading	Mohd. Yasin Kamari	BN (UMNO)
P125	Batu Pahat	Daud Taha	BN (UMNO)
P126	Sungai Benut	Abdul Hamid Abdul Rahman	BN (UMNO)
P127	Senai	Woon See Chin	BN (MCA)
P128	Kota Tinggi	Syed Hamid Albar	BN (UMNO)
P129	Tebrau	Siti Zainabon Abu Bakar	BN (UMNO)
P130	Johor Bahru	Mohamed Khaled Nordin	BN (UMNO)
P131	Pulai	Mohamed Rahmat	BN (UMNO)
P132	Pontian	Ong Ka Ting	BN (MCA)

=== Federal Territory of Labuan ===
No.	Federal Constituency	Member	Party
BN 1
P133	Labuan	Abdol Mulok Awang Damit	BN (UMNO)

=== Sabah ===
No.	Federal Constituency	Member	Party
PBS 14 | BN 6
P134	Marudu	Amir Kahar Mustapha	BN (UMNO)
P135	Bandau	George Sangkin	GR (PBS)
P136	Kota Belud	Maidom Pansai	GR (PBS)
P137	Tuaran	Monggoh Orow	GR (PBS)
P138	Kinabalu	Osman Minudin	GR (PBS)
P139	Jambongan	Metah Asang	GR (PBS)
P140	Sandakan	Lai Lun Tze	GR (PBS)
P141	Kinabatangan	Juhar Mahiruddin (Deputy Speaker)	BN (UMNO)
P142	Keningau	Joseph Pairin Kitingan	GR (PBS)
P143	Penampang	Bernard Giluk Dompok	GR (PBS)
P144	Gaya	Philip Yong Chiew Lip	GR (PBS)
P145	Tanjong Aru	Joseph Voon Shin Choi	GR (PBS)
P146	Papar	Osu Sukam	BN (UMNO)
P147	Kimanis	Nurnikman Abdullah	GR (PBS)
P148	Limbawang	Mustapha Harun	BN (UMNO)
P149	Padas	Raden Malleh	GR (PBS)
P150	Pensiangan	Taiman Lumaing	GR (PBS)
P151	Tawau	Geoffrey Yee Ling Fook	GR (PBS)
P152	Silam	Railey Jeffrey	BN (UMNO)
P153	Semporna	Vacant from 27 December 1994 (Note: The seat were left vacant after Sakaran's resignation and no by-elections were held as there is less than 2 years before the expiry of the parliament's current term.)	
P153	Semporna	Sakaran Dandai until 27 December 1994	BN (UMNO)

=== Sarawak ===
No.	Federal Constituency	Member	Party
BN 21 | DAP 2 | IND 4
P154	Mas Gading	Patau Rubis	BN (SNAP)
P155	Santubong	Rohani Abdul Karim	BN (PBB)
P156	Petra Jaya	Sulaiman Daud	BN (PBB)
P157	Bandar Kuching	Sim Kwang Yang	GR (DAP)
P158	Padawan	Yong Khoon Seng	BN (SUPP)
P159	Kota Samarahan	Abdul Taib Mahmud	BN (PBB)
P160	Serian	Richard Riot Jaem	IND
P161	Batang Sadong	Wahab Suhaili	BN (PBB)
P162	Batang Lupar	Wan Junaidi Tuanku Jaafar	BN (PBB)
P163	Sri Aman	Daniel Tajem Miri	BN (PBDS)
P164	Lubok Antu	Jawah Gerang	BN (PBDS)
P165	Betong	Douglas Uggah Embas	BN (PBB)
P166	Saratok	Peter Tinggom Kamarau	BN (SNAP)
P167	Kuala Rajang	Abang Abu Bakar Abang Mustapha	BN (PBB)
P168	Sarikei	Law Hieng Ding	BN (SUPP)
P169	Julau	Thomas Salang Siden	BN (PBDS)
P170	Kanowit	Leo Moggie Irok	BN (PBDS)
P171	Lanang	Jason Wong Sing Nang	GR (DAP)
P172	Sibu	Robert Lau Hoi Chew	BN (SUPP)
P173	Mukah	Leo Michael Toyad	BN (PBB)
P174	Selangau	Joseph Mauh Ikeh	IND
P175	Kapit	James Jimbun Pungga	BN (PBB)
P176	Hulu Rajang	Billy Abit Joo	IND
P177	Bintulu	James Wong Kim Min	BN (SNAP)
P178	Miri	Peter Chin Fah Kui	BN (SUPP)
P179	Baram	Harrison Ngau Laing	IND
P180	Bukit Mas	Michael Lisa Kaya	BN (PBB)
