= 1990 Malaysian state elections =

State assembly elections were held in Malaysia on 21 October 1990 in all states except Sabah (where they were held on 16 and 17 July) and Sarawak (where they were not held until the following year). The Barisan Nasional won ten out of the 11 elections. The Muslim Unity Movement won all 39 state seats in Kelantan to form the state government, with 24 seats going to the Pan-Malaysian Islamic Party and 15 for Semangat 46.

== Results ==
=== Perlis ===
Party or alliance		Votes	%	Seats	+/–
Barisan Nasional	United Malays National Organisation	40,315	55.31	12	0
Barisan Nasional	Malaysian Chinese Association	6,948	9.53	2	0
Barisan Nasional	Total	47,263	64.84	14	0
Angkatan Perpaduan Ummah	Pan-Malaysian Islamic Party	12,162	16.69	0	0
Angkatan Perpaduan Ummah	Semangat 46	11,528	15.82	0	New
Angkatan Perpaduan Ummah	Total	23,690	32.50	0	0
Independents		1,938	2.66	0	0
Total		72,891	100.00	14	0
Valid votes		72,891	95.44		
Invalid/blank votes		3,485	4.56		
Total votes		76,376	100.00		
Registered voters/turnout		99,097	77.07		

=== Kedah ===
Party or alliance		Seats	+/–
Barisan Nasional	United Malays National Organisation	22	+2
Barisan Nasional	Malaysian Chinese Association	3	0
Barisan Nasional	Malaysian Indian Congress	1	0
Barisan Nasional	Total	26	+2
Democratic Action Party		1	+1
Pan-Malaysian Islamic Party		1	–2
Semangat 46		0	New
Independents		0	0
Total		28	0

=== Kelantan ===
This election is the first time PAS had gained a majority since 1974. They would continue to rule the state uninterruptedly.

Party or alliance		Seats	+/–
Pan-Malaysian Islamic Party		24	+14
Semangat 46		14	New
Pan-Malaysian Islamic Front		1	+1
Barisan Nasional	United Malays National Organisation	0	–26
Barisan Nasional	Malaysian Chinese Association	0	–1
Barisan Nasional	Total	0	–27
Total		39	0

=== Terengganu ===
Party or alliance		Seats	+/–
Barisan Nasional	United Malays National Organisation	22	–7
Barisan Nasional	Malaysian Chinese Association	0	–1
Barisan Nasional	Total	22	–8
Pan-Malaysian Islamic Party		8	+6
Semangat 46		2	New
Total		32	0

=== Penang ===
Party or alliance		Seats	+/–
Barisan Nasional	United Malays National Organisation	12	0
Barisan Nasional	Parti Gerakan Rakyat Malaysia	7	–2
Barisan Nasional	Malaysian Chinese Association	0	–2
Barisan Nasional	Malaysian Indian Congress	0	0
Barisan Nasional	Total	19	–4
Democratic Action Party		14	+4
Pan-Malaysian Islamic Party		0	0
Total		33	0

=== Perak ===
Party or alliance		Seats	+/–
Barisan Nasional	United Malays National Organisation	27	+1
Barisan Nasional	Malaysian Chinese Association	3	0
Barisan Nasional	Malaysian Indian Congress	2	0
Barisan Nasional	Parti Gerakan Rakyat Malaysia	1	0
Barisan Nasional	People's Progressive Party	0	–1
Barisan Nasional	Total	33	0
Democratic Action Party		13	0
Pan-Malaysian Islamic Party		0	0
Total		46	0

=== Pahang ===
Party or alliance		Seats	+/–
Barisan Nasional	United Malays National Organisation	25	0
Barisan Nasional	Malaysian Chinese Association	4	–1
Barisan Nasional	Parti Gerakan Rakyat Malaysia	1	0
Barisan Nasional	Malaysian Indian Congress	1	0
Barisan Nasional	Total	31	–1
Democratic Action Party		1	0
Semangat 46		1	New
Pan-Malaysian Islamic Party		0	0
Total		33	0

=== Selangor ===
Party or alliance		Seats	+/–
Barisan Nasional	United Malays National Organisation	26	0
Barisan Nasional	Malaysian Chinese Association	6	–2
Barisan Nasional	Malaysian Indian Congress	3	0
Barisan Nasional	Parti Gerakan Rakyat Malaysia	0	0
Barisan Nasional	Total	35	–2
Democratic Action Party		6	+1
Semangat 46		1	New
Pan-Malaysian Islamic Party		0	0
Independents		0	0
Total		42	0

=== Negeri Sembilan ===
Party or alliance		Seats	+/–
Barisan Nasional	United Malays National Organisation	18	0
Barisan Nasional	Malaysian Chinese Association	4	0
Barisan Nasional	Malaysian Indian Congress	2	0
Barisan Nasional	Total	24	0
Democratic Action Party		4	0
Pan-Malaysian Islamic Party		0	0
Total		28	0

=== Malacca ===
Party or alliance		Seats	+/–
Barisan Nasional	United Malays National Organisation	12	0
Barisan Nasional	Malaysian Chinese Association	4	0
Barisan Nasional	Malaysian Indian Congress	1	0
Barisan Nasional	Total	17	0
Democratic Action Party		3	0
Pan-Malaysian Islamic Party		0	0
Total		20	0

=== Johor ===
Party or alliance		Seats	+/–
Barisan Nasional	United Malays National Organisation	21	–1
Barisan Nasional	Malaysian Chinese Association	8	–2
Barisan Nasional	Malaysian Indian Congress	2	0
Barisan Nasional	Parti Gerakan Rakyat Malaysia	1	0
Barisan Nasional	Total	32	–3
Democratic Action Party		3	+2
Semangat 46		1	New
Pan-Malaysian Islamic Party		0	0
Total		36	0

=== Sabah ===
Party	Votes	%	Seats	+/–
United Sabah Party	197,708	53.92	36	+2
United Sabah National Organisation	95,857	26.14	12	0
Sabah People's United Front	25,993	7.09	0	New
Liberal Democratic Party	14,323	3.91	0	New
Sabah People's Party	12,133	3.31	0	New
People's Justice Front	10,757	2.93	0	New
Democratic Action Party	5,879	1.60	0	0
Independents	4,006	1.09	0	0
Total	366,656	100.00	48	0
Valid votes	366,656	98.25		
Invalid/blank votes	6,528	1.75		
Total votes	373,184	100.00		
Registered voters/turnout	496,353	75.19		
Source: HLSC Tindak Malaysia Github
