= Malaysian Solidarity Party =

Malaysian Solidarity Party Parti Solidariti Malaysia MSP
- Abbreviation: MSP
- Founder: Yeoh Poh San
- Founded: 1986
- Headquarters: Kuala Lumpur
- Dewan Negara: 0 / 70
- Dewan Rakyat: 0 / 222
- State Legislative Assembly: 0 / 60

The Malaysian Solidarity Party or in Malay: Parti Solidariti Malaysia (MSP) was a political party based in Malaysia formed in 1986. It became defunct after the Malaysian general election, 1990 and the resignation of its Chairman, Yeoh Poh San and other Central Committee members. MSC was one of the seven coalition members of Gagasan Rakyat (GR).

== See also ==
- Politics of Malaysia
- List of political parties in Malaysia
