= All Malaysian Indian Progressive Front =

All Malaysia Indian Progressive Front
- Malay name: Barisan Kemajuan India Se-Malaysia
- Abbreviation: AMIPF or IPF
- President: Loganathan Thoraisamy
- Founder: M. G. Pandithan
- Founded: 1990
- Split from: Malaysian Indian Congress (MIC)
- Headquarters: 53, Jalan Sr 1/9, 43300 Seri Kembangan, Selangor
- Ideology: Dravidianism
- National affiliation: Gagasan Rakyat (1990-1996); Friends of BN (since 1996)
- Colours: Red, black, green
- Dewan Negara: 0 / 70
- Dewan Rakyat: 0 / 222
- Dewan Undangan Negeri: 0 / 607

Website
- www.ipfmy.com

The All Malaysia Indian Progressive Front (Malay: Barisan Kemajuan India Se-Malaysia), abbrev: AMIPF, or better known just as the Indian Progressive Front (IPF), is a Malaysian political party. It is a splinter party of the Malaysian Indian Congress (MIC) formed by its dissident leader M. G. Pandithan in 1990. The party was a component of the defunct opposition coalition, Gagasan Rakyat (GR) from 1990 to 1996, but it currently supports the Barisan Nasional (BN) coalition although it is not a component member. IPF had failed in its application to join BN after an objection from MIC. Instead it is being considered just as a 'Friends of BN' party. Prime Minister Mahathir Mohamad said the party has played a positive role in enhancing the image of Barisan Nasional, especially among the Indian community.

== General election results ==
| Election | Total seats won | Seats contested | Total votes | Voting Percentage | Outcome of election | Election leader |
|---|---|---|---|---|---|---|
| 2018 | 0 / 177 | 3 | 32,895 | 0.59 | No representation in Parliament (Gagasan Rakyat) | M. G. Pandithan |
| 2022 | 0 / 222 | 1 | 7,387 | 0.05 | No representation in Parliament (Friends of BN) | Loganathan Thoirasamy |

== State election results ==
| State assembly | Election | Votes | % | Seats | Won/contested | +/– | Position (Note: As part of electoral coalition.) | Status |
|---|---|---|---|---|---|---|---|---|
| Perlis | 2022 | Did not contest | | | | | | No seats |
| Kedah | 2023 | Did not contest | | | | | | No seats |
| Kelantan | 2023 | Did not contest | | | | | | No seats |
| Terengganu | 2023 | Did not contest | | | | | | No seats |
| Penang | 2023 | Did not contest | | | | | | No seats |
| Perak | 2022 | Did not contest | | | | | | No seats |
| Pahang | 2022 | Did not contest | | | | | | No seats |
| Selangor | 2023 | Did not contest | | | | | | No seats |
| Negeri Sembilan | 2026 | Did not contest | | | | | | No seats |
| Malacca | 2026 | Did not contest | | | | | | No seats |
| Johor | 2026 | Did not contest | | | | | | No seats |
| Sabah | 2025 | Did not contest | | | | | | No seats |
| Sarawak | 2021 | Did not contest | | | | | | No seats |

Note

| State election | State Legislative Assembly | | | | | | |
| State election | Kedah | Perak | Pahang | Selangor | Negeri Sembilan | Johor | Total won / Total contested |
|---|---|---|---|---|---|---|---|
| 2/3 majority | 2 / 3 | 2 / 3 | 2 / 3 | 2 / 3 | 2 / 3 | 2 / 3 | |
| 1990 | 0 / 28 | 0 / 46 | 0 / 33 | 0 / 42 | 0 / 28 | 0 / 36 | 0 / 8 |

== See also ==
- List of political parties in Malaysia
- Politics of Malaysia
