= Gagasan Rakyat =

People's Might Gagasan Rakyat
- Founded: 1990
- Legalized: 27 June 1992
- Dissolved: 1996
- Preceded by: Malayan Peoples' Socialist Front (SF) (1957-1969); Harakah Keadilan Rakyat (HAK) (1986-1990)
- Succeeded by: Barisan Alternatif (BA)
- Headquarters: Kuala Lumpur, Malaysia (DAP), (S46) & (KIMMA); Kota Kinabalu, Malaysia (PBS); Batu Caves, Malaysia (PRM); Seri Kembangan, Malaysia (IPF); Kota Bharu, Malaysia (HAMIM)
- Membership: Democratic Action Party; United Sabah Party; Malaysian People's Party; Indian Progressive Front; Malaysian Solidarity Party; Semangat 46; Muslim People's Party of Malaysia; Malaysian Indian Muslim Congress
- Ideology: Reformism

The Gagasan Rakyat (GR or People's Might) was an opposition Malaysian political coalition. The now defunct political coalition was founded by Tengku Razaleigh Hamzah's formation of Parti Melayu Semangat 46 (S46 or Semangat 46) after leaving United Malays National Organisation (UMNO) that was declared illegal. The coalition consisted Semangat 46, Democratic Action Party (DAP), United Sabah Party (PBS), Malaysian People's Party (PRM), Indian Progressive Front (IPF) and Malaysian Solidarity Party (MSP) as the coalition components. It were also joined by three other component members from its allied opposition Angkatan Perpaduan Ummah (APU) coalition also led by Razaleigh consisting of himself Razaleigh's Spirit of 46 Malay Party (S46), Pan-Malaysian Islamic Party (PAS), Pan-Malaysian Islamic Front (BERJASA), Muslim People's Party of Malaysia (HAMIM) and Malaysian Indian Muslim Congress (KIMMA). On 25 January 1995, DAP withdrew from the coalition while retaining its relations with Gagasan component parties.

Both the Gagasan Rakyat and Angkatan Perpaduan Ummah opposition coalitions under the leadership of Razaleigh were defeated in the 1990 and 1995 general elections, and were subsequently dissolved in 1996 after Razaleigh decided to disband Semangat 46 to rejoin the UMNO.

Not to be confused with Parti Gagasan Rakyat Sabah (also abbreviated Gagasan Rakyat), a different party that was established in 2013 with 20 other parties registered under Societies Act 1966 (Malaysia).

== Component parties ==
- Spirit of 46 Malay Party (Parti Melayu Semangat 46)
- Democratic Action Party (Parti Tindakan Demokratik)
- Parti Bersatu Sabah (United Sabah Party)
- Malaysian People's Party (Parti Rakyat Malaysia)
- Indian Progressive Front (Barisan Progresif India)
- Malaysian Solidarity Party (Parti Solidariti Malaysia)

Three others also allied members of the Angkatan Perpaduan Ummah at the same time.

- Muslim People's Party of Malaysia (Parti Hizbul Muslimin Malaysia)
- Malaysian Indian Muslim Congress (Kongres India Muslim Malaysia)

== Elected representatives ==
- Members of the Dewan Rakyat, 8th Malaysian Parliament
- Malaysian State Assembly Representatives (1990–95)
- Members of the Dewan Rakyat, 9th Malaysian Parliament
- Malaysian State Assembly Representatives (1995–99)

== Government offices ==
=== State governments ===
- Sabah (1990–1994)
- Kelantan (1990–1996)

Note: bold as Menteri Besar/Chief Minister, italic as junior partner

== General election results ==
Election	Total seats won	Total votes	Share of votes	Outcome of election	Election leader
1990	34 / 180	1,113,488	19.4%	▲2, Opposition coalition	Lim Kit Siang; Joseph Pairin Kitingan
1995	17 / 219	910,769	15.3%	▼17, Opposition coalition	Lim Kit Siang; Joseph Pairin Kitingan
Included only Democratic Action Party and United Sabah Party

== State election results ==
State election	State Legislative Assembly												
State election	Perlis State Legislative Assembly	Kedah State Legislative Assembly	Kelantan State Legislative Assembly	Terengganu State Legislative Assembly	Penang State Legislative Assembly	Perak State Legislative Assembly	Pahang State Legislative Assembly	Selangor State Legislative Assembly	Negeri Sembilan State Legislative Assembly	Malacca State Legislative Assembly	Johor State Legislative Assembly	Sabah State Legislative Assembly	Total won / Total contested
1990	0 / 14	1 / 28	0 / 39	0 / 32	14 / 33	13 / 46	1 / 33	6 / 42	4 / 28	3 / 20	3 / 36	36 / 48	
1994												25 / 48	
1995	0 / 15	0 / 36	0 / 43	0 / 32	1 / 33	1 / 52	1 / 38	3 / 48	2 / 32	3 / 25	0 / 40		
