= Malaysian Indian Muslim Congress =

Islamic political party in Malaysia

- Malay name: Kongres India Muslim Malaysia كوڠݢريس اينديا مسلم مليسيا
- Chinese name: 馬來西亞印裔穆斯林大會 马来西亚印裔穆斯林大会; Mǎláixīyà Yìnyì Mùsīlín Dàhuì
- Tamil name: மலேசிய இந்திய முஸ்லிம் காங்கிரஸ் Malēciya Intiya Muslim Kāṅkiras
- Abbreviation: KIMMA
- President: Datuk Seri Haji Syed Ibrahim Bin Kader
- Secretary-General: Hussein Bin Jamal Mahamad
- Spokesperson: Mohd Rapheal Bin Zakarudin
- Deputy President: Harrisrajudin Alaudin
- Vice President: Dato Anuar Sadad bin Hj Mohamed Mustafa
- Wanita Chief: Majunun Meher
- Puteri Chief: Rohaini Syed Ibrahim
- Founded: 24 October 1976
- Legalised: 1976
- Headquarters: 77-A, Tingkat 1, Medan Sri Bunus, Off Jln Masjid India, 50100 Kuala Lumpur
- Youth wing: Pergerakan Pemuda KIMMA
- Women's wing: Pergerakan Wanita KIMMA
- Women's youth wing: Pergerakan Puteri KIMMA
- Membership: 285,786
- Ideology: Malaysian Indian interests Islamism; Conservatism; Anti-communism
- Political position: Centre-right to right-wing
- Religion: Sunni Islam
- National affiliation: United Malays National Organisation (UMNO) (since 2010) (Note: Recognised as Friends of BN (since 2018)); Ikatan Prihatin Rakyat (since 2025) (Note: The party was member of the Angkatan Perpaduan Ummah (APU) (1990–96) and Gagasan Rakyat (GR) (1990–96))
- Colours: Green, white, red, yellow
- Dewan Negara: 0 / 70
- Dewan Rakyat: 0 / 222
- Dewan Undangan Negeri: 0 / 607

Website
- www.kimma.my

The Malaysian Indian Muslim Congress (Malay: Kongres India Muslim Malaysia; Tamil: மலேசிய இந்திய முஸ்லிம் காங்கிரஸ்; abbrev: KIMMA) is a political party in Malaysia which seeks to represent the interests of Muslim people of Indian descent in the country.

== History ==
Logos of Party

Old logo of KIMMA

Present logo of KIMMA

=== Formation ===
KIMMA was formed on 24 October 1976 to represent the interests of the minority Indian Muslim community in Malaysia, having split off from the Malaysian Indian Congress (MIC). The majority of KIMMA members are Indian Muslim. KIMMA was deregistered in 1978 and 1998 before it was successfully re-registered.

=== Crises ===
The party has managed to re-register back again by the Registrar of Societies (RoS) after its registration was cancelled twice in 1978 and 1998.

In 2008, KIMMA went through a leadership crisis when Amir Amsa Alla Pitchay, who had been dismissed by party president Syed Ibrahim B. Kader, claimed the presidency and suggested merging KIMMA with the People's Progressive Party (PPP), a Barisan Nasional (BN) component party.

The party faced another crisis in 2009 when the validity of its 33rd Annual General Meeting was put into doubt over allegations of misconduct and the dismissal of the party's Federal Territory deputy secretary-general, Mohd Fazil William Abdullah.

=== Parliamentary representation ===
Party president Syed Ibrahim Kader was appointed senator in the country's upper house, the Dewan Negara, for two three-year terms, holding that position from 2011 to 2017.

=== 2022 Malaysian general election ===
On 14 October 2022, four days after the dissolution of the 14th Parliament, party president Syed Ibrahim Kader revealed that BN leadership had agreed to nominate a candidate from the party to contest for a "safe" seat in the election, allowing them to make their election debut. He expressed his happiness that the party's loyalty to the coalition was recognised after 13 years as an UMNO associate member party and likened the seat as a "reward".

KIMMA pledged to carry on supporting and working with UMNO through its Jalinan Rakyat (JR) machinery in the 2022 Johor state election.

On 1 November 2022, BN Chairman and UMNO President Ahmad Zahid Hamidi announced that Syed Ibrahim Kader would contest the Puchong federal seat, which he would eventually lose to the Pakatan Harapan candidate.

== Political affiliation ==
KIMMA was a member of both Angkatan Perpaduan Ummah (APU) and Gagasan Rakyat (GR) opposition coalitions simultaneously from 1990 to 1996. The party had sought to join the then-ruling Barisan Nasional (BN) coalition since 1984 but faced opposition from the Malaysian Indian Congress. KIMMA continued to seek full membership in Barisan Nasional over the years before announcing it would no longer apply to do so in 2023 as a result of continued rejections. The party is considered a 'Friend of BN' and holds the status of associate member within the United Malays National Organisation (UMNO), granting it observer status in all UMNO division meetings and its annual general meeting (AGM).

== Leadership ==
- President
  - Datuk Seri Haji Syed Ibrahim Kader
- Deputy President
  - Tuan Harisirajudin Bin Alaudin
- Vice Presidents
  - Dato Haji Anuar Sadad Bin Haji Mohamed Mustafa
  - Tuan Hussein Bin Jamal Mahamad
  - Tuan Haji Mohamed Hussain Bin N. Mohd Sheriff
- Secretary-General
  - Tuan Omar Ali Bin Abdul Rahim
- Deputy Secretary General
  - Puan Anis Fathima Binti Abdul Jaafar
- Women Chief
  - Puan Rohani Binti Datuk Seri Syed Ibrahim
- Youth Chief
  - Tuan Rais Ahmad Bin Haji Mohamed Hussain
- Puteri Chief
  - Puan Mazvin Binti Jahabardeen
- Treasurer
  - Tuan Haji Jeyalaldeen Bin Kader Mohideen
- Chief Information
  - Tuan Muhammad Johan Jabez Bin John Millason

== General election results ==
| Election | Total seats won | Seats contested | Total votes | Voting Percentage | Outcome of election | Election leader |
|---|---|---|---|---|---|---|
| 1990 | 0 / 192 | 31 | TBD | TBD | TBD (Angkatan Perpaduan Ummah) | Syed Ibrahim Kader |
| 1995 | 0 / 192 | 31 | TBD | TBD | TBD (Angkatan Perpaduan Ummah) | Syed Ibrahim Kader |
| 2022 | 0 / 222 | 1 | 21,468 | 0.14% | No representation in Parliament (Friends of BN) | Syed Ibrahim Kader |

=== State elections ===
| State assembly | Election | Votes | % | Seats | Won/contested | +/– | Position (Note: As part of electoral coalition.) | Status |
|---|---|---|---|---|---|---|---|---|
| Perlis | 2022 | Did not contest | | | | | | No seats |
| Kedah | 2023 | Did not contest | | | | | | No seats |
| Kelantan | 2023 | Did not contest | | | | | | No seats |
| Terengganu | 2023 | Did not contest | | | | | | No seats |
| Penang | 2023 | Did not contest | | | | | | No seats |
| Perak | 2022 | Did not contest | | | | | | No seats |
| Pahang | 2022 | Did not contest | | | | | | No seats |
| Selangor | 2023 | Did not contest | | | | | | No seats |
| Negeri Sembilan | 2026 | Did not contest | | | | | | No seats |
| Malacca | 2026 | Did not contest | | | | | | No seats |
| Johor | 2026 | Did not contest | | | | | | No seats |
| Sabah | 2025 | Did not contest | | | | | | No seats |
| Sarawak | 2021 | Did not contest | | | | | | No seats |

== See also ==
- Politics of Malaysia
- List of political parties in Malaysia
- Parti Perikatan India Muslim Nasional (IMAN)
