= Angkatan Perpaduan Ummah =

Muslims Unity Force Angkatan Perpaduan Ummah
- Malay name: Angkatan Perpaduan Ummah
- Leader: Tengku Razaleigh Hamzah
- Founded: 1990
- Dissolved: 1996
- Preceded by: Malayan Peoples' Socialist Front (SF) (1957-1969); Harakah Keadilan Rakyat (HAK) (1986-1990)
- Succeeded by: Barisan Alternatif (BA)
- Headquarters: Kuala Lumpur, Malaysia (PAS), (S46)& (KIMMA); Pasir Mas, Malaysia (BERJASA); Kota Bharu, Malaysia (HAMIM)
- Membership (1998): Pan-Malaysian Islamic Party (PAS); Semangat 46 (S46); Pan-Malaysian Islamic Front (BERJASA); Muslim People's Party of Malaysia (HAMIM); Malaysian Indian Muslim Congress (KIMMA)
- Ideology: Islamism
- Political position: Right wing to Far-right
- International affiliation: -
- Colors: Yellow, green

Website

The Angkatan Perpaduan Ummah (APU or Muslims Unity Force) was an informal Malaysian political coalition. The now defunct political coalition was formed by Tengku Razaleigh Hamzah's formation of Parti Melayu Semangat 46 (S46 or Semangat 46) after leaving United Malays National Organisation (UMNO) that was declared illegal, jointly with Pan-Malaysian Islamic Party (PAS), Pan-Malaysian Islamic Front (BERJASA), Muslim People's Party of Malaysia (HAMIM) and Malaysian Indian Muslim Congress (KIMMA) before 9th Malaysian General Election in 1990. KIMMA left the coalition before the 10th Malaysian General Election.

APU along with the Gagasan Rakyat opposition coalitions led by Tengku Razaleigh Hamzah after failures in the 1990 and 1995 general elections. After the 1995 election, relationship between PAS and Semangat 46 detotriated due to lack of respect of PAS towards Semangat 46 and differing views on Kelantan state leadership. On 5 May 1996, Razaleigh announced the union no longer exist and were subsequently formally disbanded in October after Razaleigh decided to dissolve Semangat 46 to return and rejoin back UMNO.

== Component parties ==
- Pan-Malaysian Islamic Party (Parti Islam Se-Malaysia, PAS)
- Spirit of 46 Malay Party (Parti Melayu Semangat 46, S46)
- Pan-Malaysian Islamic Front (Barisan Jemaah Islamiah Se-Malaysia, BERJASA)
- Muslim People's Party of Malaysia (Parti Hizbul Muslimin Malaysia, HAMIM)
- Malaysian Indian Muslim Congress (Kongres India Muslim Malaysia, KIMMA)

== List of leaders ==
=== Chairmen ===
No.	Name (Birth–Death)	Portrait	Term of office		Time in office	Political party
1	Tengku Razaleigh Hamzah (b.1937)		1 February 1990	5 May 1996	5 years, 93 days	Semangat 46

== Elected representatives ==
- Members of the Dewan Rakyat, 8th Malaysian Parliament
- Malaysian State Assembly Representatives (1990–95)
- Members of the Dewan Rakyat, 9th Malaysian Parliament
- Malaysian State Assembly Representatives (1995–99)

== Government offices ==
=== State governments ===
- Kelantan (1990–1996)

Note: bold as Menteri Besar/Chief Minister, italic as junior partner

== General election results ==
Election	Total seats won	Seats contested	Total votes	Share of votes	Outcome of election	Election leader
1990	15 / 180	159	1,218,211	21.8%	▲14 seats; Opposition coalition	Fadzil Noor
1995	8 / 192	171	1,046,687	17.6%	▼7 seats; Opposition coalition	Tengku Razaleigh Hamzah

== State election results ==
State election	State Legislative Assembly											
State election	Perlis State Legislative Assembly	Kedah State Legislative Assembly	Kelantan State Legislative Assembly	Terengganu State Legislative Assembly	Penang State Legislative Assembly	Perak State Legislative Assembly	Pahang State Legislative Assembly	Selangor State Legislative Assembly	Negeri Sembilan State Legislative Assembly	Malacca State Legislative Assembly	Johor State Legislative Assembly	Total won / Total contested
1990	0 / 14	1 / 28	39 / 39	10 / 32	0 / 33	0 / 46	1 / 33	1 / 42	0 / 28	0 / 20	1 / 36	
1995	0 / 15	2 / 36	36 / 43	7 / 32	0 / 33	0 / 52	0 / 38	0 / 48	0 / 32	0 / 25	0 / 40	
