= Parti Melayu Semangat 46 =

Malaysian political party

Spirit of 46 Malay Party Parti Melayu Semangat 46
- Abbreviation: S46
- President: Tengku Razaleigh Hamzah
- Secretary-General: Suhaimi Kamaruddin
- Deputy President: Rais Yatim
- Youth Chief: Ibrahim Ali (1989-1991), Ahmad Shabery Cheek (after 1991)
- Wanita Chief: Rahmah Osman
- Founded: 3 June 1989
- Dissolved: 8 October 1996
- Split from: United Malays National Organisation (UMNO)
- Merged into: United Malays National Organisation (UMNO)
- Headquarters: Kuala Lumpur, Malaysia
- Youth wing: Pergerakan Pemuda S46
- Membership (1996): 200,000
- Ideology: Ketuanan Melayu; Malay nationalism Islamism; National conservatism
- Political position: Right-wing
- National affiliation: Angkatan Perpaduan Ummah (1990–1996); Gagasan Rakyat (1990–1996)
- Colours: Yellow and green

Party flag

The Parti Melayu Semangat 46 or Spirit of 46 Malay Party (S46) was a former Malaysian political party. The party was formed in 1988, and dissolved in 1996. It was formed by Tengku Razaleigh Hamzah's "Team B" faction of the United Malays National Organisation (UMNO), as a challenge to prime minister Mahathir Mohamad and UMNO.

== Establishment ==
The idea of Semangat 46 first came about in 1985 or 1986 when Malaysia was experiencing an economic recession. In 1987, Razaleigh's "Team B" faction challenged Mahathir's "Team A" faction for control of UMNO. Mahathir won the party election with a slim 41 votes majority in the controversial 1987 UMNO leadership election, and removed all Team B members from the cabinet. Team B leaders claimed many party delegates were improperly elected, and filed suit to overturn the election. This led to UMNO being declared illegal on technical grounds in 1988. Mahathir immediately reconstituted UMNO, with only Team A members.

Razaleigh and Team B formed their own party. They tried to register as "UMNO 46" (alluding to the party's founding in 1946. This was an attempt to invoke the nostalgic spirit of the old UMNO. "UMNO 46" was rejected as a duplicate name, so Razaleigh chose the name "Semangat 46". On 3 June 1989, Semangat 46 was officially registered with the electoral college. The first party's general meeting was held on 12 October 1989, officiated by Malaysia's first Prime Minister, Tunku Abdul Rahman Putra Al-Haj. Among notable leaders that joined Semangat 46 were Marina Yusoff, Ilyani Ishak, Rais Yatim, Harun Idris, Suhaimi Kamaruddin, Ahmad Shabery Cheek, Othman Saat, Salleh Abas, Mohd Radzi Sheikh Ahmad, Tengku Azlan Sultan Abu Bakar, and Ibrahim Ali.

== General election ==
In 1990, Semangat 46 formed two coalitions with other opposition parties to contest the 1990 Malaysian general election. The Gagasan Rakyat (GR) coalition was with the multi-racial Democratic Action Party (DAP) and Parti Rakyat Malaysia (PRM). The Angkatan Perpaduan Ummah (APU) coalition was with the Muslim parties Pan-Malaysian Islamic Party (PAS), Pan-Malaysian Islamic Front (BERJASA), Parti Hizbul Muslimin Malaysia (HAMIM) and the newly formed Malaysian Indian Muslim Congress (KIMMA).

Despite these alliances, Semangat 46 did poorly in the 1990 federal election, winning only 8 of 180 seats. However, the Angkatan alliance swept the state election in Razaleigh's home state, Kelantan, winning all 39 seats. Semangat 46 won 15, PAS won 24. For the first time in UMNO history, the party failed to win any seats in a state level.

Over the next few years, Semangat 46 lost support; many of its members defected to UMNO, including the party's youth chief Ibrahim Ali. After Ibrahim left S46, the youth chief was replaced by Zulkifli Othman, which was previously the S46 Youth Johor chairman. Others remained as members but withdrew from political activity. In February 1994, Semangat 46 decided to challenge UMNO on Malay communal issues. The party was renamed Parti Melayu Semangat 46, and thus renounced its multi-ethnic stance.

In the mid-1990s, Semangat 46's relationship with DAP deteriorated, which eventually led to the breakup of the Gagasan Rakyat (GR) coalition, shortly before the 1995 Malaysian general election. At the same time, Semangat 46 had increasingly strained ties with PAS over power-sharing in Kelantan state, though they still managed to retain control of Kelantan and worked together in the 1995 election. By this time, the party's credibility was severely compromised by winning so few electoral victories and the loss of many key figures. The deputy president, Rais Yatim, lost his parliamentary seat in the 1995 election, though Tengku Razaleigh was re-elected. In the end, Semangat 46 won six parliamentary seats, with support coming mainly from Kelantan.

== Dissolution ==
By May 1996, Semangat 46 was greatly reduced in size and influence. Razeleigh was finally worn out after spending millions of ringgit to upkeep the party. On 6 October 1997, an extraordinary general meeting were called and members voted for party dissolution. Razaleigh officially announced to the remaining 200,000 members that he would disband the party. Razaleigh rejoined UMNO with most of the party members. Some were denied re-admission to UMNO; they either left politics altogether or joined PAS.

== Government offices ==
=== State governments ===
- Kelantan (1990–1996)

Note: bold as Menteri Besar/Chief Minister, italic as junior partner

== General election results ==
Election	Total seats won	Seats contested	Total votes	Share of votes	Outcome of election	Election leader
1990	8 / 180	55	826,398	14.77%	▲8 seat; Opposition coalition (Angkatan Perpaduan Ummah)/(Gagasan Rakyat)	Tengku Razaleigh Hamzah
1995	6 / 192	67	616,589	10.35%	▼2 seat; Opposition coalition (Angkatan Perpaduan Ummah)/(Gagasan Rakyat)	Tengku Razaleigh Hamzah

== State election results ==
State election	State Legislative Assembly											
State election	Perlis	Kedah	Kelantan	Terengganu	Penang	Perak	Pahang	Selangor	Negeri Sembilan	Malacca	Johor	Total won / Total contested
2/3 majority	2 / 3	2 / 3	2 / 3	2 / 3	2 / 3	2 / 3	2 / 3	2 / 3	2 / 3	2 / 3	2 / 3	
1990	0 / 14	0 / 28	15 / 39	2 / 32	0 / 33	0 / 46	1 / 33	1 / 42	0 / 28	0 / 17	1 / 36	20 / 152
1995	0 / 15	0 / 36	12 / 43	0 / 32	0 / 33	0 / 52	0 / 38	0 / 48	0 / 32	0 / 25	0 / 40	12 / 130

== See also ==
- 1988 Malaysian constitutional crisis
- Gagasan Rakyat
- Angkatan Perpaduan Ummah

== Bibliography ==
- Francis Kok-Wah Loh; Francis Loh Kok Wah; Boo Teik Khoo; Khoo Boo Teik (2002). Democracy in Malaysia: Discourses and Practices. Routledge. p. 95. ISBN 0-7007-1161-9.
- Hwang, In-Won (2003). Personalized Politics: The Malaysian State Under Mahathir. Institute of Southeast Asian Studies. ISBN 981-230-185-2.
- Stewart, Ian (2003). The Mahathir Legacy: A Nation Divided, A Region at Risk. Allen & Unwin. ISBN 1-86508-977-X.
- Garry Rodan, Asia Research Centre (1996). Political Oppositions in Industrialising Asia. Routledge. ISBN 0-415-14865-0.
- Tan Seng Giaw (1989). First 60 Days: The 27th October ISA Arrests. Democratic Action Party. pp. 38–40.
- Yahaya Ismail (2003). UMNO POLITICS - Abdullah Badawi's DILEMA. Usaha Teguh Sdn Bhd]. ISBN 983-2236-03-7.
