= Solidarity (disambiguation) =

Solidarity is a unity of purpose or togetherness.

Solidarity may also refer to:

== Literature ==
- Solidarity (newspaper), a newspaper published by the Alliance for Workers Liberty in the United Kingdom
- Solidarity (U.S. newspaper), a newspaper published by the Industrial Workers of the World
- Solidarity, a monthly magazine published by the United Auto Workers

== Music ==
- Solidarity (Richard Clapton album) (1984)
- Solidarity (Joel Plaskett album), a 2017 album by Joel Plaskett and Bill Plaskett
- Solidarity, a 2012 album by The Souljazz Orchestra
- "Solidarity Song", a 1931 song by Bertolt Brecht and Hanns Eisler
- "Solidarity", a song by Angelic Upstarts
- "Solidarity", a song from Billy Elliot the Musical, written by Elton John and Lee Hall
- "Solidarity", a song by Black Uhuru
- "Solidarity", a song by Disrupt
- "Solidarity", a song by Enter Shikari
- "Solidarity", a song by Five Iron Frenzy from All the Hype That Money Can Buy
- "Solidarity," a song by Rancid

== Politics ==
=== Political parties ===
- Solidarity (Iceland), a political party in Iceland
- Solidarity (Ireland), a socialist party, formerly the Anti-Austerity Alliance
- Solidarity (Scotland), a breakaway from the Scottish Socialist Party in September 2006
- Solidarity (Switzerland), a political party in Switzerland
- Solidarity (Ukraine) or Bloc of Petro Poroshenko, a political party in Ukraine
- Solidarity Party (Illinois), an American political party founded by Adlai Stevenson III in Illinois

=== Other political organisations ===
- Solidarity (Australia), an Australian Trotskyist organisation
- Solidarity (UK), a libertarian socialist organisation in the United Kingdom 1960–1992
- Solidarity (U.S.), a United States political organization formed by the fusion of the International Socialists, Socialist Unity, and Workers' Power

== Trade unions ==
- Solidarity (Polish trade union)
- Solidarity (South African trade union)
- Solidarity (British trade union)

== Other uses ==
- Solidarity (Catholic theology), a Catholic Social Teaching and Christian virtue
- Solidarity economy, a wide range of economic activities that aim to prioritize social profitability instead of purely financial profits
- Solidarity Trophy, in rugby union, for the winner of the France–Ireland match in the Six Nations Championship

== See also ==
- American Solidarity Party, a Christian democratic political party in the United States
- Atassut, a political party in Greenland
- Cornish Solidarity, a cross-party organisation fighting for 'Cornish Rights'
- Indonesian Solidarity Party, a progressive and feminist political party in Indonesia
- La Solidaridad, a 19th-century Filipino propagandist group
- Solidaridad, Quintana Roo, Mexican municipality
- Solidariedade, a political party in Brazil
- Solidarism (disambiguation)
- Operation Solidarity, a protest movement in Vancouver, British Columbia in 1983
- "Solidarity Forever", an anthem of the leftist and trade-union movements
- Solidarity - Kosovo is Serbia, a Serbian media campaign
- Solidarity Movement with Chile, a political movement in Chile, 1972–1990
- Solidarity Youth Movement, a youth movement based in Kerala, India
- Solidarnost, a modern Russian opposition movement
