= 1995 Malaysian general election =

- 24–25 April 1995

All 192 seats in the Dewan Rakyat 97 seats needed for a majority
- Registered: 9,012,370
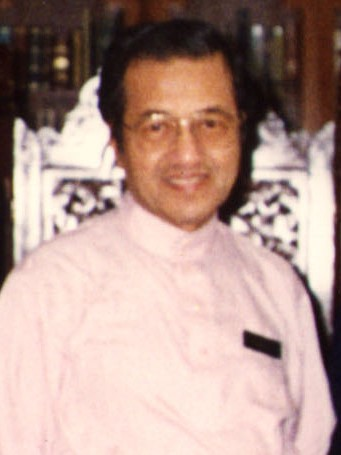

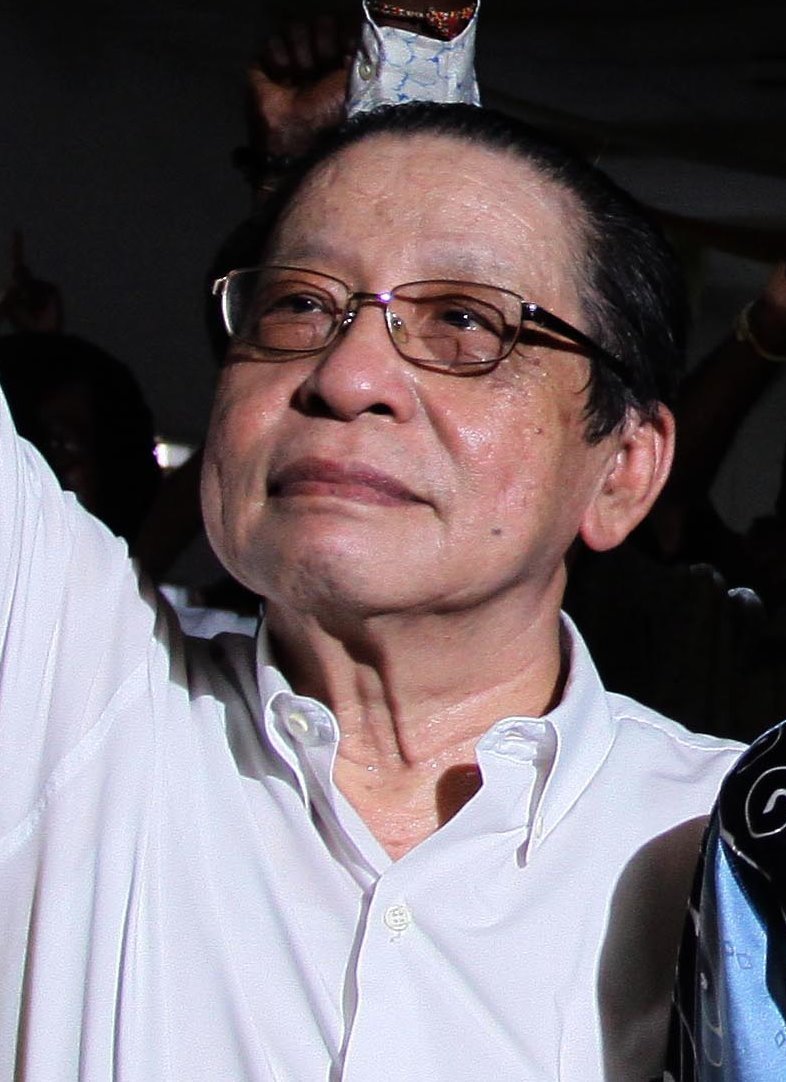
Leader	Mahathir Mohamad	Tengku Razaleigh Hamzah; Fadzil Noor	Lim Kit Siang; Joseph Pairin Kitingan
Alliance	BN	APU	GR
Last election	53.38%, 127 seats	21.78%, 15 seats	19.91%, 34 seats
Seats won	162	13	17
Seat change	▲35	▼2	▼17
Popular vote	3,881,214	1,046,687	910,769
Percentage	65.16%	17.57%	15.29%
Swing	▲11.78pp	▼4.21pp	▼4.62pp
Prime Minister before election
Mahathir Mohamad
BN
Prime Minister-designate
Mahathir Mohamad
BN

General elections were held in Malaysia on 24 and 25 April 1995. Voting took place in all 192 parliamentary constituencies of Malaysia, each electing one Member of Parliament to the Dewan Rakyat, the dominant house of Parliament. State elections also took place in 394 state constituencies in 11 out of 13 states of Malaysia (except Sabah and Sarawak) on the same day.

The result was a victory for the UMNO-led Barisan Nasional, which won 162 of the 192 seats. Voter turnout was 68%.

== Results ==
Party or alliance		Votes	%	Seats	+/–
Barisan Nasional	United Malays National Organisation	3,881,214	65.16	89	+18
Barisan Nasional	Malaysian Chinese Association	3,881,214	65.16	30	+12
Barisan Nasional	Parti Pesaka Bumiputera Bersatu	3,881,214	65.16	10	0
Barisan Nasional	Sarawak United Peoples' Party	3,881,214	65.16	7	+3
Barisan Nasional	Malaysian Indian Congress	3,881,214	65.16	7	+1
Barisan Nasional	Parti Gerakan Rakyat Malaysia	3,881,214	65.16	7	+2
Barisan Nasional	Parti Bansa Dayak Sarawak	3,881,214	65.16	5	+1
Barisan Nasional	Sarawak National Party	3,881,214	65.16	3	0
Barisan Nasional	Sabah Progressive Party	3,881,214	65.16	2	New
Barisan Nasional	Liberal Democratic Party	3,881,214	65.16	1	New
Barisan Nasional	Sabah Democratic Party	3,881,214	65.16	0	New
Barisan Nasional	People's Progressive Party	3,881,214	65.16	0	0
Barisan Nasional	People's Justice Front	3,881,214	65.16	0	0
Barisan Nasional	Parti Bersatu Rakyat Sabah	3,881,214	65.16	0	New
Barisan Nasional	Independent	3,881,214	65.16	1	New
Barisan Nasional	Total	3,881,214	65.16	162	+35
Angkatan; Perpaduan Ummah	Parti Melayu Semangat 46	616,589	10.35	6	–2
Angkatan; Perpaduan Ummah	Pan-Malaysian Islamic Party	430,098	7.22	7	0
Angkatan; Perpaduan Ummah	Total	1,046,687	17.57	13	–2
Gagasan Rakyat	Democratic Action Party	712,175	11.96	9	–11
Gagasan Rakyat	United Sabah Party	198,594	3.33	8	–6
Gagasan Rakyat	Total	910,769	15.29	17	–17
Malaysian People's Justice Front		4,957	0.08	0	New
Parti Rakyat Malaysia		113,068	1.90	0	0
Independents		113,068	1.90	0	–4
Total		5,956,695	100.00	192	+12
Valid votes		5,956,695	96.81		
Invalid/blank votes		196,114	3.19		
Total votes		6,152,809	100.00		
Registered voters/turnout		9,012,370	68.27		
Source: Nohlen et al., IPU

=== Results by state ===
==== Johor ====
Party or alliance		Votes	%	Seats	+/–
Barisan Nasional	United Malays National Organisation	613,992	79.44	13	+1
Barisan Nasional	Malaysian Chinese Association	613,992	79.44	6	+1
Barisan Nasional	Malaysian Indian Congress	613,992	79.44	1	0
Barisan Nasional	Total	613,992	79.44	20	+2
Semangat 46		69,519	9.00	0	0
Democratic Action Party		53,663	6.94	0	0
Pan-Malaysian Islamic Party		19,536	2.53	0	0
Parti Rakyat Malaysia		11,240	1.45	0	0
United Sabah Party		4,165	0.54	0	New
Independents		741	0.10	0	0
Total		772,856	100.00	20	+2
Valid votes		772,856	95.58		
Invalid/blank votes		35,775	4.42		
Total votes		808,631	100.00		
Registered voters/turnout		1,108,335	72.96		

==== Kedah ====
Party or alliance		Votes	%	Seats	+/–
Barisan Nasional	United Malays National Organisation	274,328	53.49	13	+1
Barisan Nasional	Malaysian Chinese Association	56,787	11.07	2	0
Barisan Nasional	Total	331,115	64.56	15	+1
Pan-Malaysian Islamic Party		127,671	24.89	0	0
Parti Melayu Semangat 46		52,895	10.31	0	0
Independents		1,177	0.23	0	0
Total		512,858	100.00	15	+1
Valid votes		512,858	95.69		
Invalid/blank votes		23,100	4.31		
Total votes		535,958	100.00		

==== Kelantan ====
Party or alliance		Votes	%	Seats	+/–
Barisan Nasional	United Malays National Organisation	185,845	42.18	2	+2
Parti Melayu Semangat 46		137,551	31.22	6	-1
Pan-Malaysian Islamic Party		112,022	25.42	6	0
Malaysian People's Justice Front		4,957	1.12	0	0
Independents		273	0.06	0	0
Total		440,648	100.00	14	1
Valid votes		440,648	95.00		
Invalid/blank votes		23,192	5.00		
Total votes		463,840	100.00		

==== Kuala Lumpur ====
Party	Seats	+/–
Barisan Nasional	6	+3
Democratic Action Party	4	0
Parti Melayu Semangat 46	0	0
Parti Rakyat Malaysia	0	0
Pan-Malaysian Islamic Party	0	New
Independents	0	0
Total	10	+3

==== Labuan ====
Party	Votes	%	Seats	+/–
Barisan Nasional	9,076	69.79	1	0
United Sabah Party	3,929	30.21	0	New
Total	13,005	100.00	1	0
Valid votes	13,005	97.36		
Invalid/blank votes	353	2.64		
Total votes	13,358	100.00		
Registered voters/turnout	20,243	65.99		

==== Malacca ====
Party or alliance		Votes	%	Seats	+/–
Barisan Nasional	United Malays National Organisation	146,240	67.77	3	0
Barisan Nasional	Malaysian Chinese Association	146,240	67.77	1	0
Barisan Nasional	Total	146,240	67.77	4	0
Democratic Action Party		45,318	21.00	1	0
Pan-Malaysian Islamic Party		16,747	7.76	0	0
Parti Melayu Semangat 46		7,496	3.47	0	0
Total		215,801	100.00	5	0

==== Negeri Sembilan ====
Party or alliance		Votes	%	Seats	+/–
Barisan Nasional	United Malays National Organisation	186,856	70.03	4	0
Barisan Nasional	Malaysian Chinese Association	186,856	70.03	2	0
Barisan Nasional	Malaysian Indian Congress	186,856	70.03	1	0
Barisan Nasional	Total	186,856	70.03	7	0
Democratic Action Party		47,520	17.81	0	0
Parti Melayu Semangat 46		24,544	9.20	0	0
Pan-Malaysian Islamic Party		6,229	2.33	0	0
Independents		1,672	0.63	0	0
Total		266,821	100.00	7	0
Valid votes		266,821	96.14		
Invalid/blank votes		10,706	3.86		
Total votes		277,527	100.00		
Registered voters/turnout		381,388	72.77		

==== Pahang ====
Party or alliance		Votes	%	Seats	+/–
Barisan Nasional	United Malays National Organisation	244,574	70.88	8	+1
Barisan Nasional	Malaysian Chinese Association	244,574	70.88	3	0
Barisan Nasional	Total	244,574	70.88	11	+1
Parti Melayu Semangat 46		56,424	16.35	0	0
Pan-Malaysian Islamic Party		24,650	7.14	0	0
Democratic Action Party		15,074	4.37	0	-4
Independents		4,333	1.26	0	0
Total		345,055	100.00	11	+1
Valid votes		345,055	95.68		
Invalid/blank votes		15,594	4.32		
Total votes		360,649	100.00		
Registered voters/turnout		498,329	72.37		

==== Penang ====
Party or alliance		Votes	%	Seats	+/–
Barisan Nasional	United Malays National Organisation	107,241	22.80	4	0
Barisan Nasional	Parti Gerakan Rakyat Malaysia	89,752	19.08	2	+1
Barisan Nasional	Malaysian Chinese Association	88,771	18.87	2	+2
Barisan Nasional	Total	285,764	60.76	8	+3
Democratic Action Party		159,865	33.99	3	-3
Pan-Malaysian Islamic Party		11,481	2.44	0	0
Parti Melayu Semangat 46		11,355	2.41	0	0
United Sabah Party		1,873	0.40	0	0
Total		470,338	100.00	11	0
Valid votes		470,338	97.24		
Invalid/blank votes		13,366	2.76		
Total votes		483,704	100.00		
Registered voters/turnout		634,713	76.21		

==== Perak ====
Party or alliance		Votes	%	Seats	+/–
Barisan Nasional	United Malays National Organisation	471,126	69.09	11	0
Barisan Nasional	Malaysian Chinese Association	471,126	69.09	7	+4
Barisan Nasional	Parti Gerakan Rakyat Malaysia	471,126	69.09	3	0
Barisan Nasional	Malaysian Indian Congress	471,126	69.09	2	0
Barisan Nasional	Total	471,126	69.09	23	+4
Democratic Action Party		127,500	18.70	0	-4
Parti Melayu Semangat 46		62,486	9.16	0	0
Pan-Malaysian Islamic Party		19,119	2.80	0	0
Independents		1,657	0.24	0	0
Total		681,888	100.00	23	0

==== Perlis ====
Party or alliance		Votes	%	Seats	+/–
Barisan Nasional	United Malays National Organisation	53,279	62.27	3	+1
Pan-Malaysian Islamic Party		22,943	26.82	0	0
Parti Melayu Semangat 46		9,337	10.91	0	0
Total		85,559	100.00	3	+1
Valid votes		85,559	96.59		
Invalid/blank votes		3,019	3.41		
Total votes		88,578	100.00		

==== Sabah ====
Party or alliance		Votes	%	Seats	+/–
Barisan Nasional	United Malays National Organisation	228,195	52.95	9	New
Barisan Nasional	Sabah Progressive Party	228,195	52.95	2	New
Barisan Nasional	Liberal Democratic Party	228,195	52.95	1	New
Barisan Nasional	Total	228,195	52.95	12	0
United Sabah Party		183,891	42.67	8	-6
Democratic Action Party		16,902	3.92	0	-4
Independents		1,995	0.46	0	-4
Total		430,983	100.00	20	0

==== Sarawak ====
Party or alliance		Votes	%	Seats	+/–
Barisan Nasional	Sarawak United Peoples' Party	116,403	30.92	7	+3
Barisan Nasional	Sarawak National Party	44,185	11.74	3	0
Barisan Nasional	Parti Pesaka Bumiputera Bersatu	42,210	11.21	10	0
Barisan Nasional	Parti Bansa Dayak Sarawak	29,768	7.91	5	+1
Barisan Nasional	Independent	6,731	1.79	1	+1
Barisan Nasional	Total	239,297	63.56	26	+5
Democratic Action Party		78,456	20.84	1	-1
United Sabah Party		5,536	1.47	0	New
Independents		53,180	14.13	0	-4
Total		376,469	100.00	27	0
Valid votes		376,469	98.10		
Invalid/blank votes		7,283	1.90		
Total votes		383,752	100.00		
Registered voters/turnout		595,713	64.42		

==== Selangor ====
Party or alliance		Seats	+/–
Barisan Nasional	United Malays National Organisation	8	+1
Barisan Nasional	Malaysian Chinese Association	6	+4
Barisan Nasional	Malaysian Indian Congress	3	+1
Barisan Nasional	Total	17	+6
Parti Melayu Semangat 46		0	0
Democratic Action Party		0	-3
Parti Rakyat Malaysia		0	0
Pan-Malaysian Islamic Party		0	0
Independents		0	0
Total		17	3

==== Terengganu ====
Party or alliance		Votes	%	Seats	+/–
Barisan Nasional	United Malays National Organisation	157,020	54.71	7	+1
Parti Melayu Semangat 46		65,311	22.76	0	0
Pan-Malaysian Islamic Party		64,657	22.53	1	0
Total		286,988	100.00	8	0
Valid votes		286,988	96.40		
Invalid/blank votes		10,727	3.60		
Total votes		297,715	100.00		
Registered voters/turnout		367,696	80.97		

== Aftermath ==
The 1995 general elections were the second and last elections involving Semangat 46. Having lost around a third of its vote share and facing desertions from party members, its leader Tengku Razaleigh Hamzah disbanded the party in 1996 and rejoined UMNO along with some other former Semangat 46 members.

== See also ==
- 1995 Malaysian state elections
