= 1990 Malaysian general election =

- 20–21 October 1990

All 180 seats in the Dewan Rakyat 91 seats needed for a majority
- Registered: 7,958,640
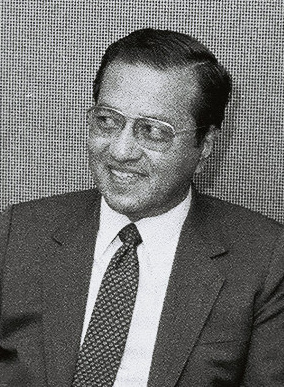

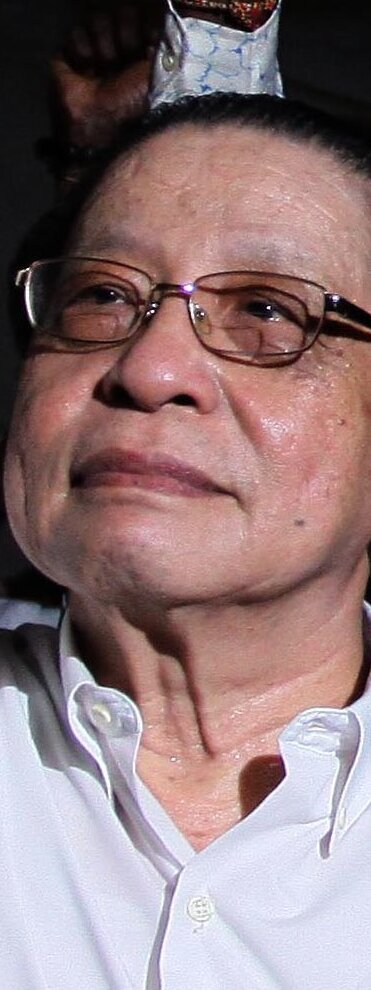

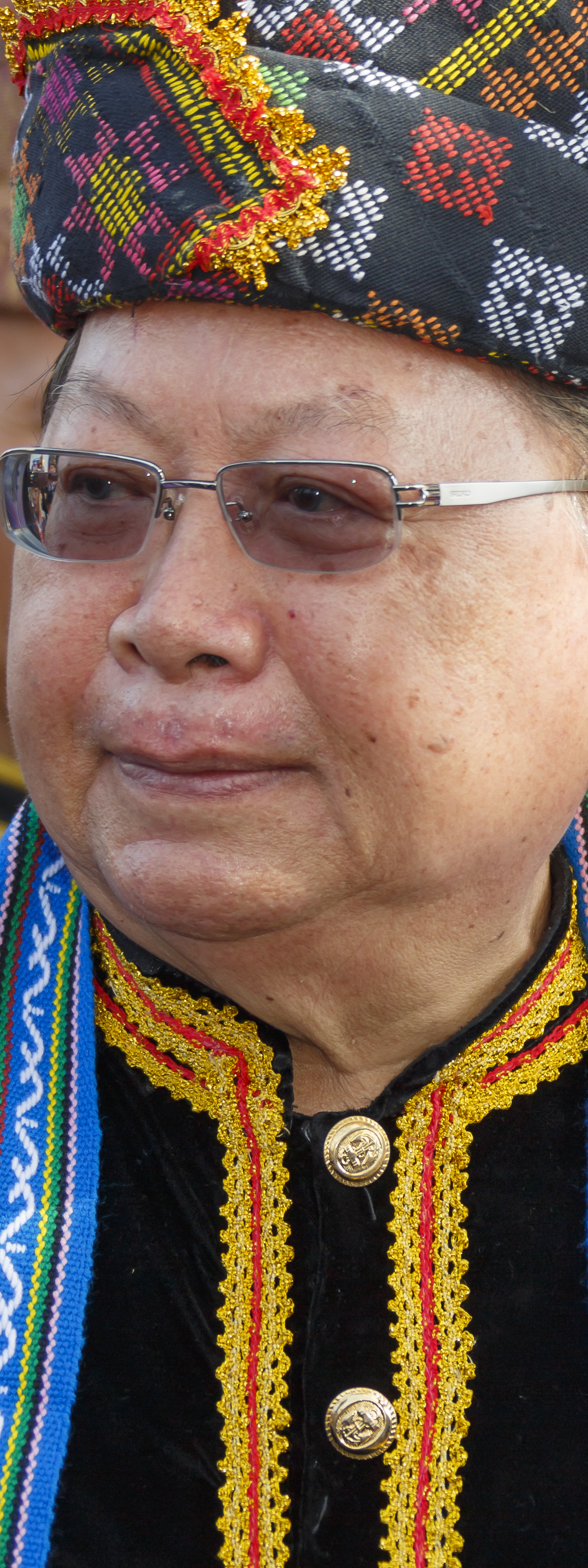
	First party	Second party	Third party
Leader	Mahathir Mohamad	Lim Kit Siang & Joseph Pairin Kitingan	Tengku Razaleigh Hamzah
Party	UMNO	DAP & USP	S46
Alliance	BN	GR	APU
Last election	57.28%, 148 seats	22.69%, 34 seats	15.50, 1 seat (Note: Malaysian Islamic Party)
Seats won	127	34	15
Seat change	▼21	▼4	▲14
Popular vote	2,985,392	1,113,488	1,218,211
Percentage	53.38%	19.91%	21.78%
Swing	▼3.90pp	▼2.78pp	▲6.28pp
Prime Minister before election
Mahathir Mohamad
BN
Prime Minister-designate
Mahathir Mohamad
BN

General elections were held in Malaysia on 20 and 21 October 1990. Voting took place in all 180 parliamentary constituencies of Malaysia, each electing one Member of Parliament to the Dewan Rakyat, the dominant house of Parliament. State elections also took place in 351 state constituencies in 11 (out of 13, except Sabah and Sarawak) states of Malaysia on the same day.

The result was a victory for the Barisan Nasional (BN) at the federal level and state except state of Kelantan with opposition alliance Angkatan Perpaduan Ummah (APU) winning all 39 state assembly seats with 24 seats going to PAS and 15 for Semangat 46.

== Background ==
The elections marked the first after United Malays National Organisation (UMNO) party split. The reconstituted UMNO Baru (New UMNO), led by incumbent Prime Minister Mahathir Mohamad, and the newly formed Semangat 46 (S46), led by Tengku Razaleigh Hamzah, contested for the first time in the elections.

It also marked the first time in country general election history when a credible, multi-ethnic coalition have been formed the challenge the dominance of Barisan Nasional. This also lead the country political scene from a dominant party system into two party system. The Muslim opposition parties, Pan-Malaysian Islamic Party (PAS), Semangat 46, Barisan Jemaah Islamiah Se-Malaysia (BERJASA) and Parti Hizbul Muslimin Malaysia (HAMIM) teamed up to form the Angkatan Perpaduan Ummah (APU). On the other hand, Semangat 46, Democratic Action Party (DAP) and Parti Bersatu Sabah (PBS), which withdrew from the Barisan Nasional (BN) at the eleventh hour of the general election, teamed up as Gagasan Rakyat. However, these two opposition alliances cooperated in the election but not openly due to the sensitivity of the secular DAP and the Islamic PAS working together.

== Results ==
At the federal level, the BN coalition under the leadership of incumbent Mahathir won 127 of the 180 parliament seats to form the federal government.

Party or alliance		Votes	%	Seats	+/–
Barisan Nasional	United Malays National Organisation	1,699,949	30.39	71	–12
Barisan Nasional	Malaysian Chinese Association	680,045	12.16	18	+1
Barisan Nasional	Parti Pesaka Bumiputera Bersatu	101,061	1.81	10	+2
Barisan Nasional	Malaysian Indian Congress	114,756	2.05	6	0
Barisan Nasional	United Sabah National Organisation	50,235	0.90	6	+1
Barisan Nasional	Parti Gerakan Rakyat Malaysia	178,305	3.19	5	0
Barisan Nasional	Parti Bansa Dayak Sarawak	22,590	0.40	4	–1
Barisan Nasional	Sarawak United Peoples' Party	102,687	1.84	4	0
Barisan Nasional	Sarawak National Party	35,754	0.64	3	–1
Barisan Nasional	Total	2,985,382	53.38	127	–21
Semangat 46		825,215	14.75	8	–
Angkatan; Perpaduan Ummah	HAMIM	8,619	0.15	–	-1
Angkatan; Perpaduan Ummah	Pan-Malaysian Islamic Party	375,869	6.72	7	+6
Angkatan; Perpaduan Ummah	Total	1,218,211	21.78	7	New
Gagasan Rakyat	Democratic Action Party	960,841	17.18	20	–4
Gagasan Rakyat	United Sabah Party	128,260	2.29	14	+4
Gagasan Rakyat	Parti Rakyat Malaysia	56,462	1.01	0	0
Gagasan Rakyat	AMIPF	32,895	0.59	–	New
Gagasan Rakyat	Total	1,050,198	18.78	34	New
Sarawak Malaysian People's Association		27,618	0.49	0	New
People's Justice Front		12,655	0.23	0	New
Sarawak United Labour Party		162	0.00	0	0
Independents		179,239	3.20	4	0
Total		5,593,217	100.00	180	+3
Valid votes		5,593,217	96.71		
Invalid/blank votes		190,198	3.29		
Total votes		5,783,415	100.00		
Registered voters/turnout		7,924,178	72.98		
Source: Nohlen et al., CLEA, IPU, Tindak Malaysia Github

Total registered voters above refer to total electorate of constituencies. Total electorate of Malaysia including two uncontested constituencies is 7958640. AMIPF candidates contested under DAP banner with the exception of AMIPF candidate of Kuala Selangor (who contested under S46). HAMIM candidate contested under S46 banner.

Semangat 46 is part of Gagasan Rakyat and Angkatan Perpaduan Ummah. Hence, for the table above, it is kept as a separate party.

Rejected Votes is 158498 and Unreturned Ballots is 31700

For the section below, invalid/blank votes includes the count of unreturned ballots. Detailed breakdown is provided under each state section.

=== By state ===
==== Johor ====
Party or alliance		Votes	%	Seats	+/–
Barisan Nasional	United Malays National Organisation	288,587	41.57	12	0
Barisan Nasional	Malaysian Chinese Association	118,197	17.03	5	0
Barisan Nasional	Malaysian Indian Congress	20,070	2.89	1	0
Barisan Nasional	Total	426,854	61.49	18	0
Semangat 46		142,227	20.49	0	New
Democratic Action Party		104,840	15.10	0	0
Parti Rakyat Malaysia		17,583	2.53	0	0
Independents		2,707	0.39	0	0
Total		694,211	100.00	18	0
Valid votes		694,211	96.07		
Invalid/blank votes		28,382	3.93		
Total votes		722,593	100.00		
Registered voters/turnout		972,171	74.33		
Source: Tindak Malaysia Github

Rejected Votes is 26670 and Unreturned ballots is 1712

==== Kedah ====
Party or alliance		Votes	%	Seats	+/–
Barisan Nasional	United Malays National Organisation	258,834	53.64	12	0
Barisan Nasional	Malaysian Chinese Association	41,871	8.68	2	0
Barisan Nasional	Total	300,705	62.32	14	0
Semangat 46		90,388	18.73	0	New
Pan-Malaysian Islamic Party		76,936	15.94	0	0
Democratic Action Party		5,360	1.11	0	0
HAMIM		8,619	1.79	0	–
Independents		537	0.11	0	0
Total		482,545	100.00	14	0
Valid votes		482,545	96.77		
Invalid/blank votes		16,130	3.23		
Total votes		498,675	100.00		
Registered voters/turnout		657,322	75.86		
Source: Tindak Malaysia Github

HAMIM contested under the S46 Banner

Rejected votes is 14838 and Unreturned ballots is 1292

==== Kelantan ====
Party or alliance		Votes	%	Seats	+/–
Semangat 46		140,281	34.19	7	New
Barisan Nasional	United Malays National Organisation	134,279	32.73	0	-11
Pan-Malaysian Islamic Party		133,251	32.48	6	+5
Independents		2,465	0.60	0	0
Total		410,276	100.00	13	0
Valid votes		410,276	97.28		
Invalid/blank votes		11,486	2.72		
Total votes		421,762	100.00		
Registered voters/turnout		536,020	78.68		
Source: Tindak Malaysia Github

Rejected votes is 10173 and Unreturned ballots is 1313

==== Kuala Lumpur ====
Party or alliance		Votes	%	Seats	+/–
Barisan Nasional	United Malays National Organisation	52,822	14.81	2	0
Barisan Nasional	Malaysian Chinese Association	64,255	18.02	0	0
Barisan Nasional	Parti Gerakan Rakyat Malaysia	36,646	10.28	1	0
Barisan Nasional	Total	153,723	43.11	3	0
Democratic Action Party		141,724	39.75	4	0
Semangat 46		33,417	9.37	0	New
Parti Rakyat Malaysia		25,259	7.08	0	–
Independents		2,432	0.68	0	0
Total		356,555	100.00	7	0
Valid votes		356,555	97.55		
Invalid/blank votes		8,954	2.45		
Total votes		365,509	100.00		
Registered voters/turnout		527,834	69.25		
Source: Tindak Malaysia Github

Rejected votes is 4215 and Unreturned Ballots is 4739

==== Labuan ====
Party or alliance		Votes	%	Seats	+/–
Barisan Nasional	United Malays National Organisation	7,130	59.69	1	+1
Independents		4,816	40.31	0	–1
Total		11,946	100.00	1	0
Valid votes		11,946	95.65		
Invalid/blank votes		543	4.35		
Total votes		12,489	100.00		
Registered voters/turnout		16,388	76.21		
Source: Tindak Malaysia Github

Rejected votes is 165 and Unreturned Ballots is 378

==== Malacca ====
Party or alliance		Votes	%	Seats	+/–
Barisan Nasional	United Malays National Organisation	81,588	40.42	3	0
Barisan Nasional	Malaysian Chinese Association	41,946	20.78	1	0
Barisan Nasional	Total	120,233	59.56	4	0
Semangat 46		40,326	19.98	0	New
Democratic Action Party		33,993	16.84	1	0
Pan-Malaysian Islamic Party		4,019	1.99	0	0
Total		201,872	100.00	5	0
Valid votes		201,872	96.80		
Invalid/blank votes		6,667	3.20		
Total votes		208,539	100.00		
Registered voters/turnout		265,059	78.68		
Source: Tindak Malaysia Githb

Rejected votes is 6284 and Unreturned Ballots is 383

==== Negeri Sembilan ====
Party or alliance		Votes	%	Seats	+/–
Barisan Nasional	United Malays National Organisation	77,005	30.50	4	0
Barisan Nasional	Malaysian Chinese Association	52,746	20.89	2	+2
Barisan Nasional	Malaysian Indian Congress	22,367	8.86	1	0
Barisan Nasional	Total	152,118	60.25	7	+2
Democratic Action Party		49,633	19.66	0	-2
Semangat 46		41,857	16.58	0	New
AMIPF		8,888	3.52	0	New
Total		252,496	100.00	7	0
Valid votes		252,496	96.00		
Invalid/blank votes		10,509	4.00		
Total votes		263,005	100.00		
Registered voters/turnout		345,468	76.13		
Source: Tindak Malaysia Github

AMIPF candidate for Negeri Sembilan contested using DAP ticket

Rejected Votes is 7935 and Unreturned Ballots is 2574

==== Pahang ====
Party or alliance		Votes	%	Seats	+/–
Barisan Nasional	United Malays National Organisation	145,611	45.10	7	0
Barisan Nasional	Malaysian Chinese Association	57,893	17.93	3	0
Barisan Nasional	Total	203,504	63.04	10	0
Semangat 46		66,337	20.55	0	New
Pan-Malaysian Islamic Party		29,960	9.28	0	0
Democratic Action Party		23,030	7.13	0	0
Total		322,831	100.00	10	0
Valid votes		322,831	95.89		
Invalid/blank votes		13,824	4.11		
Total votes		336,655	100.00		
Registered voters/turnout		452,997	74.32		
Source: Tindak Malaysia Github

Rejected votes is 11627 and Unreturned Ballots is 2197

==== Penang ====
Party or alliance		Votes	%	Seats	+/–
Barisan Nasional	United Malays National Organisation	85,315	20.38	4	0
Barisan Nasional	Parti Gerakan Rakyat Malaysia	87,998	21.02	1	0
Barisan Nasional	Malaysian Chinese Association	40,219	9.61	0	0
Barisan Nasional	Total	213,532	51.00	5	0
Democratic Action Party		170,053	40.61	6	0
Pan-Malaysian Islamic Party		14,322	3.42	0	0
Parti Rakyat Malaysia		13,620	3.25	0	0
Semangat 46		7,174	1.71	0	New
Total		418,701	100.00	11	0
Valid votes		418,701	97.39		
Invalid/blank votes		11,239	2.61		
Total votes		429,940	100.00		
Registered voters/turnout		559,223	76.88		
Source: Tindak Malaysia Github

Rejected votes is 9371 and Unreturned Ballots is 1868

==== Perak ====
Party or alliance		Votes	%	Seats	+/–
Barisan Nasional	United Malays National Organisation	190,012	27.25	11	0
Barisan Nasional	Malaysian Chinese Association	118,513	17.00	3	0
Barisan Nasional	Parti Gerakan Rakyat Malaysia	53,661	7.70	3	0
Barisan Nasional	Malaysian Indian Congress	29,442	4.22	2	0
Barisan Nasional	Total	391,628	56.17	19	0
Democratic Action Party		170,648	24.48	4	0
Semangat 46		82,971	11.90	0	0
Pan-Malaysian Islamic Party		33,955	4.87	0	0
All Malaysian Indian Progressive Front		15,499	2.22	–	New
Independents		2,516	0.36	0	0
Total		697,217	100.00	23	0
Valid votes		697,217	96.06		
Invalid/blank votes		28,613	3.94		
Total votes		725,830	100.00		
Registered voters/turnout		1,031,380	70.37		
Source: Tindak Malaysia Github

AMIPF candidate contested under DAP banner

Rejected votes is 22514 and Unreturned Votes is 6099

==== Perlis ====
Party or alliance		Votes	%	Seats	+/–
Barisan Nasional	United Malays National Organisation	47,767	65.45	2	0
Pan-Malaysian Islamic Party		13,154	18.02	0	0
Semangat 46		12,056	16.52	0	New
Total		72,977	100.00	2	0
Valid votes		72,977	95.59		
Invalid/blank votes		3,370	4.41		
Total votes		76,347	100.00		
Registered voters/turnout		99,097	77.04		
Source: Tindak Malaysia Github

Rejected Votes is 2544 and Unreturned Votes is 826

==== Sabah ====
Party or alliance		Votes	%	Seats	+/–
United Sabah Party		128,260	42.67	14	+4
Barisan Nasional	United Sabah National Organisation	50,235	16.71	6	+1
Democratic Action Party		28,547	9.50	0	–4
People's Justice Front		12,655	4.21	0	New
Independents		80,874	26.91	0	–1
Total		300,571	100.00	20	0
Valid votes		300,571	97.33		
Invalid/blank votes		8,240	2.67		
Total votes		308,811	100.00		
Registered voters/turnout		523,995	58.93		
Source: Tindak Malaysia Github

The registered voter turnout refers to total electorate of contested constituencies. Total Electorate of Sabah including one uncontested constituency (Keningau) is 543612.

Rejected Votes is 6527 and Unreturned Ballots is 1713

==== Sarawak ====
Party or alliance		Votes	%	Seats	+/–
Barisan Nasional	Sarawak United Peoples' Party	102,687	22.36	4	0
Barisan Nasional	Parti Pesaka Bumiputera Bersatu	101,061	22.01	10	+2
Barisan Nasional	Sarawak National Party	35,754	7.79	3	-2
Barisan Nasional	Parti Bansa Dayak Sarawak	22,590	4.92	4	0
Barisan Nasional	Total	262,092	57.07	21	0
Democratic Action Party		87,017	18.95	2	+1
Sarawak Malaysian People's Association		27,618	6.01	0	0
Sarawak United Labour Party		162	0.04	0	0
Independents		82,327	17.93	4	+2
Total		459,216	100.00	27	+3
Valid votes		459,216	97.59		
Invalid/blank votes		11,325	2.41		
Total votes		470,541	100.00		
Registered voters/turnout		688,216	68.37		
Source: Tindak Malaysia Github

The registered voter turnout refers to total electorate of contested constituencies. Total electorate of Sarawak including one uncontested constituency (Lubok Antu) is 703061.

==== Selangor ====
Party or alliance		Votes	%	Seats	+/–
Barisan Nasional	United Malays National Organisation	189,438	29.01	7	0
Barisan Nasional	Malaysian Chinese Association	147,706	22.62	2	-1
Barisan Nasional	Malaysian Indian Congress	42,877	6.57	2	0
Barisan Nasional	Total	380,021	58.19	11	-1
Democratic Action Party		145,996	22.36	3	+1
Semangat 46		106,175	16.26	0	New
Pan-Malaysian Islamic Party		12,358	1.89	0	0
All Malaysian Indian Progressive Front		8,508	1.30	0	New
Total		653,058	100.00	14	0
Valid votes		653,058	96.60		
Invalid/blank votes		23,007	3.40		
Total votes		676,065	100.00		
Registered voters/turnout		922,615	73.28		
Source: Tindak Malaysia Github

AMIPF contested under S46 Banner

Rejected votes is 21001 and Unreturned ballots is 2006

==== Terengganu ====
Party or alliance		Votes	%	Seats	+/–
Barisan Nasional	United Malays National Organisation	141,561	54.11	6	-2
Semangat 46		62,006	23.70	1	New
Pan-Malaysian Islamic Party		57,488	21.97	1	+1
Independents		565	0.22	0	0
Total		261,620	100.00	8	0
Valid votes		261,620	97.07		
Invalid/blank votes		7,909	2.93		
Total votes		269,529	100.00		
Registered voters/turnout		326,393	82.58		
Source: Tindak Malaysia Github

Rejected votes is 7063 and Unreturned ballot is 846

== See also ==
- Members of the Dewan Rakyat, 8th Malaysian Parliament
- 1990 Malaysian state elections
- First premiership of Mahathir Mohamad
