= List of Malaysian flags =

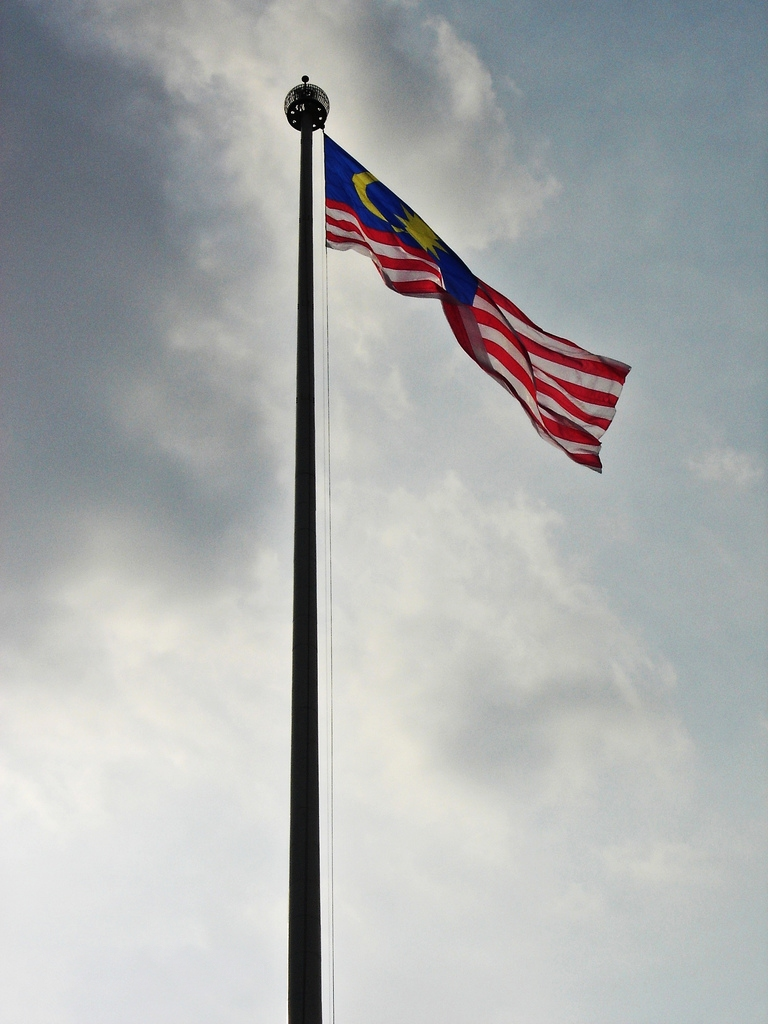
Malaysian flag in Merdeka Square

This is a list of flags used in Malaysia, both currently and historically.

== National flags ==
Flag	Date	Use	Description
	1963 onwards	Flag of Malaysia (Jalur Gemilang)	Fourteen horizontal stripes alternating red and white; in the canton, a yellow crescent and fourteen-pointed star on a blue field.
	1963 onwards	Flag of Malaysia (banner)	A swallowtail banner with fourteen vertical stripes alternating red and white; in the chief, a yellow crescent and fourteen-pointed star pointing upward on a blue field.
		Civil ensign of Malaysia	A red field with the flag of Malaysia in a blue-fimbriated canton.
		Government ensign of Malaysia	A blue field with the flag of Malaysia in the canton. Example: used by the Marine Police of the Royal Malaysian Police.

== Monarch ==
Flag	Date	Use	Description
	1988–present (modified depending on updates to the coat of arms)	Standard of the King of Malaysia	The Jata Negara, the coat of arms of Malaysia, enwreathed by two sheaves of paddy on a yellow field.
	1988–present (modified depending on updates to the coat of arms)	Standard of the Queen of Malaysia	The coat of arms of Malaysia enwreathed by two sheaves of paddy on a light green field.
		Standard of the Deputy King of Malaysia	The Jata Negara, the coat of arms of Malaysia, on two equal horizontal bands of yellow and blue.
		Standard of the Sultan of Johor	A white field defaced with a blue crescent and nine-pointed star.
		Standard of the Permaisuri of Johor	A blue field with white diagonal edges at each corner, defaced with a white crescent and seven-pointed star.
	2020–present	Standard of the Sultan of Kedah	The Kedah coat of arms enwreathed by two sheaves of paddy in a circular gold border on a yellow field.
	2018–2020	Standard of the Sultan of Kedah	The lesser installation emblem of Sultan Sallehuddin on a yellow field.
	?–2017	Standard of the Sultan of Kedah	The Kedah coat of arms enwreathed by two sheaves of paddy on a yellow field.
	2010–present	Standard of the Sultan of Kelantan	The arms of the Sultan of Kelantan on two horizontal bands of white and red.
	?–2010	Standard of the Sultan of Kelantan	A white flag with the royal arms in blue (a blue star and upward pointing crescent surmounted by a coronet similar to that from the arms, surrounded by a blue wreath) charged on the centre; an older, more intricate variant of the flag features a yellow star and crescent, a yellow crown, and a blue wreath.
		Standard of the Yang di-Pertuan Besar of Negeri Sembilan	The personal emblem of the Yang di-Pertuan Besar inside a black circle which is inscribed inside a red lozenge on a yellow background.
		Standard of the Sultan of Pahang	The Pahang state arms enwreathed by two sheaves of paddy on a white field.
	2015–present	Standard of the Sultan of Perak	The arms of the Sultan of Perak enwreathed by two sheaves of paddy on a yellow field. The flag ratio 2:3 is used by official residence with the presence of the Sultan, while the flag ratio 1:2 is used by official residences the Sultan will reside.
	1985–2014	Standard of the Sultan of Perak (Sultan Azlan Muhibbuddin Shah)	The arms of the Sultan of Perak enwreathed by two sheaves of paddy on a white field.
	1963–1984	Standard of the Sultan of Perak (Sultan Idris Al-Mutawakil Alallahi Shah)	The arms of the Sultan of Perak on a white field with the flag of Perak in the canton.
	1949–1963	Standard of the Sultan of Perak (Sultan Yussuf Izzuddin Shah)	A white field with the flag of Perak in the canton.
		Standard of the Raja of Perlis	The Perlis coat of arms on a yellow field.
		Standard of the Raja Permaisuri Perlis	A yellow field with the yellow Perlis coat of arms in a blue canton.
		Standard of the Sultan of Selangor	A yellow field defaced with the arms of the Sultan of Selangor, with a white crescent and five-pointed star in a red canton.
		Standard of the Tengku Permaisuri of Selangor	A white crescent and five-pointed star in a yellow flag with a vertical red hoist stripe.
		Standard of the Sultan of Terengganu	The arms of the Sultan of Terengganu enwreathed by two sheaves of paddy on a white field, surrounded by a brown border.
		Standard of the Sultanah of Terengganu	The arms of the Sultanah of Terengganu enwreathed by two sheaves of paddy on a yellow field.

== Governor ==
Flag	Date	Use	Description
		Standard of the Yang di-Pertua Negeri of Malacca	The coat of arms of Malacca enwreathed by two sheaves of paddy on a yellow field.
	2022–present	Standard of the Yang di-Pertua Negeri of Penang	The crest of the Yang di-Pertua Negeri of Penang on a yellow field.
	1983–2022	Standard of the Yang di-Pertua Negeri of Penang	The crest of the Yang di-Pertua Negeri of Penang inside a white circle on a yellow field.
	1963–1982	Standard of the Yang di-Pertua Negeri of Penang	The crest of the Yang di-Pertua Negeri of Penang inside a white circle on a yellow field.
		Standard of the Yang di-Pertua Negeri of Sabah	State flag of Sabah with the canton's Mount Kinabalu replaced by the coat of arms of Sabah enwreathed by two sheaves of paddy.
		Standard of the Yang di-Pertua Negeri of Sarawak	State flag of Sarawak with the central nine-pointed star replaced by the coat of arms of Sarawak enwreathed by two sheaves of paddy.

== Administrative divisions ==
=== States ===
Flag	Date	Use	Description
	1871 onwards	Flag of the state of Johor	A blue field with a white crescent and five-pointed star in a red canton.
	1912 onwards	Flag of the state of Kedah	A red field with the state coat of arms in the canton.
	1923 onwards	Flag of the state of Kelantan	A red field defaced with a white crescent and star and two white kris and two spears.
	1957 onwards	Flag of the state of Malacca	Two equal horizontal bands of red and white, with a yellow crescent and five-pointed star in a blue canton.
	1895 onwards	Flag of the state of Negeri Sembilan	A yellow field with a canton split diagonally between black and red.
	1903 onwards	Flag of the state of Pahang	Two equal horizontal bands of white and black.
	1965 onwards	Flag of the state of Penang	A blue, white, and yellow vertical tricolour defaced with a betel nut tree.
	1879 onwards	Flag of the state of Perak	A white, yellow, and black horizontal tricolour.
	1870 onwards	Flag of the state of Perlis	Two equal horizontal bands of yellow and blue.
	1988 onwards	Flag of the state of Sabah	A blue (top), white, and red tricolour, with the silhouette of Mount Kinabalu on a light blue canton.
	1988 onwards	Flag of the state of Sarawak	A yellow field with two diagonal bands of red and black, defaced with a nine-pointed star.
	1965 onwards	Flag of the state of Selangor	Red and yellow quartered, with a white crescent and five-pointed star in the canton.
	1953 onwards	Flag of the state of Terengganu	A black field defaced with a white crescent and five-pointed star, with a white border.

=== Federal territories ===
A common flag for the three federal territories was adopted by the Ministry of the Federal Territories on 20 August 2006. The flag is to be used and flown on matters and ceremonies that involve all the federal territories as a whole. An example is in national sporting events; the unified contingent of the territories would be under this common flag. However, the usage of the individual territorial flags would be given preference in events relating to individual territories.

Flag	Date	Use	Description
	2006 onwards	Flag of the Federal Territories	Three equal horizontal bands of yellow (top), blue, and red with the Malaysian coat of arms in the blue band.
	1990 onwards	Flag of Kuala Lumpur	Three equal bands of white, blue, and white with three equal horizontal stripes of red on both white bands. There is a yellow crescent and yellow fourteen-pointed star towards the hoist within the blue band. Before 2006, this flag was used to represent the entire Federal Territories.
	1992 onwards	Flag of Labuan	Three equal horizontal bands of red (top), white, and blue, with a yellow crescent and yellow fourteen-pointed star centered on the white band.
	2001 onwards	Flag of Putrajaya	Three vertical bands of blue, yellow (double width), and blue with the Malaysian coat of arms in the yellow band.

=== Order of precedence ===
Per government protocol, if a display contains the Jalur Gemilang and all the state flags of Malaysia:

- The Jalur Gemilang shall take precedence before the state flags;
- The state flags shall be ordered by the date the state's incumbent ruler takes the throne;
- The Federal Territory flag comes last

State	Current ruler	Taken office
Terengganu	Sultan Mizan Zainal Abidin	15 May 1998
Perlis	Tuanku Syed Sirajuddin	17 April 2000
Selangor	Sultan Sharafuddin Idris Shah	22 November 2001
Negeri Sembilan	Tuanku Muhriz	29 December 2008
Johor	Sultan Ibrahim Ismail	23 January 2010
Kelantan	Sultan Muhammad V	13 September 2010
Perak	Sultan Nazrin Shah	29 May 2014
Kedah	Sultan Sallehuddin	12 September 2017
Pahang	Al-Sultan Abdullah	31 January 2019
Malacca	TYT Mohd Ali Rustam	4 June 2020
Penang	TYT Ramli Ngah Talib	1 May 2025
Sarawak	TYT Wan Junaidi Tuanku Jaafar	26 January 2024
Sabah	TYT Musa Aman	1 January 2025

=== City, district, provincial and municipal ===
Some localities have their own flags, whether on the level of district, city, or even traditional localities. Some of them do not represent the locality, but rather the authority that governs the locality such as district councils.

For flags of districts, towns, and cities in Malaysia, look for the article for each state's flag where said location is in. Below is a gallery of the flags of some Malaysian localities.

Kuala Terengganu (district)

Gua Musang (district)

Johor Bahru (district)

Johor Bahru (city)

Kota Kinabalu (city)

Sungei Ujong (luak/chiefdom)

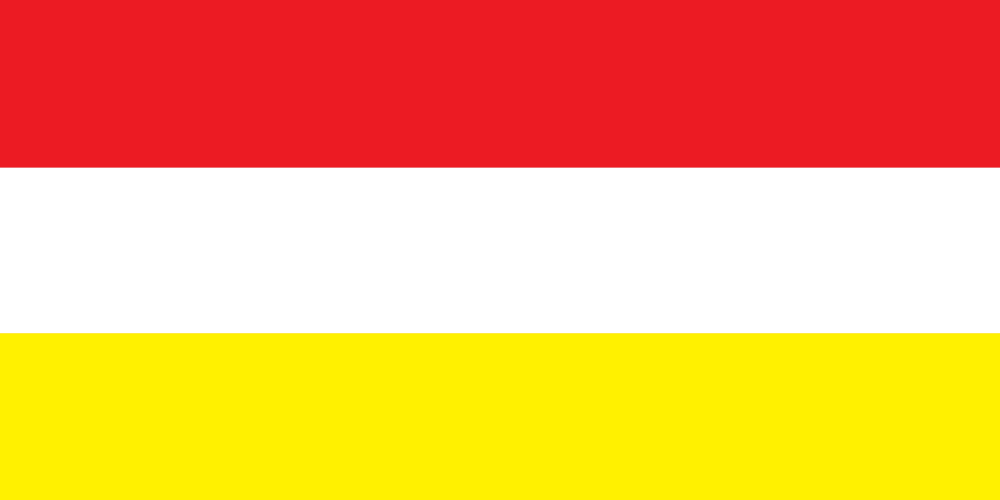
Sabak Bernam (district council)

Ipoh (city council)

== Military ==
Flag	Date	Use	Description
		Standard of the Commander-in-chief of the Malaysian Armed Forces	Three equal horizontal bands of sky blue, red, and blue, encircled by five gold five-pointed stars.
		Standard of the Malaysian Chief of Defence Forces	Three equal horizontal bands of sky blue, red, and blue, with four gold five-pointed stars.
		Flag of the Malaysian Armed Forces	Three equal horizontal bands of sky blue, red, and blue, with the crest of the Malaysian Armed Forces.
		Flag of the Malaysian Army	A red field defaced with the crest of the Malaysian Army, with the Malaysian flag with black fimbriation in the canton.
		Non-ceremonial flag of the Malaysian Army	A red field defaced with the crest of the Malaysian Army.
		Air force ensign of the Royal Malaysian Air Force	A sky blue field defaced with the Federal Star, with the Malaysian flag in the canton.
		Standard of the Chief of the Royal Malaysian Air Force	A sky blue field defaced with the Crest of the Air Force and four stars, with the Malaysian flag in the canton.
	1968 onwards	Naval ensign of the Royal Malaysian Navy	A white field defaced with blue crossed kris and an anchor, with the Malaysian flag in the canton.
		Standard of the Chief of Royal Malaysian Navy	A white field defaced with blue crossed kris and an anchor at the centre, and four blue stars, one in each corner.
	1963–1968	Naval ensign of the Royal Malaysian Navy	St. George's cross on a white field with the Malaysian flag in the canton.
	1957–1963	Naval ensign of the Royal Malayan Navy	St. George's cross on a white field with the Malayan flag in the canton.
	1963 onwards	Commissioning pennant of the Royal Malaysian Navy	

== Law enforcement flags ==
Flag	Date	Use	Description
	1997–present	Flag of the Royal Malaysian Police	Dark blue field with the crest of the Royal Malaysian Police.
	2005–present	Ensign of the Malaysian Coast Guard	A blue field defaced with the crest of the Malaysian Coast Guard, with the Malaysian flag in the canton.

== Historical ==
=== National flag ===
Flag	Date	Use	Description
	1950–1963	Flag of the Federation of Malaya	Eleven alternating red and white stripes with a dark blue rectangle, containing a gold crescent and eleven-pointed star in the canton.
	1950–1963	Flag of the Federation of Malaya (banner)	A swallowtail banner with eleven vertical stripes alternating red and white; in the chief, a yellow crescent and eleven-pointed star on a blue field.
	1957–1963	Civil ensign of the Federation of Malaya	A red field with the flag of Malaya in a blue-fimbriated canton.

=== Sultanate flags ===
Flag	Date	Use	Description
	15th century–1888	Flag of the Bruneian Empire, which once ruled most of the island of Borneo until Seludong (present-day Manila) and Banjarmasin in Kalimantan	A plain yellow flag.
		Flag of the Sultanate of Sulu, which once ruled the eastern part of Sabah after the territory been given by the Sultanate of Brunei after they sent help to settling a civil war in Brunei, although this was denied as supported by a number of old resources.	White flag with a black bordure charged with a black emblem. The emblem represented the Sultanate of Sulu identity.
	19th century	Flag of the Sultanate of Sulu, which once ruled the eastern part of Sabah after the territory been given by the Sultanate of Brunei after they sent help to settling a civil war in Brunei, although this was denied as supported by a number of old resources.	Red flag with a thin blue-white band on the hoist charged with a white emblem.
	18th century–1821	Flag of the Sultanate of Kedah	A plain red flag.
	1821–1912	Flag of the Sultanate of Kedah	Red flag charged with a pouncing tiger.
	1853–1887	The flag of the Pahang Kingdom under the Bendahara dynasty	A plain black flag. Black represented the colour of the Bendahara.
	1887–1903	The flag of the Pahang Sultanate	Black flag with a thin white stripe at its hoist. Black represented the colour of the Bendahara, while white represented the ruling Sultan.
	1903–1957	Naval jack of the Pahang Sultanate	White and black diagonally quartered flag.
	1699	Flag of the Johor Sultanate	A plain white flag. This flag was used by multiple Malay sultanates at the same time.
	18th century–1912	Flag of the Kelantan Sultanate	A plain white flag. This flag was used by multiple Malay sultanates at the same time.
	18th century–1879	Flag of the Perak Sultanate	A plain white flag. This flag was used by multiple Malay sultanates at the same time.
	1855–1865	Flag of the Johor Sultanate	Black flag with a white canton.
	1865–1871	Flag of the Johor Sultanate	Black flag with a red canton charged with a white saltire.
	1784–1875	Flag of the Selangor Sultanate	Yellow flag with two red bands at the top and bottom.
	1875–1965	Flag of the Selangor Sultanate	Red and yellow horizontally quartered flag, charged with a yellow crescent and star on the upper hoist.
	1912–1923	Flag of the Kelantan Sultanate	White flag with a blue bordure at the hoist, chief, and fly, charged with a blue boat, on top of which lies a scripture stylised as a feline. The scripture is written in Jawi script, with the tip of the tail writing "کراجاءن کلنتن" (Kelantanese Government), and the main body containing two passages from the Qur'an, an excerpt of the 13th verse of the 61st chapter, As-Saff "نصر من الله وفتح قىيب" (Help from Allah, and a speedy victory).
	1912–1933	Flag of the Terengganu Sultanate	Black flag with a white band at its hoist.
	1933–1953	Flag of the Terengganu Sultanate	Black flag with a white band at its hoist, charged with an upwards white crescent and star on the chief of the black field.
	1933–1953	Government flag of the Terengganu Sultanate	Black flag with a white band at its hoist, charged with an upwards black crescent and star on the chief of the hoist band and white saltire on the black field.

=== State flags ===
Flag	Date	Use	Description
	1973–1988	Flag of the state of Sarawak	Red and white horizontal bicolour flag with a blue pile based at the hoist.
	1963–1982	Flag of the state of Sabah	Four equal horizontal bands of red, white, yellow, and blue, with a green canton charged with a brown silhouette of Mount Kinabalu.
	1982–1988	Flag of the state of Sabah	Blue and white horizontal bicolour flag with a red pile based at the hoist.
	1959–1965	Flag of the state of Singapore as a British self-governing colony (1959–1963) and as part of Malaysia (1963–1965)	A horizontal bicolour of red over white, charged in the canton with a white crescent facing towards the fly and a pentagon of five stars.

=== Colonial and other national flags ===
Flag	Date	Use	Description
	1511–1521	Flag of the Kingdom of Portugal (Portuguese Malacca)	A white field with the Portuguese coat of arms in the centre.
	1521–1578	Flag of the Kingdom of Portugal (Portuguese Malacca)	A white field with the Portuguese coat of arms in the centre.
	1578–1640	Flag of the Kingdom of Portugal (Portuguese Malacca)	A white field with the Portuguese coat of arms in the centre.
	1580–1640	Flag of the Iberian Union (Portuguese Malacca)	A red Saltire resembling two crossed, roughly pruned (knotted) branches, on a white field.
	1580–1640	Royal flag of the Iberian Union (Portuguese Malacca)	A red field with the royal coat of arms in the centre.
	1616–1640	Flag of the Kingdom of Portugal (Portuguese Malacca) (putative flag)	A white field with the Portuguese coat of arms in the centre.
	1640–1641	Flag of the Kingdom of Portugal (Portuguese Malacca)	A white field with the Portuguese coat of arms in the centre.
	1641–1795	The Prince's Flag in the Dutch Republic (Dutch Malacca)	A horizontal tricolour of orange, white, and blue.
	1652–1672	States Flag in the Dutch Republic (Dutch Malacca)	A horizontal tricolour of red, white, and blue.
	1795–1801	Flag of the Kingdom of Great Britain	A superimposition of the flags of England and Scotland.
	1801–1818; 1858–1874	Flag of the United Kingdom	A superimposition of the flags of England and Scotland with the Saint Patrick's Saltire (representing Ireland).
	1818–1825	Flag of the United Kingdom of the Netherlands (Dutch Malacca)	A horizontal tricolour of red, white, and blue.
	1895–1946	Flag of the Federated Malay States	Four equal horizontal stripes of white (top), red, yellow, and black, superimposed in the centre on a small white ellipse depicting a running tiger.
	1946–1948	Flag of the Malayan Union	Four equal horizontal stripes of white (top), red, yellow, and black, superimposed in the centre on a small white ellipse depicting a running tiger.
	1948–1950	Flag of the Federation of Malaya	Four equal horizontal stripes of white (top), red, yellow, and black, superimposed in the centre on a small white ellipse depicting a running tiger.
	1895–1946	Naval ensign of the Federated Malay States	White-black-yellow-red diagonally quartered flag. This flag was also used as the ensign for the battleship HMS Malaya.
	1902–1946	Flag of North Borneo	A blue ensign defaced with the badge of the North Borneo Chartered Company.
	1902–1946	Civil ensign of North Borneo	A red ensign defaced with the badge of the North Borneo Chartered Company.
	1948–1963	Flag of the Crown Colony of North Borneo	After World War II, North Borneo became a crown colony. A blue ensign was adopted with the new badge instead of that of the North Borneo Company.
	1912–1946	Flag of the Crown Colony of Labuan	A blue ensign defaced with a ship.
	1941–1945	Flag of the Empire of Japan (Malaya and North Borneo)	The flag uses a 7:10 height-to-width proportion.
	1944–1945	Flag of the Malayan Volunteer Army under the Japanese Occupation	Blue flag with a red canton charged with two white crossed krisses.
	1944–1945	Flag of the Malayan Volunteer Army under the Japanese Occupation	Blue flag with a red canton charged with two white crossed krisses, and a smaller white lower hoist canton charged with regimental lettering. The lettering reads "マライ義勇軍" (romanised: Marai Giyūgun).
	1948–1952	Flag of the Crown Colony of Singapore	A blue ensign defaced with a white disc containing a crown within a red inverted pall.
	1952–1959	Flag of the Crown Colony of Singapore	A blue ensign defaced with a white disc containing a crown within a red inverted pall.
	1949–1952	Flag of the Crown Colony of Penang	A blue ensign defaced with the pre-1985 lesser arms of Penang.
	1952–1957	Flag of the Crown Colony of Penang	Flag badge depicting the areca nut palm tree leaved and fructed proper on a mound with a wreath of the colours of the settlement arms adopted on 16 June 1952 by the Settlement Council.
	1951–1957	Flag of the Crown Colony of Malacca	A blue ensign defaced with a depiction of A Famosa.

== Proposed flags ==
Flag	Use	Description
	Proposed republican flag of Malaya. Known as Sang Saka Malaya.	Red and white horizontal bicolour flag charged with twelve yellow stars on the upper hoist.
	First proposed flag of Malaya	Blue flag charged with two red crossed krisses surrounded by eleven white stars.
	Second proposed flag of Malaya	Blue flag charged with two red crossed krisses surrounded by five white stars which is surrounded by six white stars.
	Third proposed flag of Malaya	Eleven alternating blue and white horizontal stripes with a red canton charged with a white crescent and star.

== Political flags ==
Flag	Date	Use	Description
Current
Link to file	2021–present	People's Power Party	
	2020–present	Homeland Fighter's Party	Turquoise flag charged with the party logo atop its name in white.
	2020–present	Gabungan Rakyat Sabah	White flag charged with a light blue figure resembling Mount Kinabalu atop its abbreviated name in blue, red, and light blue.
	2020–present	Malaysian United Democratic Alliance	Black flag charged with its name in white.
	2019–present	Parti Bumiputera Perkasa Malaysia	Yellow flag charged with the party logo in red.
	2019–present	Malaysian Advancement Party	
	2017–present	Malaysian United Indigenous Party	Red flag charged with the party logo in white.
	2016–present	Youth Front Party	
	2016–present	Sabah People's Hope Party	
	2015–present	Pakatan Harapan	Red flag charged with the party logo in white.
	2015–present	National Trust Party	Orange flag charged with the party logo in white.
Link to file	2014–present	Parti Sarawak Bersatu	
Link to file	2013–present	United Sabah National Organisation	
Link to file	2013–present	Love Sabah Party	
Link to file	2013–present	Sabah Nationality Party	
	2013–present	Malaysian Indian Justice Party	
Link to file	2013–present	Parti Sejahtera Angkatan Perpaduan Sabah	
Link to file	2013–present	Sabah Native Co-operation Party	
	2013–present	Parti Gagasan Rakyat Sabah	
	2013–present	Sabah National People's Unity Organisation	
	2011–present	Malaysian United People's Party	
	2009–present	Love Malaysia Party	
Link to file	2007–present	Malaysian Indian United Party	
	1999–present	People's Justice Party	Light blue flag with two red bands on the hoist and fly charged with a white symbol made of two crescents facing each other, resembling an eye.
	1998–present	Socialist Party of Malaysia	
	1994–present	United Progressive Kinabalu Organisation	
	1994–present	Sabah Progressive Party	
	1989–present	Liberal Democratic Party	
Link to file	1986–present	Punjabi Party of Malaysia	
Link to file	1985–present	United Sabah Party	
	2020–present	Pan-Malaysian Islamic Front	Burgundy flag charged with a stylised white star.
	1977–2020	Pan-Malaysian Islamic Front	Green flag charged with a white star.
	1976–present	Malaysian Indian Muslim Congress	A tricolour of green, white, and red, with a central yellow disc bearing the text "KIMMA". Seen here depicted in the logo of the party.
Link to file	1973–present	Barisan Nasional	
	1968–present	Parti Gerakan Rakyat Malaysia	
	1965–present	Democratic Action Party	White flag charged with a blue circle and red rocket.
	1955–present	Malaysian Islamic Party	Red and white horizontal bicolour flag charged with a green disc on the upper hoist. (The hoist used to contain the inscription of "Allah" and "Muhammad" in white Jawi script prior to modifications in 1971.)
	1955–present	Parti Rakyat Malaysia	
	1958–present	Malaysian Chinese Association	Blue flag charged with a yellow federal star. Modified to current form since 1963.
	1946–present	United Malays National Organisation	Red and white horizontal bicolour flag charged with a yellow disc defaced with a green kris.
	1946–present	Malaysian Indian Congress	
Former
	1996–2020	Parti Aspirasi Rakyat Sarawak	
	1989–1996	Parti Melayu Semangat 46	Yellow flag charged with a central white disc defaced with green text reading "46", and charged with two green crossed krisses on the upper hoist.
Link to file	1989–2001	People's Justice Front	
Link to file	1978–2008	United Pasok Nunukragang National Organisation	
Link to file	1975–1991	Sabah People's United Front	
	1962–1990	North Kalimantan Communist Party	
	1962–1990	Sarawak People's Guerilla Force	
	1957–1973	Alliance Party	Blue flag charged with a white boat.
	1945–1948	Parti Kebangsaan Melayu Malaya	Red and white horizontal bicolour flag charged with twelve yellow stars on the upper hoist. Known as the "Sang Saka Malaya", it is commonly associated with the republican‐independence movements in Malaysia, and, to an extent, the leftwing movements.
	1938–1945	Kesatuan Melayu Muda	Red and white horizontal bicolour flag. Known as the "sang saka", precursor to the "Sang Saka Malaya", it was used to represent an independent Malaysia before the Malaysian flag was eventually chosen. It was based on the flag of the Kebangsaan Melayu Malaya, which in turn is based on the flag of Indonesia.
	1930–1989	Malayan Communist Party	

== University flags ==
Flag	Date	Use	Description
	1962–present	Flag of the University of Malaya	A banner of the University's coat of arms
	1984–present	Flag of the International Islamic University Malaysia	Turquoise flag charged with the university emblem in gold, black, and white.
	1984–present	Flag of the Universiti Utara Malaysia	Light blue flag charged with the university emblem. Minor changes were done after the redesign of the university emblem.
	2006–present	Flag of the National Defence University of Malaysia	Similar to the tricolour of the Armed Forces of Malaysia but with the university seal on top.

== See also ==
- Armorial of Malaysia
