= List of political parties in Malaysia =

Timeline of Malaysian political parties in Peninsular Malaysia with origins from UMNO since 1946

This is a list of political parties in Malaysia, including existing and historical ones.

== Legislation ==
Under the current legislation, all political parties (termed "Political Associations") must be registered under the Societies Act.

=== Anti-hopping parties law ===
In Malaysian politics, a frog (Malay: katak politik) (Sabahan: Buhangkut politik) refers to an act where a politician crosses the bench from one party to another (changing support). This term was first coined during the 1994 Sabah state elections after United Sabah Party losing its majority even the party won the state elections. Despite its usage nationwide, it is more familiar within the state of Sabah. Since May 25, 2023, nine states of Malaysia has approved the "Anti-Switching Parties Law" or "Anti-Hopping Parties Law" for both states legislative assembly and parliament including Sabah and Sarawak.

=== Election expenses ===
The Election Offences Act 1954 regulates the maximum expenses allowed for candidates vying for parliamentary seats and for state seats during the campaign period (excluding before the nomination day and after election day). The permissible campaign expenditure set by the Election Offences Act (1954) is RM 100,000 per candidate for state seats and RM 200,000 per candidate for federal seats. According to this guideline, with 505 state seats and 222 parliamentary seats in the 2013 general election, the maximum amount that Barisan Nasional was allowed to spend was only about RM 95 million. Due to the lack of records and regulations, Malaysian politicians may not even know how much they spent on their campaigns or overspending the expenditure than permitted by law. Another related problem was the secrecy surrounding political funds and their use. Although many politicians, including members of newly appointed cabinets, voluntarily disclosed their personal finances, such disclosure is not compulsory and many sources of revenue remain obscure.

=== Election deposits ===
The deposit was RM 10,000 to contest a parliamentary seat, or RM 5,000 to contest a state assembly seat. The deposit is used to pay for infringements of election laws and is returned after polling day unless the candidate loses and fails to garner more than 12.5 per cent or one-eighth of the votes cast. Additionally it is required that each candidate provide a RM 5,000 deposit for cleaning up banners and posters after the election.

=== Political donations ===
Political donations are legal in Malaysia. There is no limit, and parties are not obliged to disclose the source of the funding, which makes political donations a vague subject but still entirely legal in the country. All political donations are allowed to be given into accounts of individuals and accounts of the political party. Anonymous donors and foreigners may request not to reveal their identities.

Political parties are funded by contributions from:

- party members and individual supporters (via membership fees/dues/subscriptions and/or local/foreign small donations),
- organisations, which share their political views (e.g. by trade union affiliation fees) or which stand to benefit from their activities (e.g. by local/foreign corporate donations) or
- taxpayers respectively the general revenue fund (by grants that are called state aid, government or public funding).

== Currently active parties ==
=== Parties represented in the Parliament and/or the state legislative assemblies ===
This is the list of coalitions and parties that have representation in the Parliament of Malaysia (Dewan Rakyat & Dewan Negara) and/or the state legislative assemblies, sorted by seats held in the Dewan Rakyat, the lower house of the Parliament of Malaysia. Unless noted, numbers exclude independents and loose allies linked to each party

Coalition and Party	Abbr	Leader	Ideology	Position	Dewan Rakyat	Dewan Negara	State assemblies	Vote share (2022)	Federal government
Pakatan Harapan; Alliance of Hope^{[A]}	PH	Anwar Ibrahim	Progressivism; Reformism; Social liberalism; Social democracy	Centre-left to left-wing	77 / 222	20 / 70	126 / 607	37.00%	Government
Perikatan Nasional; National Alliance^{[B]}	PN	Ahmad Samsuri Mokhtar	Religious nationalism; National conservatism	Right-wing to far-right	68 / 222	8 / 70	204 / 607	30.04%	Opposition
Barisan Nasional; National Front	BN	Ahmad Zahid Hamidi	Conservatism	Centre-right to right-wing	30 / 222	13 / 70	128 / 607	22.24%	Government
Gabungan Parti Sarawak; Sarawak Parties Alliance	GPS	Abang Johari	Sarawak nationalism; Conservatism	Centre-right to right-wing	23 / 222	7 / 70	79 / 607	4.26%	Government
Gabungan Rakyat Sabah; Sabah People's Coalition^{[C]}	GRS	Hajiji Noor	Sabah nationalism; Conservatism	Centre to centre-right	7 / 222	3 / 70	36 / 607	1.03%	Government
Parti Warisan; Heritage Party	Warisan	Shafie Apdal	Progressivism; Multiracialism; Nationalism	Centre	3 / 222	0 / 70	25 / 607	1.93%	Government
Parti Kesejahteraan Demokratik Masyarakat; Social Democratic Harmony Party	KDM	Priscella Peter	Sabah regionalism; Populism	Centre	2 / 222	0 / 70	1 / 607	0.34%	Government
Parti Solidariti Tanah Airku; Homeland Solidarity Party ^{[E]}	STAR	Jeffrey Kitingan	Sabah regionalism	Centre	1 / 222	1 / 70	2 / 505	0.19%	Government
Malaysian United Democratic Alliance; Ikatan Demokratik Malaysia^{[F]}	MUDA	Amira Aisya Abdul Aziz	Social democracy	Centre-left	1 / 222	0 / 70	0 / 607	0.48%	Opposition
Parti Bangsa Malaysia; Malaysian Nation Party	PBM	Larry Sng	Multiracialism	Centre-left	1 / 222	0 / 70	0 / 607	0.11%	Government
^{A} Excludes the United Progressive Kinabalu Organisation, which was part of the coalition in the 2022 election but subsequently left in 2025.^{B} The coalition contested seats in Kelantan and Terengganu using the symbol of the Pan-Malaysian Islamic Party while other states were contested using the symbol of the coalition.^{C} Excludes the Homeland Solidarity Party and Sabah Progressive Party, which were part of the coalition in the 2022 election but subsequently left in 2025.^{D} The party was taken over by former Bersatu/Perikatan Nasional members.^{E} The party contested as a part of Gabungan Rakyat Sabah but withdrew from the coalition before the 2025 Sabah state election.^{F} The party contested in an electoral pact with Pakatan Harapan.

== Coalitions and electoral pacts ==
=== Pakatan Harapan (PH, Alliance of Hope) ===
The list is sorted by the year in which the respective parties were legalised and registered with the Registrar of Societies (ROS).

Party	Abbr	Leader	Ideology	Position	Registered	International affiliation	Notes
Democratic Action Party; Parti Tindakan Demokratik	DAP	Anthony Loke Siew Fook	• Social democracy • National secularism	Left-wing	1966	Progressive Alliance	
Parti Keadilan Rakyat; People's Justice Party	PKR	Anwar Ibrahim	• Social liberalism • Malaysian reformism	Centre-left to left-wing	2003 (1991)	N/A	^{[A]}
Parti Amanah Negara; National Trust Party	AMANAH	Mohamad Sabu	• Islamic modernism • National progressivism	Centre to centre-left	2015 (1978)	N/A	^{[B]}
^{A} Originally registered as Ikatan Masyarakat Islam Malaysia (Muslim Community Union of Malaysia) in 1991, the party was reorganised with new leadership in 1999 and renamed Parti Keadilan Nasional (National Justice Party). In 2003, the party merged with Parti Rakyat Malaysia (Malaysian People's Party) and was again renamed to its current name. In 2005, a small left-wing group left the party to reorganise Parti Rakyat Malaysia just prior to its de-registration.^{B} Originally registered as Parti Pekerja-Pekerja Malaysia (Malaysian Worker's Party) in 1978, the party was reorganised with new leadership in 2015 and renamed to its current name.

=== Perikatan Nasional (PN, National Alliance) ===
The list is sorted by the year in which the respective parties were legalised and registered with the Registrar of Societies (ROS).

Party	Abbr	Leader	Ideology	Position	Registered	International affiliation	Notes
Parti Islam Se-Malaysia; Malaysian Islamic Party	PAS	Abdul Hadi Awang	Islamism	Right-wing to far-right	1955	Muslim Brotherhood (Ikhwanul Muslimin)	
Parti Gerakan Rakyat Malaysia; Malaysian People's Movement Party	GERAKAN	Dominic Lau Hoe Chai	Liberalism; Conservative politics	Centre to centre-right	1968	Liberal International (observer)	
Parti Wawasan Negara; National Vision Party	WAWASAN	Hamzah Zainudin	Malay nationalism Multiracialism; Conservatism	Right-wing	2026 (2009)	N/A	^{A}
Parti Pribumi Bersatu Malaysia; Malaysian United Indigenous Party	BERSATU	Muhyiddin Yassin	Malay nationalism	Right-wing to centre-right	2016	N/A	
Malaysian Indian People's Party; Parti Rakyat India Malaysia	MIPP	Punithan Paramsiven	Malaysian Indians' interests	N/A	2019	N/A	
Parti Pejuang Tanah Air; Homeland Fighters' Party	PEJUANG	Mukhriz Mahathir	Malay nationalism	Right-wing	2021	N/A	
^{A} Originally registered as Parti Cinta Malaysia (Love Malaysia Party) in 2009, the party was reorganised with new leadership in 2026 and renamed to its current name

=== Barisan Nasional (BN, National Front) ===
The list is sorted by the year in which the respective parties were legalised and registered with the Registrar of Societies (ROS).

Party	Abbr	Leader	Ideology	Position	Registered	International affiliation	Notes
United Malays National Organisation; Pertubuhan Kebangsaan Melayu Bersatu	UMNO	Ahmad Zahid Hamidi	• Ketuanan Melayu • National conservatism	Right-wing to far-right	1946 (1988)	N/A	^{A}
Malaysian Indian Congress; Kongres India Malaysia	MIC	Vigneswaran Sanasee	• Malaysian Indian interest • Social conservatism	Right-wing	1946 (1963)	N/A	^{B}
Malaysian Chinese Association; Persatuan Cina Malaysia	MCA	Wee Ka Siong	• Malaysian Chinese interest • Social conservatism	Right-wing to centre-right	1949 (1963)	N/A	^{C}
Parti Bersatu Rakyat Sabah; United Sabah People's Party	PBRS	Arthur Joseph Kurup	Sabah nationalism	Right-wing to centre-right	1994	N/A	
People's Progressive Party; Parti Progresif Penduduk	myPPP	Loga Bala Mohan Jaganathan	Liberal conservatism Civic nationalism	Centre-right	1953 (2023)	N/A	^{D}
^{A} Originally registered in 1946, UMNO was deregistered in 1988 and the then Prime Minister registered a new party, UMNO Baru the same year. UMNO Baru is considered a successor party to the original UMNO. The suffix Baru or New was dropped from the name in July the same year^{B} Originally registered as the Malayan Indian Congress, the name was changed to the current name after the formation of Malaysia in 1963^{C} Originally registered as the Malayan Chinese Association, the name was changed to the current name after the formation of Malaysia in 1963^{D} Following the 2018 general election, the party suffered a split and was de-registered in 2019. It was re-registered in 2023.

=== Gerakan Tanah Air (GTA, Homeland Movement) ===
The list is sorted by the year in which the respective parties were legalised and registered with the Registrar of Societies (ROS).

Party	Abbr	Leader	Ideology	Position	Registered	International affiliation	Notes
Barisan Jemaah Islamiah Se-Malaysia; Pan Malaysian Islamic Front	BERJASA	Zamani bin Ibrahim	Islamic democracy National conservatism	Centre	1977	N/A	
Parti Bumiputera Perkasa Malaysia; Malaysia Mighty Bumiputera Party	PUTRA	Ibrahim Ali	National conservatism Malaysian reformism	Centre-right	2019	N/A	
National Indian Muslim Alliance Party; National Indian Muslim Alliance Party	IMAN	Mohammed Mosin Abdul Razak	Islamic democracy Social liberalism	Centre	2019	N/A	

=== Gabungan Parti Sarawak (GPS, Sarawak Parties Coalition) ===
The list is sorted by the year in which the respective parties were legalised and registered with the Registrar of Societies (ROS).

Party	Abbr	Leader	Ideology	Position	Registered	International affiliation	Notes
Parti Pesaka Bumiputera Bersatu; United Traditional Bumiputera Party	PBB	Abang Abdul Rahman Johari Abang Openg	Ketuanan Bumiputera; Right-wing populism	Right-wing	1973	N/A	^{A}
Progressive Democratic Party; Parti Demokratik Progresif	PDP	Tiong King Sing	Conservatism; Nationalism; Multiracialism	Centre-right to right-wing	2002 (2017)	N/A	^{B}
Sarawak United Peoples' Party; Parti Rakyat Bersatu Sarawak	SUPP	Sim Kui Hian	Regionalism	Centre	1959	N/A	
Parti Rakyat Sarawak; Sarawak People's Party	PRS	Joseph Salang Gandum	N/A	Centre	2004	N/A	
^{A} The party is a result of a merger between Parti Bumiputera Sarawak (Sarawak Bumiputera Party), itself a merger established in 1968 between Parti Negara Sarawak (National Party of Sarawak or PANAS established in 1960) and Barisan Ra'ayat Jati Sarawak (Sarawak Native People's Front or BARJASA established in 1961), and Parti Pesaka Anak Sarawak (Sarawak Native's Heritage Party or PESAKA established in 1961)^{B} Originally registered as the Sarawak Progressive Democratic Party, the name was changed to its current form to facilitate the expansion of the party beyond the state of Sarawak

=== Gabungan Rakyat Sabah (GRS, Sabah People's Coalition) ===
The list is sorted by the year in which the respective parties were legalised and registered with the Registrar of Societies (ROS).

Party	Abbr	Leader	Ideology	Position	Registered	International affiliation	Notes
Parti Bersatu Sabah; United Sabah Party	PBS	Maximus Ongkili; Joachim Gunsalam (Acting)	Bumiputera's rights and regionalism Social conservatism	Centre-right	1985		
Parti Liberal Demokratik; Liberal Democratic Party	LDP	Chin Su Phin	Sabah regionalism Liberalism	Centre	1989		
United Progressive Kinabalu Organisation Pertubuhan Kinabalu Progresif Bersatu	UPKO	Ewon Benedick	• Sabah regionalism • Malaysian nationalism	Centre to centre-right	1999 (1994)	N/A	^{[A]}
Parti Gagasan Rakyat Sabah; Sabah People's Idea Party	GAGASAN	Hajiji Noor	Sabah nationalism Multiracialism	Centre to centre-right	2013		
Parti Cinta Sabah; Love Sabah Party	PCS	Anifah Aman	Sabah regionalism	Centre	2013		
Parti Harapan Rakyat Sabah; Sabah People's Hope Party	PHRS	Liew Yun Fah	Sabah regionalism	Centre	2016		
^{A} Originally registered as Parti Demokratik Sabah (Sabah Democratic Party) in 1994, the party was renamed as United Pasokmomogun Kadazandusun Murut Organisation in 1999 and renamed further to its current name in 2019.: This political coalition party was registered and legalised on March 11, 2022 under Societies Act 1966.

== Parties without representation in the Parliament and the state legislative assemblies ==
This is the list of active coalitions and parties that do not have representation in the Parliament of Malaysia (Dewan Rakyat and Dewan Negara) and the state legislative assemblies, sorted by the year in which the respective parties were legalised and registered with the Registrar of Societies (ROS). Parties that are part of a coalition that is represented are not listed here even if the party itself is not represented. This list does not include parties that are active but have yet to be registered with the ROS or EC such as the Green Party of Malaysia.

=== Parties registered with the ROS and EC ===
Political parties registered with the Registrar of Societies (ROS) and with the Election Commission (EC).

Party	Abbr	Leader	Ideology	Position	Registered	International affiliation	Notes
Parti Rakyat Malaysia; Malaysian People's Party	PRM	Mohd Hashim Saaludin	Democratic socialism Left-wing nationalism	Left-wing	1955 (1989)		^{A}
Malaysian Ceylonese Congress; Kongres Ceylonese Malaysia	MCC	Mahendranathan Thuraiappah	N/A	N/A	1958 (1970)		
Malaysian Indian Muslim Congress; Kongres India Muslim Malaysia	KIMMA	Syed Ibrahim Kader	Islamism; Conservatism	Centre-right	1976		^{B}
Parti Punjabi Malaysia; Malaysian Punjabi Party	PPM	Datuk Gurjeet Singh Rhande	N/A	N/A	1986		^{C}
Sabah Progressive Party; Parti Maju Sabah	SAPP	Yong Teck Lee	Sabah regionalism	Centre	1994	N/A	
Malaysian United People's Party; Parti Bersatu Rakyat Malaysia	MUPP	Roy Nazry	Nationalism	Right-wing	1994 (2011)		^{D}
Parti Sosialis Malaysia; Socialist Party of Malaysia	PSM	Michael Jeyakumar Devaraj	Socialism; Left-wing populism	Left-wing	1998		
Malaysia Makkal Sakti Party; Parti Makkal Sakti Malaysia	MMSP	R.S. Thanenthiran	Dravidianism	Centre-right	2009		
Parti Kebangsaan Sabah; Sabah Nationality Party	PKS	Thomas Anggan	Sabah regionalism	Centre-right	2013		
United Sabah National Organisation (New); Pertubuhan Kebangsaan Sabah Bersatu (Baru)	USNO Baru	Pandikar Amin Mulia	National conservatism Sabah regionalism	Centre-right	2013		^{E}
Pertubuhan Perpaduan Rakyat Kebangsaan Sabah; Sabah National People's Unity Organisation	PERPADUAN	Jack Giau	Sabah regionalism	Centre-right	2013		
Parti Bumi Kenyalang; Land of the Hornbill Party	PBK	Voon Lee Shan	Sarawak regionalism Self determination Nationalism	Centre to centre-right	2013	N/A	
Parti Bansa Dayak Sarawak; Sarawak Dayak People's Party	PBDS	John Brian Anthony	Dayak nationalism Social democracy	Centre-left	2013	N/A	
Parti Aspirasi Rakyat Sarawak; Sarawak People's Aspiration Party	ASPIRASI	Buln Patrick Ribos	Sarawak nationalism Self-determination; State separatism	Centre-left	1996 (2020)	N/A	
Sarawak People's Energy Party; Parti Tenaga Rakyat Sarawak	TERAS	Banyi Beriak	Sarawak nationalism National conservative	Centre to centre-right	2013		^{G}
Sarawak Alternative Struggle Party; Parti Alternatif Perjuangan Sarawak	SAP / PAPS	Snowdan Lawan	Sarawak nationalism Human rights Regionalism; Multiracial politics National conservative	Centre-right to right-wing	2027		
Parti Aspirasi Nasional; National Aspiration Party	PAN / ASPINAS	Niel Raffael	Sarawak nationalism Youth politic rights Multiracial politics	Centre to centre-right	2026		
Parti Wawasan Rakyat; Sarawak People's Vision Party	PWR / WAWASAN	Affendi Jeman	National conservatism Economic liberalism Sarawak nationalism	Centre	2018 (2026)	N/A	
Minority Rights Action Party; Parti Tindakan Hak Minoriti	MIRA	K. Palanisamy	Liberal democracy Minority rights	N/A	2013		^{F}
People's Alternative Party; Parti Alternatif Rakyat	PAP	A. David Dass	Liberal democracy	Centre	2014		
Malaysian United Party; Parti Bersama Malaysia	BERSAMA	Syukri Razab (president); Rafizi Ramli (de facto)	Liberal democracy	Centre to centre-left	2016		
Penang Front Party; Parti Barisan Pulau Pinang	PFP	Razalif Mohd Zain	Penang regionalism	Centre-right	2016		
Parti Perpaduan Rakyat Sabah; Sabah People's Unity Party	PPRS	Mohd Arshad Abdul Mualap	Social conservatism Economic liberalism Sabah regionalism	Centre-left	2017	N/A	
Malaysian Advancement Party; Parti Kemajuan Malaysia	KEMAJUAN	Waytha Moorthy Ponnusamy	Egalitarianism; Humanism	N/A	2019		
Parti Orang Asli Malaysia; Malaysian Orang Asli Party	ASLI	Rashid Ka'	Orang Asli indigenous rights	N/A	2022	N/A	
Parti Sejahtera Angkatan Perpaduan Sabah; Sabah Wellbeing & Unity Front Party	SAPU	Abdul Banning Mohd.	Sabah regionalism	Centre-right	2013		
Sabah Peace Party; Parti Damai Sabah	SPP	Berman Angkap	Sabah regionalism	Centre-right	2013		
Parti Kerjasama Anak Negeri; Sabah Native Co-operation Party	Anak Negeri	Henrynus Amin	Sabah regionalism	Centre-right	2013		
Parti Impian Sabah; Sabah Dream Party	PISabah	Michel Alok	Sabah nationalism	N/A	2023		
^{A} PRM was originally registered as Partai Ra'ayat. It was renamed Parti Sosialis Rakyat Malaysia (Malaysian People's Socialist Party) in 1970 and then renamed again to its current name in 1989. In 2003 the party officially merged with Parti Keadilan Nasional to form Parti Keadilan Rakyat. Some members of the original PRM re-organised PRM as a functional political party in 2005 after some disagreement on the ideology and direction of the newly merged party, PKR.^{B} KIMMA was accepted to become the associate member of UMNO with the obserser status on 27 August 2010.^{C} The Punjabi Party of Malaysia was established in 1986 but only registered with the Elections Commission in 2003.^{D} Originally registered as the Parti Demokratik Setiahati Kuasa Rakyat Bersatu Sabah, it was later renamed on 23 March 2011 when it extended its wings to Peninsular Malaysia.^{E} Formed by former members of the original United Sabah National Organisation which was dissolved in 1991.^{F} The party applied to change its name to Minority Rights Action Party and announced its support for the Pakatan Harapan coalition prior to the GE14.^{G} The supposed plan to dissolve TERAS in 2016 was fully cancelled, and TERAS still continue to serve people and all community in Sarawak until now.

=== Parties registered with the ROS but not with the EC ===
Political parties registered with the Registrar of Societies (ROS) but not with the Election Commission (EC). They are therefore unable or able to contest in elections using their own symbols.

Party	Abbr	Leader	Ideology	Position	Registered	International affiliation	Notes
Malaysian Indian United Party; Parti Bersatu India Malaysia	MIUP	S. Nallakaruppan	N/A	N/A	2007		
Kongres Keadilan India Malaysia; Malaysian Indian Justice Congress	KKIM	R. Shanmugam	Hindu nationalism Dravidian parties	Centre-right	2019		
Sabah Truth Party; Sabah Truth Party	KEBENARAN	Bentan Alamin	Suluk nationalism	Left-wing	2013		
People's Power Party (Malaysia); Parti Kuasa Rakyat	Kuasa Rakyat	Kamaruzaman Yaakob	Marhaenism; Nationalism	Centre-left	2022		
Perikatan Dayak Bersatu; United Dayak Alliance	DAYAK BERSATU	Peter John Jaban	Dayak nationalism Social democracy Self-determination	Centre to centre-left	2026		
Parti Ekonomi Rakyat Sarawak Bersatu; United Sarawak People's Economy Party	PERSB	N/A	Sarawak regionalism	N/A	2013		
Malaysian Indian Justice Party; Parti Keadilan India Malaysia	MIJP	V. Arikrishna	Hindu nationalism Dravidianism	Centre-right	2013		
People's National Party of Malaysia; Parti Nasional Penduduk Malaysia	PNP	N/A	N/A	N/A	2013		
Parti Bersatu Bugis Sabah; Sabah Bugis United Party	PBBS	N/A	N/A	N/A	2013		

== Historical parties ==
These organisations have never been or are no longer registered as political bodies, and can thus no longer contest elections. Parties that were registered in British Malaya but operated solely in the territory of Singapore are also excluded from this list. Parties that have been renamed but still exist today as registered political parties are also excluded from this list. A number of these may still exist as organisations in some form, but none are recognised as political parties.

=== Before 1925 ===
Party	Abbr	Period	Description
Nanyang Communist Party; Parti Komunis Nanyang	CPN	1925–1930	South Seas Communist Party is also referred to as Nanyang Communist Party or simply called as SSCP or CPN which operates and is headquartered in Singapore. SSCP or CPN has been published since 1925, and on the instructions of the Comintern then uncle Ho Chi Minh was sent as a Comintern representative for the establishment of communist parties national to harmonize the culture of the local community with the ideology of communism, such as the Indochina Communist Party, Communist Party of Indonesia, Chinese Communist Party and Communist Party of Thailand.
Communist Party of Malaya; Parti Komunis Malaya	CPM	1930–1989	The party operated legally from 1945 to 1948 before it was banned. After it was banned, the party went underground as the Malayan National Liberation Army to conduct an armed rebellion. In 1989, the party signed a peace treaty with the Malaysian and Thai governments ending its armed rebellion. The current status of the party as an organisation remains unclear.
Young Malays Union; Kesatuan Melayu Muda	KMM	1937–1945	The first overtly political Malay national organisation. The party was dissolved after the surrender of Japan in 1945 but her members formed the nucleus of many post-war political parties.
Pahang Malays Association; Persatuan Melayu Pahang	PMP	1938–1949	The first overtly semi-political Malays national organisation in Pahang. The association was dissolved and absorbed into UMNO branches and it can be said that all the former leaders of the Pahang Malay Association continued their activities as UMNO leaders.
Syarikat Bekerjasama Am Saiburi; Saiburi General Cooperative Union	SABERKAS	1945–1954	Originally organised as an underground Malay nationalist movement in Thai occupied Kedah (Saiburi in Thai), it was legalised as a political organisation in 1945 just prior to the return of Kedah to the British authorities in 1946. It joined the Pan-Malayan Labour Party in 1952 and was eventually merged with the other component parties to form the Labour Party of Malaya in 1954.
Parti Kebangsaan Melayu Malaya; Malays Nationalist Party	PKMM	1945–1948	The first post-war pan-Malayan Malay nationalist party formed by former activists of the Young Malays Union advocating a form of left-wing nationalism called Marhaenism. The party was banned with the outbreak of the Malayan Emergency.
Malayan Democratic Union; Kesatuan Demokratik Malaya	MDU	1945–1948	The first post-war non-ethnic political party primarily but not exclusively operating in Singapore, an integral part of British Malaya then. The party was voluntarily dissolved after their failure to block the formation of the Federation of Malaya in favour of the Malayan Union and the outbreak of the Malayan Emergency.
All-Malaya Council of Joint Action	AMCJA	1946–1948	A coalition of left-wing non-Malay political parties in opposition to the Federation of Malaya proposal. The coalition worked in cooperation with the left-wing Malay dominated coalition, PUTERA. The coalition ceased to exist after the dissolution of MDU, the primary component party, in 1948.
Angkatan Pemuda Insaf; Aware Youth Corps	API	1946–1947	Originally the youth wing of the Malay Nationalist Party, the party was organised in 1946 by the more radical left-wing elements and was subsequently banned in 1947.
Angkatan Wanita Sedar; Awakened Women's Union	AWAS	1946–1948	Originally the women's wing of the Malay Nationalist Party, the party was organised in 1946 by the more radical left-wing elements and was banned with the outbreak of the Malayan Emergency.
Overseas Chinese Youth Association; Persatuan Pemuda Tionghua Perantauan Sarawak	OCYA	1946–1959	
New Democratic Youth League of Malaya; Liga Pemuda Demokratik Baru Malaya	NDYL	1946–1948	A member of the AMCJA, it was banned during the outbreak of the Malayan Emergency.
Pusat Tenaga Ra'ayat; Centre of Peoples' Power	PUTERA	1947–1948	A coalition of left-wing Malay political parties in opposition to the Federation of Malaya proposal. The coalition worked in cooperation with the left-wing non-Malay dominated coalition, AMCJA. The coalition ceased to exist after the banning of PKMM, the primary component party, in 1948.
Barisan Tani Se-Malaya; Pan-Malayan Farmers' Front	BATAS	1947–1948	A left-wing party for organising Malayan peasants. The party was banned with the outbreak of the Malayan Emergency and the party's leader, Musa Ahmad, eventually became the chairman of the Communist Party of Malaya.
Majlis Agama Tertinggi Se-Malaya; Pan-Malayan Supreme Religious Council	MATA	1947–1948	Established by radical Malay clerics to challenge the Sultan's control of Islam. It was part of the PUTERA coalition that worked with AMCJA in a multi-racial political front. It gradually adopted a more pan-Malay nationalist approach and eventually was absorbed by Hizbul Muslimin.
Gerakan Angkatan Muda; Young Generation Movement	GERAM	1947–1948	Led by Aziz Ishak and A Samad Ismail, it was part of the PUTERA coalition that worked with the AMCJA in a multi-racial political front. The movement was banned with the outbreak of the Malayan Emergency.
Pemuda Radikal Melayu; Radical Malay Youth Party	PERAM	1948	Established by Mohamed Mustaza, a former Secretary General of the PKMM, to replace the role played by API which was banned in 1947. PERAM was itself banned after the declaration of the Malayan Emergency.
Hizbul Muslimin; Malayan Muslim People's Party	HAMIM	1948	Inspired by the Muslim Brotherhood and led by Ustaz Abu Bakar al-Baqir, it was an attempt to transform MATA into a full-fledged political party. It ceased to exist after several of its leaders were arrested during the Malayan Emergency.
Malacca Labour Party; Parti Buruh Melaka	MLP	1948–1954	With government restrictions on forming a pan-Malayan labour party, this party was first organised within the territorial limits of Malacca in 1948 but only gained registration in 1951. In 1952, it joined the Pan-Malayan Labour Party and eventually merged with other state labour parties to form the Labour Party of Malaya in 1954.
Peninsular Malays Union; Persatuan Melayu Semenanjung	PEMAS	1949–1965	Formed as an alternative to UMNO for poorer Malays, the party were deregistered on the height of Indonesia-Malaysia confrontation

=== 1950–1959 ===
Party	Abbr	Period	Description
Sarawak Overseas Chinese Democratic Youth League; Liga Pemuda Tionghua Perantauan Demokratik Sarawak	SOCDYL	1951–1954	Radical left-wing offshoot of the Sarawak Overseas Chinese Youth Association. It was merged into the Sarawak Liberation League in 1954.
Radical Party; Parti Radikal	RP	1951–1952	Led by Lim Chong Eu, the party was founded to contest the George Town Municipal Council elections. The party was dissolved in 1952 when Lim joined the Malayan Chinese Association.
Alliance Party; Parti Perikatan		1951–1973	A coalition of the United Malays National Organisation, the Malayan Chinese Association and the Malayan Indian Congress. The coalition was expanded to include other parties after the 13 May Incident and was subsequently registered as the Barisan Nasional (National Front).
Independence of Malaya Party; Parti Kemerdekaan Malaya	IMP	1951–1953	Established by founding president of the United Malays National Organisation, Onn Jaafar, to be a multi-ethnic party. The party did not do well electorally and was dissolved in 1953.
Labour Party of Penang; Parti Buruh Pulau Pinang	LPP	1951–1954	With government restrictions on forming a pan-Malayan labour party, this party was organised within the territorial limits of Penang to contest the George Town Municipal Elections. In 1952, it joined the Pan-Malayan Labour Party and eventually merged with other state labour parties to form the Labour Party of Malaya in 1954.
Selangor Labour Party; Parti Buruh Selangor	SLP	1951–1954	With government restrictions on forming a pan-Malayan labour party, this party was organised within the territorial limits of Selangor. In 1952, it joined the Pan-Malayan Labour Party and eventually merged with other state labour parties to form the Labour Party of Malaya in 1954.
Perak Labour Party; Parti Buruh Perak	PLP	1952–1954	With government restrictions on forming a pan-Malayan labour party, this party was organised within the territorial limits of Perak. In 1952 it joined the Pan-Malayan Labour Party and eventually merged with other state labour parties to form the Labour Party of Malaya in 1954.
Negri Sembilan Labour Party; Parti Buruh Negri Sembilan	NSLP	1952–1954	With government restrictions on forming a pan-Malayan labour party, this party was organised within the territorial limits of Negri Sembilan to contest the Seremban Town Council elections in 1953. In 1952 it joined the Pan-Malayan Labour Party and eventually merged with other state labour parties to form the Labour Party of Malaya in 1954.
Pan-Malayan Labour Party; Parti Buruh Se-Malaya	PMLP	1952–1954	With government restrictions on forming a pan-Malayan labour party, the Pan-Malayan Labour Party was formed as a confederation of labour parties from Penang, Perak, Selangor, Negri Sembilan, Malacca and Singapore. With the loosening of regulations, it eventually centralised its organisation to form the Labour Party of Malaya in 1954.
National Association of Perak; Parti Kebangsaan Perak	NAP	1953–1959	Formed and led by the first Menteri Besar of Perak, Abdul Wahab Toh Muda Abdul Aziz, the party was a multi-ethnic party that cooperated with the Independence of Malaya Party and later with Parti Negara. The party was renamed the Perak National Democratic Association and eventually absorbed by the United Malays National Organisation and the Malayan Chinese Association after the death of the founder.
Province Wellesley Labour Party; Parti Buruh Seberang Prai	PWLP	1953–1959	With government restrictions on forming a pan-Malayan labour party, this party was organised within the territorial limits of Penang and competed against the Labour Party of Penang in the George Town Municipal Council elections in 1953. The party did not join the Pan-Malayan Labour Party and existed separately until its eventual merger with the LPM.
Parti Negara; National Party	PN	1953–1962	The successor party to the Independence of Malaya Party, it took a more Malay nationalistic stance compared to its predecessor but maintained a multi-ethnic composition. The party was dissolved after the death of its founding president, Onn Jaafar.
Malaysia People's Progressive Party; Parti Progresif Penduduk Malaysia	myPPP	1953–2019	A multiracial political party in Malaysia which was one of the component members of the National Front or Barisan Nasional (BN) coalition from 1973 to 2018. After losing the 2018 election, the party has been split into two factions – one led by Maglin Dennis D'Cruz who supported myPPP remaining part of the BN coalition and the other led by party president M. Kayveas who insisted on myPPP leaving the BN coalition. The latter emerged victorious in the immediate power struggle and myPPP subsequently exited the Barisan Nasional coalition. The Registrar of Societies (RoS) has deregistered MyPPP, which is facing leadership problems, effective 14 Jan 2019.
Labour Party of Malaya; Parti Buruh Malaya	LPM	1954–1972	With the easing of restrictions, the Pan-Malayan Labour Party re-organised itself from a confederation of labour parties into a centralised party.
Sarawak Liberation League; Liga Pembebasan Sarawak	SLL	1954–1956	A radical left-wing political organisation in Sarawak, it was merged into the Sarawak Advanced Youth Association in 1956 after being proscribed by the colonial authorities.
Sarawak Advanced Youth Association; Persatuan Pemuda Progresif Sarawak	SAYA	1956–1971	A militant left-wing political organisation in Sarawak, it eventually coalesced with other radical left-wing groups and formed the nucleus of the North Kalimantan Communist Party.
Malayan Socialist Youth League; Liga Pemuda Sosialis Malaya	MSYL	1956–1958	Organised as the youth wing of the Labour Party of Malaya, it was eventually proscribed and banned shortly after the independence of Malaya.
Malayan Party; Parti Malaya	MP	1956–1964	A Malacca based party, it was established to retain Malacca's status as a Crown Colony. With the formation of Malaysia in 1963, most members defected to the Alliance Party and the party eventually faded out.
Malayan Peoples' Socialist Front; Fron Sosialis Rakyat Malaya	FSRM	1957–1969	A coalition initially comprising the Labour Party of Malaya and Partai Ra'ayat, it became the major Opposition party in the newly independent Malaya until the Confrontation resulted in its persecution and eventual demise.

=== 1960–1969 ===
Party	Abbr	Period	Description
Parti Negara Sarawak; National Party of Sarawak	PANAS	1960–1968	A bumiputera dominated multi-ethnic political party, it was second political party to registered in Sarawak, it was established to contest municipal and district council elections. In 1968 the party merged with the Barisan Rakyat Jati Sarawak to form Parti Bumiputera.
United National Kadazan Organisation; Pertubuhan Kebangsaan Kadazan Bersatu	UNKO	1961–1964	Established by Donald Stephens, the first indigenous party in Sabah was modeled after UMNO in Malaya to represent the interests of the Kadazandusun community. The party split in 1962 with a group led by G. S. Sundang going on to form the United Pasok Momogun Organisation.
United Sabah National Organisation; Pertubuhan Kebangsaan Sabah Bersatu	USNO	1961–1996	Established by Mustapha Harun, it was established as a multi-ethnic party but was dominated by the Muslim Bajau community. The party was eventually dissolved in 1996 with her members either joining UMNO or Parti Bersatu Sabah after the dissolution.
Barisan Rakyat Jati Sarawak; Sarawak Native People's Front	BARJASA	1961–1968	A Muslim bumiputera party primarily representing the interests of the ethnic Malay and Melanau community, it merged with Parti Negara Sarawak in 1968 to form Parti Bumiputera.
Sarawak National Party; Parti Kebangsaan Sarawak	SNAP	1961–2013	A multi-ethnic party, it joined the Sarawak Alliance but was expelled in 1965. It joined the Barisan Nasional coalition in 1976 but was again expelled in 2004. It then joined the Pakatan Rakyat coalition in 2010 but withdrew just before the 2011 Sarawak state election. Various internal power struggles culminated in the de-registration of the party in 2013.
North Borneo Democratic Party; Parti Demokratik Borneo Utara	NBDP	1962	A Chinese-based party that was established in Jesselton, it merged later that same year with the Sandakan based United Party to form the Borneo Utara National Party (later renamed the Sabah National Party).
United Party; Parti Bersatu	UP	1962	A Chinese-based party that was established in Sandakan, it merged later that same year with the Jesselton based North Borneo Democratic Party to form the Borneo Utara National Party (later renamed the Sabah National Party).
United Pasok Momogun National Organisation; Persatuan Kebangsaan Pasok Momogun Bersatu	Pasok Momogun / UPMO	1962–1964	A breakaway from the United National Kadazan Organisation, it eventually reunited with its parent party to form the United Pasokmomogun Kadazan Organisation and formed the Sabah Alliance with the United Sabah National Organisation and the Sabah National Party.
Borneo Utara National Party; Parti Kebangsaan Borneo Utara	BUNAP	1962–1963	A merger of the North Borneo Democratic Party and the United Party, it was renamed the Sabah National Party after the independence of Sabah within the federation of Malaysia.
Sarawak Chinese Association; Persatuan Cina Sarawak	SCA	1962–1974	A Chinese-based party set up by former Parti Negara Sarawak, it was part of the Sarawak Alliance. In 1970, most of its members crossed over to the Sarawak United Peoples' Party. SCA fell into inactivity and was wounded up by its remnant members.
Parti Pesaka Anak Sarawak; Sarawak Native's Heritage Party	PESAKA	1962–1973	A party established by Tun Jugah to represent Iban interests, it was in direct competition with the Sarawak National Party. It merged with Parti Bumiputera in 1973 to form the Parti Pesaka Bumiputera Bersatu.
United Democratic Party; Parti Demokratik Bersatu	UDP	1962–1968	Established by Lim Chong Eu, a former president of the Malayan Chinese Association, it won a single seat in the 1964 general election. It was dissolved in 1968 when Lim joined forces with a few other notable politicians to form Parti Gerakan Rakyat Malaysia.
Sabah Indian Congress; Kongres India Sabah	SIC	1962–1975	A small party representing the interests of the Indian community in Sabah, it was part of the Sabah Alliance and held one of the nominated seats in the Sabah State Assembly until 1974 when the State Government fell to Parti Bersatu Rakyat Jelata Sabah. It subsequently ceased being active.
Sabah National Party; Parti Kebangsaan Sabah	SANAP	1963–1965	Formerly the Borneo Utara National Party, it was renamed the Sabah National Party after the independence of Sabah within the federation of Malaysia. In 1965, it absorbed the social organisation, the Sabah Chinese Association, and renamed itself as the latter.
National Convention Party; Parti Perhimpunan Kebangsaan	NCP	1963–1965	Established by Abdul Aziz Ishak, a former Federal Minister in Tunku Abdul Rahman's first and second administration, the party was a component of the Malayan Peoples' Socialist Front. It was weakened after the arrest of Aziz under the Internal Security Act in 1964 and subsequently dissolved.
United Pasokmomogun Kadazan Organisation; Persatuan Pasaokmomogun Kadazan Bersatu	UPKO	1964–1967	A merger of the United Kadazan National Organisation and the United Pasok Momogun National Organisation, it formed the Sabah Alliance with the United Sabah National Organisation and the Sabah National Party. By 1967, the party was absorbed the United Sabah National Organisation and had ceased to exist as an organised force.
Machinda Party; Parti Machinda	MACHINDA	1964–1967	Formed by dissidents of the Sarawak United Peoples' Party who were discomforted by the increasing communist influence and led by Michael Buma, the party participated in the Malaysian Solidarity Convention. Internal conflict over the participation of the party in the MSC eventually caused the party's dissolution in 1967
Sabah Chinese Association; Persatuan Cina Sabah	SCA	1965–1979	Renamed from the Sabah National Party after absorbing the smaller non-political Sabah Chinese Association, it was part of the Sabah Alliance until it left in 1976. In 1978, most of its leaders and members have left to form the Sabah Chinese Consolidated Party and the party was eventually deregistered in 1979.
Malaysian Solidarity Convention; Konvensyen Solidariti Malaysia	MSC	1965	A coalition led by the People's Action Party of Malaya consisting also of the United Democratic Party, the People's Progressive Party, the Sarawak United Peoples' Party and the Machinda Party to challenge what they perceived as the growth of communalism in Malaysia. The MSC was short-lived as PAP, the main convenor, was de-registered following the withdrawal of Singapore from Malaysia.
United Malaysian Chinese Organisation; Persatuan Cina Malaysia Bersatu	UMCO	1966–1970	Formed by former founding member of the Malayan Chinese Association and founding Secretary General of the United Democratic Party, Chin See Yin, the party failed to obtain electoral support in the 1969 general election and was dissolved in the aftermath of the 13 May Incident.
Parti Bumiputera; Bumiputera Party	PB	1967–1973	A merger of the Parti Negara Sarawak and Barisan Rakyat Jati Sarawak, the party eventually merged with Parti Pesaka Anak Sarawak to form Parti Pesaka Bumiputera Bersatu in 1973.
Parti Marhaen Malaysia; Malaysian Marhaen Party	PMM	1968–1974	Formed after the release of Parti Rakyat Malaysia founder, Ahmad Boestamam, the party was a result of Boestamam's disagreement with his former party's adoption of scientific socialism as its ideology. After the failure of the party to win electoral support in the 1974 general election, it merged with Parti Keadilan Masyarakat Malaysia.

=== 1970–1979 ===
Party	Abbr	Period	Description
United Sabah Action Party; Parti Tindakan Sabah Bersatu	USAP	1970–1974	Formed by former United Pasokmomogun Kadazan Organisation youth leader, Kalakau Untol, the party was short lived and dissolved after Kulakau joined Parti Keadilan Masyarakat Malaysia in 1974.
North Kalimantan Communist Party; Parti Komunis Kalimantan Utara	NKCP	1971–1990	Formally established with the consolidation of activist and guerilla forces operating previously as the Sarawak Advanced Youth Association, communist elements of the Sarawak United Peoples' Party, the Sarawak Peoples' Guerilla Force, and the North Kalimantan Peoples' Army. The NKCP fought a low intensity insurgency against the Malaysian government until a peace agreement was signed in 1990.
Parti Keadilan Masyarakat Malaysia; Malaysian Social Justice Party	PEKEMAS	1972–1982	Established by dissidents of Parti Gerakan Rakyat Malaysia after the party joined Barisan Nasional, the party contested in the 1974, 1978, and 1982 general elections. The party did not manage to win much electoral support and lost members to Parti Sosialis Rakyat Malaysia and the Democratic Action Party. After its failure to win any seats in the 1982 general election, the party was eventually dissolved.
Communist Party of Malaya (Revolutionary Faction); Parti Komunis Malaya (Puak Revolusioner)	CPM–RF	1973–1983	Established after a party purge by the North Malayan Bureau the Communist Party of Malaya when the 8th Regiment in Sadao broke from the main party. It merged with the Communist Party of Malaya (Marxist-Leninist) in 1983 to form the Communist Party of Malaysia.
Communist Party of Malaya (Marxist-Leninist); Parti Komunis Malaya (Marxis-Leninis)	CPM–ML	1974–1983	Established after a party purge by the North Malayan Bureau of the Communist Party of Malaya when the 2nd district of the 12th Regiment broke from the main party. It merged with the Communist Party of Malaya (Revolutionary Faction) in 1983 to form the Communist Party of Malaysia.
Parti Bisamah Sarawak; Sarawak Unity Party	BISAMAH	1974–1978	Founded by former SNAP activist, Nelson Kundai Ngareng, the party was renamed Parti Umat Sarawak (Sarawak People's Party) in 1977. It contested the 1978 general election but failed to win any seats and was dissolved shortly thereafter.
Independent People's Progressive Party; Parti Progresif Penduduk Bebas	IPPP	1974–1976	Established by dissidents of the People's Progressive Party after the party joined Barisan Nasional, the party contested in the 1974 general election but failed to gain any seats. The party became defunct shortly thereafter.
Kesatuan Insaf Tanah Air; Homeland Awareness Union	KITA	1974–1979	A multi-ethnic party by erstwhile members of Parti Gerakan Rakyat Malaysia and the PAS who disagreed with the decision of their former parties to join Barisan Nasional. The party was led by former PAS MP, Hashim Gera, and contested the 1974 and 1978 general elections. Having failed to gain electoral support, the party dissolved shortly their 1978 outing.
Parti Negara Rakyat Sarawak; Sarawak Peoples' National Party	NEGARA	1974–1999	A small Sarawak based political party that was originally rumoured to have been funded by the Parti Pesaka Bumiputera Bersatu to split the Opposition votes. It put up a strong challenge in the 1991 Sarawak state election together with Parti Bansa Dayak Sarawak on a campaign promise to appoint a Dayak Chief Minister but was badly defeated.
Parti Bersatu Rakyat Jelata Sabah; Sabah People's United Front	BERJAYA	1976–1991	Set up by the first Chief Minister of Sabah, Donald Stephens, and USNO Secretary-General, Harris Salleh, the party challenged USNO's dominance of Sabah politics and successfully won the 1976 Sabah state election. The party formed the state government for two terms before losing the 1985 election to Parti Bersatu Sabah. In 1991, the party together with USNO merged to form the Sabah chapter of the United Malays National Organisation.
Parti Perhimpunan Sabah Bersatu; United Sabah Assembly Party	PUSAKA	1977–1978	A short lived party established by Kalakau Untol, the party was dissolved when Kalakau joined Parti Bersatu Rakyat Jelata Sabah.
Sarawak People's Organisation; Pertubuhan Rakyat Sarawak	SAPO	1978–1982	Formed by former SNAP Miri branch secretary, Raymond Szetu Mei Thong to protest the party's entry in to Barisan Nasional in 1976. The party won a seat in the 1978 general election but lost it in the following term. The party then ceased to exist as an organised force thereafter.
Social Democratic Party; Parti Sosial Demokratik	SDP	1978–1986	Established by dissidents of the Democratic Action Party and led by Yeap Ghim Guan, the party was unable to gain electoral support and re-united with the parent party in 1986.
Parti Anak Jati Sarawak; Sarawak Native's Party	PAJAR	1978–1982	Established by dissidents of the Parti Pesaka Bumiputera Bersatu led by Alli Kawi, it emerged as a major contender in Sarawak and fielded many candidates in the 1978 Sarawak election but faded away after a poor electoral showing.
Parti Sarawak Demokratik Bersatu; Sarawak United Democratic Party	SUDP / BERSATU	1978–1988	Contested in both the 1983 and 1987 Sarawak elections but faded away after a poor electoral showing in both elections.
United Pasok Nunukragang National Organisation; Pertubuhan Kebangsaan Pasok Nunukragang Bersatu	PASOK	1978–2008	Set up by former Sabah Deputy Chief Minister G. S. Sundang, the party did not see much electoral success but have nurtured many politicians in its ranks that eventually gained prominency in Sabah. The party was de-registered in 2008 after failing to resolve a leadership crisis.

=== 1980–1989 ===
Party	Abbr	Period	Description
Sabah Chinese Consolidated Party; Parti Cina Bersatu Sabah	SCCP	1980–1990	A breakaway from Sabah Chinese Association after the party's poor showing in the 1976 state election. In 1989, its leaders abandoned the party and crossed over to the newly formed Liberal Democratic Party.
Malaysian Communist Party; Parti Komunis Malaysia	MCP	1983–1988	Formed on 5 December 1983 through the merger of two Communist Party of Malaya splinter groups; the Communist Party of Malaya/Revolutionary Faction and the Communist Party of Malaya/Marxist-Leninist. Conducted armed struggle in the Malaysian-Thai border areas between 1983 and 1987. It eventually accepted a deal for cessation of hostilities with the Thai military and its cadres were resettled in 'friendship villages'.
Parti Hizbul Muslimin Malaysia; Muslim People's Party of Malaysia	HAMIM	1983–1998	Formed by the former president of the PAS, Asri Muda, it joined Barisan Nasional and was part of the ruling coalition of the state of Kelantan until the state fell to PAS again in 1990. The party's last electoral foray was in 1995 after which it eventually fell into inactivity and later de-registered.
Parti Bansa Dayak Sarawak; Sarawak Native People's Party	PBDS	1983–2004	Formed by Leo Moggie Irok after a failed attempt to win the presidency of the Sarawak National Party, it was the main representative of the Dayak community in Barisan Nasional until its splintering and subsequent de-registration in 2004.
Sarawak United Labour Party; Kongres Buruh Bersatu Sarawak	PLUS	1983–1991	A small Sibu based political party, it contested both the 1986 and 1990 general elections but failed to win any representation. It disbanded shortly thereafter.
Parti Bersatu Rakyat Bumiputera Sabah; Sabah United Bumiputera People's Party	BERSEPADU	1984–?	Founded by former Sabah state minister Rauf Othman who was expelled from BERJAYA and then joined but left USNO. It contested in the 1985 Sabah state election but failed to capture any seats.
Parti Nasionalis Malaysia; Malaysian Nationalist Party	NASMA	1985–1989	The first Malay majority multi-racial party in the Peninsular since Parti Negara, it was embroiled in a leadership tussle within the first year, which triggered mass resignations. Entering the 1986 general Election in a weakened state, it did not capture any seat and faded away shortly after.
Parti Momogun Kebangsaan Malaysia; Malaysian National Momogun Party	MOMOGUN	1985–?	A Sabah-based party that contested only in the 1986 general election, it later changed its name to Parti Momogun Kebangsaan Sabah (Sabah National Momogun Party). Momogun has since become dormant.
Democratic Malaysian Indian Party; Parti Demokratik India Malaysia	DMIP	1985–1997	A breakaway from the Malaysian Indian Congress led by a former Vice-President of the party, V. Govindaraj. After a ten-year effort to join Barisan Nasional ended in failure, the party was dissolved a Govindaraj returned to his original party.
Sabah Chinese Party; Parti Cina Sabah	PCS	1986	Set up by former Parti Bersatu Sabah State Assembly Member Francis Leong, it applied to join Barisan Nasional but was turned down. A few months after registration, PCS proposed to merge with Sabah Chinese Consolidated Party, with the latter declining the offer, and the party was subsequently dissolved.
Malaysian Solidarity Party; Parti Solidariti Malaysia	PCS	1986–1990	Set up by former Malaysian Chinese Association Secretary-General, Yeoh Poh San, the party was part of the Gagasan Rakyat coalition but dissolved after the resignation of Yeoh and other Committee members after the 1990 general election.
Harakah Keadilan Rakyat; People's Justice Movement	HAK	1986	A coalition composed of the Pan-Malaysian Islamic Party, Parti Rakyat Malaysia, Parti Nasionalis Malaysia, and the Social Democratic Party set up to contest the 1986 general election against Barisan Nasional.
Persatuan Rakyat Malaysia Sarawak; Sarawak Malaysian People's Association	PERMAS	1987–1991	Formed in the aftermath of the 1987 Ming Court Affair by dissidents against the Chief Minister of Sarawak, Abdul Taib Mahmud, the party managed to win a total of 20 seats with its ally, Parti Bansa Dayak Sarawak in the 1987 Sarawak election but was unable to unseat the Barisan Nasional. It failed to retain any of its seats in the 1991 election and the party dissolved shortly thereafter.
Community Coalition Congress; Kongres Penyatuan Masyarakat	CCC	1988–2010	Established as the Chinese Concultative Council of the Pan-Malaysian Islamic Party to face the 1986 general election, it was formally registered as a political party in 1988. It did not participate directly in any general election and was subsequently superseded by PAS Supporters' Assembly, an official wing of the larger party.
Parti Melayu Semangat 46; Spirit of 46 Malay Party	S46	1989–1996	Formed by the losing faction in UMNO's contentious party elections in 1987, it was led by Tengku Razaleigh Hamzah. It was part of the Gagasan Rakyat and Angkatan Perpaduan Ummah coalitions that contested the 1990 general election. By the mid 1990s it had grown severely weakened and in 1996 the party was dissolved when Razaleigh returned to UMNO.
Parti Rakyat Sabah; Sabah People's Party	PRS	1989–1991	Founded by former BERJAYA leader James Ongkili to challenge and defeat the then-dominant Parti Bersatu Sabah in Sabah but he ultimately left the party to join PBS which was led by his uncle, Joseph Pairin Kitingan.
Angkatan Keadilan Rakyat; People's Justice Front	AKAR	1989–2001	Founded by a splinter of Parti Bersatu Sabah headed by Mark Koding, it joined Barisan Nasional in 1991. In 1998, it amended its name to Angkatan Keadilan Rakyat Bersatu (United People's Justice Front). In 1996, a leadership tussle between its top two leaders Pandikar Amin Mulia and Jeffrey Kitingan led to the latter returning to PBS with a large group. Eventually, Pandikar and party remnants decided to dissolve the party and join UMNO.
Gagasan Rakyat; People's Might	GR	1989–1996	A coalition comprising the Democratic Action Party, Parti Melayu Semangat 46, Parti Rakyat Malaysia, Parti Bersatu Sabah, and the All Malaysian Indian Progressive Front to contest the 1990 general election. Disputes between the DAP and S46 eventually caused the coalition to fall apart and the coalition was dissolved after a poor showing in the 1995 general election.
Angkatan Perpaduan Ummah; Muslim Unity Movement	APU	1989–1996	A coalition comprising the Parti Melayu Semangat 46, PAS, BERJASA, and the Parti Hizbul Muslimin Malaysia to contest the 1990 general election. It won control of the Kelantan state government but was formally disbanded after 1995 general election.
Kongres Rakyat Malaysia; Malaysian People Congress	KRM	1986–?	Never contested in any general election
Malaysian Unity Movement; Parti Perpaduan Anak Malaysia	MUM	1986–?	Never contested in any general election
Parti Perpaduan Masyarakat; Community Unity Party	PPM	1989–?	Never contested in any general election
Parti Merdeka Malaysia; Malaysian Independence Party	PMM	1989–?	Never contested in any general election

=== 1990–1999 ===
Party	Abbr	Period	Description
United Action Party; Parti Tindakan Bersatu	UAP	1990–?	A small ethnic Chinese based party in Sabah.
Parti Kesejahteraan Insan Tanah Air; Homeland People's Wellbeing Party	KITA	1995 (2011)-2012	Originally registered as Angkatan Keadilan Insan Malaysia or AKIM (Malaysian People's Justice Front), it was later renamed on 13 December 2010 by its new chairman, Zaid Ibrahim.
Malaysian Democratic Party; Parti Demokratik Malaysia	MDP	1998–2008	Established by Democratic Action Party dissidents, Wee Choo Keong and Yeap Ghim Guan, the party contested the 1999 and 2004 elections but failed to win any seat. In 2008, Wee joined Parti Keadilan Rakyat and the party was dissolved.
Barisan Rakyat Sabah Bersekutu; Federated Sabah People's Front	BERSEKUTU	1998–2010	Established by former Sabah Chief Minister, Harris Salleh, the party contested the 1999 general election but failed to win any seats. In 2010, the party was dissolved and Harris went on to form the Sabah People's Front.
Barisan Alternatif; Alternative Front	BA	1998–2004	A coalition formed between the KeADILan, DAP, PAS, and PRM, it contested the 1999 and 2004 elections. Tensions between DAP and PAS caused the pact to fragment and by 2004, it had ceased to exist.
Angkatan Insaf Rakyat; Conscious People's Movement	AIR	1999	A coalition formed by splinter parties and groups of PAS and led by AKIM, it consisted of AKIM, HAMIM, BERJASA, and two other smaller groups.
Parti Reformasi Insan Malaysia; Malaysian People's Reform Party	PRIM	1999–2009	Founded by P. Uthayakumar after he left Parti Keadilan Nasional in 1999, the party failed to obtain registration. PRIM activists formed the core of the HINDRAF. HINDRAF was banned in 2007 and its leaders, including Uthayakumar was arrested under the Internal Security Act. Upon Uthayakumar's release, he formed the Human Rights Party.

=== 2000–2009 ===
Party	Abbr	Period	Description
Malaysian Dayak Congress; Kongres Dayak Malaysia	MDC	2005–2013	Formed by supporters of Daniel Tajem who fought Dr James Masing in a bitter power struggle in Parti Bansa Dayak Sarawak in 2003–2004. This resulted in the de-registration of PBDS with Masing's supporters forming Parti Rakyat Sarawak. MDC however failed to obtain registration and her key leaders contested subsequent elections as independents or representatives of other parties like Parti Keadilan Rakyat. In 2013, one group managed to successfully register Parti Bansa Dayak Sarawak Baru.
Malaysian Indian Democratic Action Front; Barisan Bertindak Demokratik India Malaysia	MINDRAF	2005–2009	Formed by a veteran journalist Manuel Lopez to consolidate the objectives of the HINDRAF into a political movement, it failed to obtain registration and was hampered by the arrest of four major HINDRAF activists under the Internal Security Act. In 2009, the released detainees and party activists had formed the Human Rights Party instead.
Parti Mahasiswa Negara; National Students' Party	PMN	2008	A multi-ethnic political party led by activists of the PAS friendly All Malaysia Muslim Undergraduates Movement (Gabungan Mahasiswa Islam Se-Malaysia) and supported by activists of the National Undergraduates Action Front (Barisan Bertindak Mahasiswa Negara), and Malaysian Students Solidarity (Solidariti Mahasiswa Malaysia), it failed to obtain registration as it was deemed to be against the provisions of the Universities and University Colleges Act 1971 that forbade students from active participation in politics.
Pakatan Rakyat; People's Pact	PR	2008 -2015	A coalition between PKR, the DAP, the PAS and the SNAP that was formed after the 2008 general election. It failed to obtain registration but continued to operate as an electoral pact in the 2013 general election. In 2015, tensions between the DAP and PAS caused the coalition to fracture with PKR, DAP and the new PAS splinter party, AMANAH forming a new coalition called Pakatan Harapan while PAS went on to form its own coalition called Gagasan Sejahtera.
Human Rights Party Malaysia; Parti Hak Asasi Manusia Malaysia	HRP	2009–2019	A multi-ethnic political party led by human rights and equal rights activist P. Uthayakumar HRP registration application however was never approved and it is being considered as disbanded in due course as even the original movement it was based, HINDRAF had been deregistered in 2019.

=== 2010 – present ===
Party	Abbr	Period	Description
Sabah People's Front; Barisan Bersatu Sabah	SPF	2010–2012	A splinter party of the Federated Sabah People's Front. However, in 2012, SPF was taken over by some former Sarawak Peoples' Party (PRS) members led by dissident leader Sng Chee Hua and turned into the new Sarawak Workers Party (SWP). Meanwhile, the party former president Berman Angkap formed and became the president of new Sabah Peace Party (SPP) in 2013.
Parti Sarawak Bersatu; United Sarawak Party	PSB	2014–2024	The PSB was actually a splinter party of Sarawak United People's Party (SUPP) set-up by the Second Finance Minister for Sarawak, Wong Soon Koh along with his supporters following a leadership tussle of the party then and it started as a pro-Barisan Nasional (BN) political pact

== See also ==
- Politics of Malaysia
- List of political parties by country
- List of Malaysian electoral districts
- List of the winning political parties in the Malaysian general election by parliamentary constituency
