= Malaysian Ceylonese Congress =

- Malay name: Kongres Ceylonese Malaysia كوڠݢريس سيلونيس مليسيا
- Tamil name: மலேசிய சிலோனீஸ் காங்கிரஸ் Malēciya Cilōṉīs Kāṅkiras
- Sinhalese name: මැලේසියානු ලංකා කොන්ග්‍රසය; Mælēsiyānu Laṁkā Kongrasaya
- Abbreviation: MCC
- President: Mahendranathan Thuraiappah
- Secretary-General: Vijayaletsumi Tharuman
- Deputy President: Parameswaran Kasippilai
- Vice President: Rajeswari Kandiah
- Vice President: Sivamalar Subramaniam
- Vice President: Kantha Rasalingam
- Women's Chief: Rasamani Kandiah
- Founder: M. W. Navaratnam
- Founded: 1958
- Preceded by: Selangor State Ceylonese Association (1900-1958); Malayan Ceylonese Congress (1958-1970); Malaysian Ceylonese Congress (since 1971)
- Headquarters: No.75-3A-1, Jalan Metro Perdana Barat 1, Taman Usahawan, Kepong Utara, 52100 Kuala Lumpur
- Dewan Negara: 0 / 70
- Dewan Rakyat: 0 / 222
- Dewan Undangan Negeri: 0 / 587

Website
- Official website

The Malaysian Ceylonese Congress (MCC; Malay: Kongres Ceylonese Malaysia, Tamil: மலேசிய சிலோனீஸ் காங்கிரஸ், Sinhala: මැලේසියානු ලංකා කොන්ග්‍රසය) is a political party in Malaysia.

== Formation ==
Formed earlier in 1958 as Malayan Ceylonese Congress before it changed its name to Malaysian Ceylonese Congress in 1970, the MCC was established as a political party. MCC was initially originated from Selangor Ceylonese Association or Persatuan Ceylon Selangor founded in 1900, when the meeting of its members under leadership of M.W. Navaratnam in January 1958 decided to transformed the association status to a political party by changing its name and constitution to Malayan Ceylonese Congress. The brainchild of M.W Navaratnam, MCC was formed to promote and preserve the Political, Educational, Social and Cultural aspects of the Malaysians of Ceylonese origin, or Sri Lankan descent.

MCC was hoping to join the Barisan Nasional (BN) and its predecessor Alliance coalition since the independence in 1957 despite debates that the Malaysian Ceylonese community should join the Malaysian Indian Congress (MIC), one of BN's major component party for the Malaysian Indians instead. MCC used to have a Senator in the Dewan Negara; the Upper House of Parliament of Malaysia until 1981.

Before the 2018 general election (GE14) which saw the fall of BN ruling government, MCC indirectly had been supporting the BN coalition and was considered to be pro-BN. MCC was inclined to BN when the coalition was in power and had received aid from the BN ruling government then.

== President ==
To date, seven presidents have held office since 1958.

- 1) M. W. Navaratnam (1958–1969)
- 2) C. Sinnadurai (1970–1983)
- 3) Tan Sri V. Jeyaratnam (1983–1987)
- 4) N. Arumugasamy (1988–1995)
- 5) Prof. Datuk Dr D.M. Thuraiappah (1996-2003)
- 6) NKS Tharmaseelan (2004–2017)
- 7) Mahendranathan Thuraiappah (2018-)

== See also ==
- List of political parties in Malaysia
- Politics of Malaysia
- Barisan Nasional
- Sri Lankan Tamil diaspora
