= Parti Sejahtera Angkatan Perpaduan Sabah =

Political party of Malaysia

Sabah Wellbeing & Unity Front Party Parti Sejahtera Angkatan Perpaduan Sabah SAPU
- Abbreviation: SAPU
- Leader: Abdul Banning Mohd
- Founded: 28 August 2013
- Ideology: Nationalism; Regionalism
- Colours: Orange

Party flag

Website
- Parti Sejahtera Angkatan Perpaduan Sabah on Facebook

Sabah Wellbeing & Unity Front Party or Malay: Parti Sejahtera Angkatan Perpaduan Sabah (SAPU) is a Sabah-based-opposition party in Malaysia formed and registration approved by the Registrar of Societies (RoS) to operate as a political party after the 2013 Malaysian general election. It was a component of the previously planned Gabungan Rakyat Saksama (SAKSAMA) coalition.

SAPU which was started to be founded in 2010 and officially registered in 2013, had revealed in 2016 that the Sabah-based party would be spread to national or federal level and rebranded as Parti Berjaya Sekata Malaysia (BERJAYA) with its new logo, flag and anthem.

== Logo and flag ==
The logo of the SAPU is a brain of human image being representing the positive thinking of the party. The official flag of the party is symbols of five stars in the middle of two crescent moons on the orange background.

== See also ==
- Politics of Malaysia
- List of political parties in Malaysia
