= Parti Bersatu Bugis Sabah =

Political party in Malaysia

Sabah Bugis United Party Parti Bersatu Bugis Sabah
- Abbreviation: PBBS
- Founded: 2013
- Headquarters: Kota Kinabalu, Sabah
- Ideology: Sabah regionalism
- Dewan Negara: 0 / 70
- Dewan Rakyat: 0 / 222
- Sabah State Legislative Assembly: 0 / 60

Website
- partibersatubugissabah.blogspot.com

The Sabah Bugis United Party (Malay: Parti Bersatu Bugis Sabah, abbrev: PBBS) is a political party in Malaysia that focuses on the welfare of Bugis people in Sabah. It was among the latest 20 new parties registration approved by the Registrar of Society (RoS) and received permission to operate as a political party in 2013.

== See also ==
- Politics of Malaysia
- List of political parties in Malaysia
