= Malaysian Unity Movement =

Malaysian Unity Movement Parti Perpaduan Anak Malaysia
- Abbreviation: MUM
- Founder: Arthur Lee
- Founded: 1 February 1986
- Legalised: 1 February 1986
- Split from: MCA
- Headquarters: Kuala Lumpur & Petaling Jaya, Malaysia
- Ideology: Multiracialism
- Political position: Left-wing
- Colours: Red
- Slogan: Chinese unity in national unity

Malaysian Unity Movement (abbrev: MUM; Malay: Parti Perpaduan Anak Malaysia) was a multiracial political party in Malaysia. Itsought to represent the Malaysian Chinese ethnicity and was formed by former MCA member, Arthur Lee.

== Platform ==
The party were formed with intention to encourage Chinese unity in attainment of national unity, nationalism, obeservance of Rukun Negara, and promote general welfare of Malaysian Chinese.

== See also ==
- Politics of Malaysia
- List of political parties in Malaysia
