= Sabah Truth Party =

Sabah Truth Party Parti Kebenaran Sabah KEBENARAN
- Abbreviation: KEBENARAN
- President: Bentan Alamin
- Founder: Bentan Alamin
- Founded: 2013
- Legalised: 2013
- Headquarters: Lot B-2-6 Blok B, 2nd Floor Plaza Tanjung Aru Jalan Mat Salleh Tanjung Aru, 88300 Kota Kinabalu, Sabah.
- Ideology: Suluk nationalism
- Colours: Blue, green, white
- Dewan Negara: 0 / 70
- Dewan Rakyat: 0 / 222
- Sabah State Legislative Assembly: 0 / 60

Website
- Sabah Truth Party (KEBENARAN) Facebook

The Sabah Truth Party or in Malay: Parti Kebenaran Sabah (KEBENARAN) is a political party based in Sabah, Malaysia mainly to serve as catalyst to be a Suluk community party. The Parti Kebenaran Sabah (KEBENARAN) claimed to be a Barisan Nasional (BN) friendly party. It is a relatively new party, was among the latest new parties registration approved by the Registrar of Society (RoS) and just received permission to operate as a political party in 2013.

== See also ==
- Politics of Malaysia
- List of political parties in Malaysia
