= Parti Merdeka Malaysia =

Malaysian Independence Party Parti Merdeka Malaysia PMM
- Abbreviation: PPM
- Founded: 1989
- Dissolved: Defunct

The Malaysian Independence Party (Malay: Parti Merdeka Malaysia, abbreviated PMM) was a political party in based in Malaysia representing established in 1989. It has never contested in any general election and became a dormant party.

== See also ==
- Politics of Malaysia
- List of political parties in Malaysia
