= Minority Rights Action Party =

- Malay name: Parti Tindakan Hak Minoriti ڤرتي تيندقن حق مينوريتي
- Tamil name: சிறுபான்மை உரிமை செயல் கட்சி
- Chinese name: 少數民族權利行動黨; Shǎoshù mínzú quánlì xíngdòng dǎng
- Abbreviation: MIRA
- President: Datuk A. Chandrakumanan
- Secretary-General: Kannan Ramasamy
- President: Datuk A. Candrakumanan
- Founder: Kannan Ramasamy and Late Francis Rhajahh
- Founded: 22 November 2018
- Headquarters: Klang
- Ideology: Liberal democracy Minority rights Centrism
- National affiliation: Friends of PN (since 2023) (Note: The party was aligned with Pakatan Harapan (2018) and Barisan Nasional (2020-2023))
- Colours: Red, white
- Dewan Negara: 0 / 70
- Dewan Rakyat: 0 / 222
- Dewan Undangan Negeri: 0 / 587

Website
- Official website

The Minority Rights Action Party or Malay: Parti Tindakan Hak Minoriti, abbreviated MIRA, is a political party in Malaysia. The party was an active party and was formed in 2017 by a group of human rights activist led by Kannan Ramasamy and educationist Late Francis Rhajahh. It was approved registration by the Registrar of Society in November 2018. MIRA Party was co-founded by Kannan Ramasamy and Late Francis Rhajahh. The party's aims is to be voice of minority in Malaysia and to establish policy for minorities along the UN Declaration on Minorities Right 1992.

Party being the first Indian Malaysian national bilingual and multi-racial party. It joined Perikatan Nasional as Friends of PN to represent Indian community and other minorities in Malaysia.

== History ==
Minority Rights Action Party was once accepted as strategic partner of Pakatan Harapan in February 2018 before the GE14. Since then, it took a more neutral stance and the government led by BN as friendly party.

On 19 December 2021, Kamarazaman Yaakob announced taking over Minority Rights Action Party (MIRA) and were named as president in order for it to be rebrand to Kuasa Rakyat. Months later, he were dropped from MINA presidency while waiting for Registrar of Society application on the rebrand.

On 4 August 2023, MIRA Party was officially appointed into Perikatan Nasional as Friends of PN under Fasal 5 of Perikatan Nasional by law. The ceremony was done at Hilton Double Tree Hotel I-city after the launch of PN Manifesto for Selangor. The certificate dated 17 July and appointment letter were given by PN Chairman Tan Sri Muhyiddin Yassin to Sec Gen Kannan Ramasamy and President Datuk A.Chandrakumanan.

== Leadership structure ==
- President:
  - Datuk A. Chandrakumanan
- Deputy President:
  - Datuk Krishnan
- Secretary General:
  - Kannan Ramasamy
- Treasurer General:
  - Karthigesu Karuppiah

== See also ==
- Politics of Malaysia
- List of political parties in Malaysia
