= Peninsular Malays Union =

Peninsular Malays Union Persatuan Melayu Semenanjung
- Abbreviation: PEMAS
- Founder: Hashim Ghani
- Founded: 17 December 1949
- Dissolved: 23 January 1965
- Headquarters: Kota Bharu, Malaysia
- Membership: 25,000 (1951)
- Ideology: Ketuanan Melayu; Malay nationalism National conservatism Social conservatism
- Political position: Right-wing
- Colours: Red
- Slogan: Malaya for the Malays

Peninsular Malays Union (PMU,PMS or PEMAS, Malay: Persatuan Melayu Semenanjung) was a Right-wing party formed by lawyer Hashim Ghani, a former member of Singapore Progressive Party (PP) and Malayan Party. It formed as an alternative to poorer section of Malays as opposed to aristocratic United Malays National Organization. The party were noted for being among the influential party in Singapore in campaigning for Muslim rights. The party were banned on the height of Indonesia-Malaysia confrontation in 1965.

== History ==
The party were formed to rival UMNO. It were formed on 17 September 1949 at Sultan Ismail Club. In response, UMNO bans its members from joining the party. The party took more hard stance by advocating Malaya for the Malays and Malays self-rule.

In early 1950's, the party leadership were tussled between Hashim Ghani and Ahmad Abdul Rahim. It were later sorted out with Ahmad Abdul Rahim acted as president.

The party were to contest 1959 Malayan general election with 80 candidates but failed to do so during nomination days.

The party intend to form a United Malay Front for 1964 Malaysian general election and compete for all seats. However this never materialized due to the party lack fund to contest.

At the height of Indonesia-Malaysia confrontation, several party members were detained under Internal Security Act. On 26 May 1964, party president, Ahmad Abdul Rahim were also detained as suspected to be affiliated with Indonesia and on anti-Malaysia campaign.

The party were later banned under the same reason.

== List of party leaders ==
President

#	Name	Took office	Left office	Remarks
1	Hashim Ghani	17 December 1949	19 May 1952	
2	Ahmad Abdul Rahim	8 March 1953	23 January 1965	

== See also ==
- Politics of Malaysia
- List of political parties in Malaysia
- United Malays National Organisation
