= Democratic Malaysian Indian Party =

Malaysian political party

Democratic Malaysian Indian Party Parti Demokratik India Malaysia Parti Demokratik India Malaysia
- Abbreviation: DMIP
- Leader: Datuk V. Govindaraj
- Founder: Datuk V. Govindaraj
- Founded: 19 October 1985
- Dissolved: 1997
- Split from: Malaysian Indian Congress (MIC)
- Headquarters: Kuala Lumpur

Democratic Malaysian Indian Party (DMIP) or Malay: Parti Demokratik India Malaysia was a splinter party of Malaysian Indian Congress (MIC) formed on 19 October 1985 to represent the minority India community by Datuk V. Govindaraj, an ex-Vice President of MIC. He joined MIC in 1946, selected to be Central Working Committee (CWC) member of MIC in 1978, elected as the Member of Parliament for Pelabuhan Klang in 1979, chief of Selangor MIC and central MIC Vice President in 1981 before his MIC membership was suspended in 1983 and sacked later in 1984 which push him to form and found Democratic Malaysian Indian Party (DMIP). Although the struggle of DMIP for than ten years has failed to join Barisan Nasional (BN) causing it to be disbanded by its founder and president, Datuk V. Govindaraj who went back to be with MIC and was selected again as CWC member of MIC in 1997 but was dropped at last by Datuk Seri S. Samy Vellu in 2006.

== See also ==
- Politics of Malaysia
- List of political parties in Malaysia
- Malaysian Indian Congress (MIC)
