= Parti Perpaduan Masyarakat =

Community Unity Party Parti Perpaduan Masyarakat PPM
- Abbreviation: PPM
- Founded: 1989
- Dissolved: Defunct

The Community Unity Party (Malay: Parti Perpaduan Masyarakat, abbreviated PPM) was a political party in based in Malaysia representing established in 1989. It has never contested in any general election and became a dormant party.

== See also ==
- Politics of Malaysia
- List of political parties in Malaysia
