= Community Coalition Congress =

Community Coalition Congress Kongres Penyatuan Masyarakat CCC
- Abbreviation: CCC
- President: Ong Boon
- Founded: 1988
- Headquarters: Kuala Lumpur
- National affiliation: Pan-Malaysian Islamic Party (PAS)
- Dewan Negara: 0 / 70
- Dewan Rakyat: 0 / 222
- Dewan Undangan Negeri: 0 / 587

Community Coalition Congress (CCC) or Malay: Kongres Penyatuan Masyarakat was formed and registered as a political party in 1988 to replace the Chinese Concultative Council (CCC) or Majlis Perundingan Cina wing formed by the Pan-Malaysian Islamic Party (PAS) in facing the Malaysian general election, 1986 to enable the space for the out-flow of supports of the Chinese community who are majority non-Muslim, but face the problem of internal opposition from the Islamic party and the reluctance to allow CCC supporters to be accepted and registered officially as party member, thus to represent PAS in the general election on its ticket.

Although CCC has been registered as a political party with the Registrar of Society (ROS), it has not contested in any general election up-to-date. CCC continue to be a passive party with the formation of Kelab Penyokong PAS (KPP) or PAS Supporters Club in facing the Malaysian general election, 2008 which was upgraded to Dewan Himpunan Penyokong PAS (DHPP) or PAS Supporters Assembly Hall as a new PAS party wing on 23 May 2010. In line with the goal of the new wing to spread the party's popularity among the non-Muslims, the wing is able to nominate non-Muslim candidates in the general elections.

== See also ==
- Politics of Malaysia
- List of political parties in Malaysia
