= Malaysian Indian Justice Party =

Malaysian Indian Justice Party Parti Keadilan India Malaysia மலேசிய இந்திய நீதிக் கட்சி
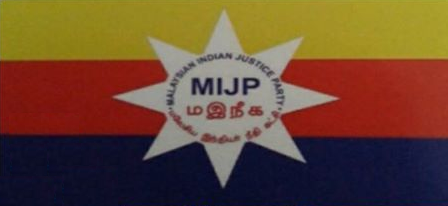
- Abbreviation: MIJP
- President: A.SriJeewanathan
- Secretary-General: R. Mookan
- Deputy president: Vingneswaran
- Vice-president: Parameswaran
- Founder: V. Arikrishna
- Founded: 2013
- Headquarters: Klang, Selangor, Malaysia
- Ideology: Hindu nationalism Dravidian parties
- Colours: Yellow, red, blue
- Dewan Negara: 0 / 70
- Dewan Rakyat: 0 / 222
- Sabah State Legislative Assembly: 0 / 60

Party flag
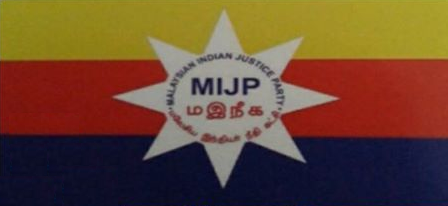

Website
- Malaysian Indian Justice Party on Facebook

Malaysian Indian Justice Party (Malay: Parti Keadilan India Malaysia, Tamil: மலேசிய இந்திய நீதிக் கட்சி, romanized: Malēciya intiya nītik kaṭci; abbrev: MIJP) is a political party representing the Indian community in Malaysia. It is a relatively new party, was among the latest 20 new parties registration approved by the Registrar of Society (RoS) and just received permission to operate as a political party in 2013. The party is pro-Barisan Nasional (BN) coalition party and even campaigned for BN in the 2018 Malaysian general election (GE14). The party is closely related to Ahmad Zahid Hamidi, BN Deputy Chairman then.

== See also ==
- Politics of Malaysia
- List of political parties in Malaysia
