= Societies Registration Act, 1860 =

British India legislation

Council of the Governor General of India
- Long title: An Act for the Registration of Literary, Scientific and Charitable Societies.
- Citation: Act No. 21 of 1860
- Passed by: Council of the Governor General of India
- Passed: 21 May 1860
- Commenced: 21 May 1860
- Status: In force

The Societies Registration Act, 1860 (Act No. 21 of 1860) is a legislation in British India which allows the registration of entities generally involved in the benefit of society – education, health, employment etc.

The British Indian Empire, with a wish to encourage such activities and to promote the formal organisation of groups of like minded people, incorporated the Act 21 of 1860, in other words, the Societies Registration Act, 1860 (21 of 1860), which came into force on 21 May 1860.

In post-independence India, the Act continues until today and being an Act of Parliament, comes under the Right to Information Act, wherein the government is legally responsible to give any information requested by any citizen of India with respect to any society.

In Bangladesh, Burma and Pakistan, all previously part of the British Raj, the Act also continues. In Brunei, Hong Kong, Malaysia and Singapore, similar legislations for the registration of societies are also in place.

== Background ==
The Societies Registration Act, 1860 was enacted under the British Raj in India, but is largely still in force in India today. It provides for the registration of literary, scientific and charitable societies.

Under the act societies may be formed, by way of a memorandum of association, by any seven or more people associated for any literary, scientific or charitable purpose. The memorandum of association has to be filed with the Registrar of Societies. The memorandum has to contain the name of the society, its objects, and the names, addresses, and occupations of the members of the governing body, by whatever name it may be called, duly signed for consent by all the members forming the society. A copy of the rules and regulations of the society also has to be filed along with the memorandum of association. A fee of rs. 50 is payable in cash, for registration.

== Closing of a registered society ==
A society is legally registered under the Societies Registration Act, 1860. The act was enacted under the British Raj in India, but is largely still in force in India today. It provides for the registration of literary, scientific and charitable societies. Under the act societies may be formed, by way of a memorandum of association, by any seven or more people associated for any literary, scientific or charitable purpose. The memorandum of association has to be filed with the Registrar of Societies. The memorandum has to contain the name of the society, its objects, and the names, addresses, and occupations of the members of the governing body, by whatever name it may be called, duly signed for consent by all the members forming the society.

=== Provisions under the act ===
Under Section 13 of the Societies Registration Act, 1860; a number of provisions relating to dissolution of a society and adjustments of its affairs are stated. It is stated that Any number not less than three-fifths of the members of any society may decide and determine that it shall be dissolved, and consequently it shall be dissolved without any delay, or at the time then agreed upon by the members, and all necessary steps are to be taken for the disposal and settlement of the property of the society, its claims and liabilities, according to the rules of the said society applicable thereto, if any were made at the time of the registration of the society and if not, then as the governing body shall find a convenient expedient, provided that, in the incident of any dispute or disagreement arising among the said governing body or the members of the society, the adjustment of its affairs shall be referred to the principal court of original civil jurisdiction of the district in which the chief building of the society is situated and the court shall make such order in the matter as it shall deem required by law and practically apt. The assent is necessarily required provided that no society shall be dissolved unless three-fifths of the members shall have expressed a wish for such dissolution by their votes delivered in person, or by proxy, at a general meeting convened for the purpose. There is also a concept of government consent. It is provided in the aforesaid statute that whenever any government is a member of, or a sponsor or contributor to, or otherwise interested in any society registered under this act, such society shall not be dissolved without the consent of the government of the state where the society was registered. There are also several state amendments given under this section.

=== Dissolution of society by a court ===
As per the provisions of this act, on the application of the Registrar under section 13A or under section 24 or on an application made by not less than one- tenth of the members of a society registered under this act, a court of competent jurisdiction referred to in section 13 may make an order for the dissolution of the society on any of the following grounds, viz.

(a) That the society has contravened any provision of this Act or of any other law for the time being in force and it is just and equitable that the society should be dissolved

(b) That the number of the members of the society is reduced below seven;

(c) That the society has ceased to function for more than three years preceding the date of such application;

(d) That the society is unable to pay its debts or meet its liabilities; or

(e) That the registration of the society has been cancelled under section 12D on the ground that its activities or proposed activities have been or are or will be opposed to public policy.

When an order for the dissolution of a society is made under sub-section (1) or sub-section (2), all necessary steps for the disposal and the settlement of the property of the society, its claims and liabilities and any other adjustment of its affairs take place in manner as the Court may direct.

=== Matters of profit upon dissolution ===
Under section 14 of the act, upon the dissolution of the society, no member is entitled to receive any profits. If upon the dissolution of a society registered under this Act there remains, after the satisfaction of all its debts and liabilities, any property whatsoever, the same will not be paid to or disseminated and distributed among the members of the said society or any of them, but is required by law to be given to some other society which is to be determined by the votes of not less than three-fifths of the members present individually or by proxy at the time of the dissolution, or, in default thereof, by such court as aforesaid. This clause does not to apply to the joint-stock companies. Provided, however, that this clause shall not apply to any society which has been founded or established by the contributions of share-holders in the nature of a joint-stock company.

== See also ==
- Brunei: Societies Act 1948, Societies Act 2005
- Hong Kong: Societies Ordinance 1949
- Malaysia: Societies Act 1966
- Singapore: Societies Act 1966
- Swiss Verein
- Company limited by guarantee
