= Malaysian Indian United Party =

Malaysian Indian United Party Parti Bersatu India Malaysia மலேசிய இந்திய ஐக்கிய கட்சி
- Abbreviation: MIUP
- President: Nallakaruppan Solaimalai
- Founder: Nallakaruppan Solaimalai
- Founded: 14 November 2007
- Split from: People's Justice Party
- Headquarters: Kuala Lumpur
- National affiliation: Friends of BN (since 2007)
- Colours: Red, blue, yellow, white
- Dewan Negara: 0 / 70
- Dewan Rakyat: 0 / 222
- Dewan Undangan Negeri: 0 / 587

Website
- nallaks.blogspot.my

Malaysian Indian United Party (Malay: Parti Bersatu India Malaysia, Tamil: மலேசிய இந்திய ஐக்கிய கட்சி, abbrev: MIUP) is a political party representing the Indian community in Malaysia. MIUP was founded and registered on 14 September 2007 and was launched on 25 November 2007 by Nallakaruppan Solaimalai or K.S. Nallakaruppan, who is better known as Anwar Ibrahim's 'tennis partner' after his resignation from Parti Keadilan Rakyat (PKR) because of his fallout with Anwar regarding the candidacy for the Ijok by-election, 2007.

MIUP supports and maintains friendly relations to the then governing Barisan Nasional (BN) although it is not an official member of the coalition but seeks to be admitted into the coalition.

== General election results ==
Election	Total seats won	Seats contested	Total votes	Voting Percentage	Outcome of election	Election leader
2022	0 / 222	1	TBD	TBD	TBD (Friends of BN)	Nallakaruppan Solaimalai

== See also ==
- Politics of Malaysia
- List of political parties in Malaysia
