= Punjabi Party of Malaysia =

Punjab Party of Malaysia Parti Punjab Malaysia
- Malay name: Parti Punjabi Malaysia ڤرتي ڤنجاب مليسيا
- Punjabi name: Panjābī Pārṭī Malā'iśiyā
- Abbreviation: PPM
- President: Gurjeet Singh Rhande
- Founder: Jeswant Singh
- Founded: 1986
- Legalised: 2003
- Headquarters: Tingkat 3, Bangunan TWU, Box 'C' 21, Jalan Barat, 46200 Petaling Jaya, Selangor
- National affiliation: Friends of BN (since 2000)
- Colours: Dark blue, red, white, yellow
- Dewan Negara: 0 / 70
- Dewan Rakyat: 0 / 222
- Dewan Undangan Negeri: 0 / 587

Election symbol
- BN

Party flag

Website
- partypunjabimalaysia.blogspot.my

The Punjabi Party of Malaysia (Malay: Parti Punjabi Malaysia, Punjabi: Panjābī Pārṭī Malā'iśiyā; abbreviated as PPM) is a Malaysian political party formed in 1986 but only successfully registered in 2003 to represent the interests of the Punjabi Malaysian community.

It is the only party in Malaysia founded specifically with the interests of Punjabi people in Malaysia as its mission. The party also champion the rights of the Sikh religious belief. Before the fall of Barisan Nasional (BN) in the 2018 general election, PPM was considered pro-BN and had been trying to join the previous governing coalition.

== President ==
1. Jeswant Singh (1986–2002)
2. Prof. Dato Dr. Gurdeep Perkash Singh (2002–2010)
3. Susheel Kaur (2010–2013)
4. Datuk Gurjeet Singh Rhande (23 November 2013 - current)

== See also ==
- List of political parties in Malaysia
- Politics of Malaysia
