= Flag and coat of arms of Perak =

Symbols of the Malaysian state

The flag and emblem of Perak are state symbols of Perak, Malaysia. These two symbols are distinct from each other in style. Similar to other states of Malaysia with Malay royalties, both the flag and arms of Perak are influenced by royalties, Islam, and political symbols of the state.

== Flag ==
Perak
- Use: Civil and state flag
- Proportion: 1:2
- Adopted: 1879
- Design: Three equally horizontal bands of white, yellow and black.

The flag of Perak, is a tricolour, made of three equal horizontal bands coloured white (top), yellow, and black (bottom). Adopted on 31 January 1879, it has a ratio of 1:2.

The stripes on the flag symbolise the three branches of the Perak royal family: white represents the reigning Sultan of Perak, yellow represents the Raja Muda (the crown prince), and black represents the Raja Di Hilir (the next in succession, after the crown prince). Coincidentally, the flag resembles an inverted version of the Russian imperial colours that were in official use from 1858 to 1896.

The three colours of the flag, plus red, formed the basis of the colours that were used in the flag of the British Federated Malay States.

Standard of the Sultan (1949-1963)

Standard of the Sultan (1963-1984)

Standard of the Sultan (1985-2014)

Standard of the Sultan (2015–present)

== Emblem ==
State emblem of Perak
- Armiger: Perak
- Motto: Negeri Perak (نڬري ڤراق), meaning State of Perak in Jawi and Perak in Rumi Script

The emblem of Perak consists of the symbol of the Sultan of Perak circled with a crescent that contains flowers of rice. The symbol of the Sultan of Perak symbolises the highness of the Sultan. The crescent denotes Islam as the state official religion, while the flowers of rice reflects the source of money for the people of Perak.

== City, district and municipal council emblems and flags ==
Emblem of Ipoh City Council

Perak currently does not adopt flags for its districts and municipal areas. However, flags of local governments (District councils, Municipal councils and City councils) were sometimes used to represent districts and municipal areas, although to a lesser extent.

Flag of Ipoh City Council
