= Societies Act 1966 =

Malaysian law on societies registration

Parliament of Malaysia
- Long title: An Act relating to registration of societies.
- Citation: Act 335
- Territorial extent: Throughout Malaysia
- Passed by: Dewan Rakyat
- Passed: 13 December 1965
- Enacted: 1966 (Act No. 13 of 1966); 1987 (Act 335 w.e.f. 19 October 1987)
- Passed by: Dewan Negara
- Passed: 22 December 1965
- Effective: [1 February 1966, P.U. 24/1966]

Legislative history

Initiating chamber: Dewan Rakyat
- Bill title: Societies Bill 1966
- Introduced by: Ismail Abdul Rahman, Minister of Home Affairs
- First reading: 1 December 1965
- Second reading: 13 December 1965
- Third reading: 13 December 1965

Revising chamber: Dewan Negara
- Bill title: Societies Bill 1966
- Member(s) in charge: Abdul Rahman Ya'kub, Minister of Lands and Mines
- First reading: 17 December 1965
- Second reading: 22 December 1965
- Third reading: 22 December 1965

Amended by
- Societies (Amendment) Act 1966 [Act 45/1966] Emergency (Essential Powers) Ordinance No. 45/1970 [P.U. (A) 282/1970] Societies (Amendment) Act 1972 [Act A102] Subordinate Courts Act (Extension) Order 1980 [P.U. (A) 357/1980] Societies (Amendment) Act 1981 [Act A515] Societies (Amendment) Act 1983 [Act A557] Societies (Amendment) Act 1988 [Act A700] Societies (Amendment) Act 1990 [Act A743] Societies (Amendment) Act 1993 [Act A859] Societies (Amendment) Act 1998 [Act A1027]

Related legislation
- Societies Ordinance 1949 of the States of Malaya [F.M. 28 of 1949] Societies Ordinance 1957 of Sarawak [Swk. Ord. 12 of 1957, Swk. Cap. 107] Societies Ordinance 1961 of Sabah [Sabah Ord. 24 of 1961]

Keywords
- Societies
- Status: In force

The Societies Act 1966 (Malay: Akta Pertubuhan 1966) is an Act of the Parliament of Malaysia, relating to the registration of societies.

== History ==
The precursor to the Societies Act was the Societies Ordinance of the Straits Settlement enacted in 1890. In the early years, societies that were clearly not secret societies were readily granted exemptions.

== Structure ==
The Societies Act 1966, in its current form (1 January 2006), consists of 3 Parts containing 70 sections and 2 schedules (including 10 amendments).

- Part I: Provisions Applicable to Societies Generally
- Part IA: Provisions Applicable to Political Parties Only
- Part II: Provisions Applicable to Mutual Benefit Societies Only
- Part III: Miscellaneous Provisions Applicable to Societies Generally
- Schedules

== See also ==
- Brunei: Societies Act 1948, Societies Act 2005
- Hong Kong: Societies Ordinance 1949
- India: Societies Registration Act, 1860
- Singapore: Societies Act 1966
- Swiss Verein
- Company limited by guarantee
