= People's Power Party (Malaysia) =

People's Power Party Parti Kuasa Rakyat
- Chinese name: 人民权利党; Rén mín Quán lì Dǎng
- Abbreviation: KUASA
- Chairperson: Kamarazaman Yaakob
- Founded: 10 October 2021; 5 years ago
- Ideology: Social democracy Multiracialism; Marhaenism; Nationalism
- Political position: Centre-left
- Colours: Red; White
- Slogan: Negera Rakyat. Kuasa Rakyat. Milik Rakyat.

Party flag

The Parti Kuasa Rakyat (lit. 'People's Power Party') is a political party that is based on Marhaenism. It is in favour of abolishing the Perbadanan Tabung Pendidikan Tinggi Nasional (PTPTN) and replacing it with scholarships involving the B40 and M40 groups, as well as free healthcare, environmental sustainability and "freeing people from the grip of middlemen and racial capital".

== History ==
It was founded by Ismail Sabri Yaakob's brother Kamarazaman Yaakob on 10 October 2021 and announced itself to become a member of Barisan Nasional

On 19 December 2021, Kamarazaman announced taking over Minority Rights Action Party (MIRA) and were named as president in order for it to be rebrand to Kuasa Rakyat. Months later, he were dropped from MINA presidency while waiting for Registrar of Society application on the rebrand.

On 28 August 2022, the party announced merging with Parti Bangsa Malaysia for 2022 Malaysian general election. Months later, Kamaruzaman announced the partnership is off.

The party is yet to join any election since its inception.

== Leadership structure ==
=== President ===
- Kamaruzaman Yaakob

=== Sponsor committee ===
- Nik Abdul Aziz Nik Hassan
- Gabriel Walter
- Gobalakrishnan Nagapan
- Mohamad Nasir Saludin
- Hamzah Jaaffar
- Anas Yusof Sulaiman
- Sahandri Gani Hamzah
- Helmi Ibrahim
- Razali Abd Razak
- Suharmili Rosle
- Ching I Boon
