= Politics of Malaysia =

Politics of Malaysia takes place in the framework of a federal representative democratic constitutional monarchy, in which the Yang di-Pertuan Agong is head of state and the Prime Minister of Malaysia is the head of government. Executive power is exercised by the federal government and the 13 state governments. Legislative power is vested in the federal parliament and the 13 state assemblies. The judiciary is independent of the executive and the legislature, though the executive maintains a certain level of influence in the appointment of judges to the courts.

The Constitution of Malaysia is codified and the system of government is based on the Westminster system. The hierarchy of authority in Malaysia, in accordance to the Federal Constitution, stipulates the three branches (administrative components) of the Malaysian government as consisting of the Executive, Judiciary and Legislative branch. Whereas, the Parliament consists of the Dewan Negara (Upper House/Senate) and Dewan Rakyat (Lower House/House of Representatives).

Malaysia has had a multi-party system since the first direct election of the Federal Legislative Council of Malaya in 1955 on a first-past-the-post basis. The ruling party was the Alliance Party (Malay: Parti Perikatan) coalition and from 1973 onwards, its successor, the Barisan Nasional (BN) coalition. Together with its predecessor the Alliance Party, BN had governed for 63 years since 1955 and was one of the world's longest serving governments until it lost power to the Pakatan Harapan (PH) coalition in the 2018 Malaysian general election. Following the 2020–22 Malaysian political crisis, the Perikatan Nasional (PN) government served from 1 March 2020 to 17 August 2021 when BN withdrew support and left the coalition.

As a result of the 2022 Malaysian general election, a hung parliament was elected. Anwar Ibrahim of the Pakatan Harapan (PH) coalition was appointed as the new Prime Minister to lead the grand coalition government known as the Unity Government, consisting of other political coalitions of BN, Gabungan Parti Sarawak (GPS), Gabungan Rakyat Sabah (GRS) and several other political parties and independents. Perikatan Nasional (PN), as the sole coalition not in the Unity Government, serves as the Opposition.

== Overview ==
Although Malaysian politics has been relatively stable since 1974 and after the turbulent decade of the 1960s which saw the 13 May incident, critics allege that "the government, ruling party, and administration are intertwined with few countervailing forces." However, since the 2008 general election, the media's coverage on the country's politics has noticeably increased as BN began gradually losing power and support.

The Economist Democracy Index rated Malaysia as a flawed democracy in 2016. Nevertheless, Malaysia was a runner up to The Economist "Country of the Year" in 2018 due to the peaceful transfer of power following the 2018 general election which saw the Barisan Nasional (BN) coalition lose power after 63 years. The country is considered by the V-Dem Institute to have the second highest electoral and liberal democracy scores in Southeast Asia after Timor-Leste.

== History ==
=== Early developments ===
Early organised political movements in Malaysia were organised along regional and ethnic groups and were not political parties in the modern sense. They generally were loose alliances of interest groups and individuals primarily concerned with social welfare, social progress and religious reform among the Muslim Malay communities similar to interest groups and civil society organisations of today.

==== Religious reformers ====
Religious reformers played a large role in developing and disseminating ideas with magazines and periodicals like al-Imam published in Singapore by Tahir Jalaluddin between 1906 and 1908, and al-Munir published in Penang by Abdullah Ahmad between 1911 and 1916. These in turn were primarily influenced by the Egyptian Islamic reform magazine, al-Manar published in Cairo by Rashid Rida from 1898 to 1936. While these publications were primarily concerned with the Islamic religion, it also touched extensively on the social, political and economic conditions of the Malays.

One of the first such movements was the New Hope Society (Malay: Persekutuan Pengharapan Belia) that was established in Johor Bahru in 1916. On 14 September 1923, a movement was established in Al-Azhar University in Cairo, Egypt by students from British Malaya and the Dutch East Indies known as the Al-Jam'iyah Al-Khairiyah lit-tholabah Al-Azhariyah Al-Jawiyah (renamed in 1937 to the Indonesia Malaya Convention or Perhimpunan Indonesia Malaya; PERPINDOM). Composed primarily of students influenced by the Young Turks movement and later the Muslim Brotherhood, the movement encouraged intentional political and religious discourse through periodicals like Osman Abdullah's Seruan Al-Azhar (Al-Azhar Clarion) and Pilehan Timur (Oriental Choice).

==== Teachers' unions ====
The Sultan Idris Training College for Malay teachers in Tanjung Malim was fertile ground for the exchange of ideas. The establishment of the Selangor Malay Teachers Association (Malay: Persatuan Guru-guru Melayu Selangor) in 1921 by Muhammad Yusof paved the way for similar organisations to be set up in the other Federated Malay States and a magazine known as Majalah Guru (Teacher's Magazine) was published in 1923. This magazine allowed for the discussion of larger socio-economic issues as well political issues, establishing itself as one of the influences in the development of Malay nationalism.

==== Self-help societies ====
Various self-help societies like the Maharani Company in Muar, Johor and the Serikat Pembaikan Hidup (Malay: Life Improvement Society) organised by Mohamad Eunos Abdullah of the Singapore Malay Union (Malay: Kesatuan Melayu Singapura) established co-operatives and communes to help improve the socio-economic conditions of the Malay peasants and smallholders. They too utilised newspapers and periodicals like the Maharani Company published Perjumpaan Melayu (Malay Convergence) to disseminate ideas and encourage discourse on issues pertaining to the social, political and economic conditions of the Malay people.

=== Early political organisations ===
==== Malay Union ====
The Malay Union (Malay: Kesatuan Melayu; KM) was established in 1926 by Mohamad Eunos Abdullah, Tengku Kadir Ali and Ambo Sooloh with the aim of increasing the role of Malays in public life, upholding Malay interests with the colonial authorities, and promote higher and technical education for Malays. Eunos himself was a Justice of Peace, a member of the Muslim Advisory Board set up by the colonial administration during World War I and a member of the Singapore Municipal Council. In his capacity as the chairman of the KM, he became the first Malay member of the Legislative Council of the Straits Settlements. One of the first issues championed by the KM was the appeal for land to be set aside for a Malay settlement. The appeal was granted and a sum of $ 700,000 was set aside for the KM to purchase and develop the land. This settlement has evolved and is now part of the Eunos neighbourhood in Singapore.

The KM also became the catalyst for the establishment of similar organisations in the other states of the British Malaya such as the Penang Malay Association (founded in 1927) and the Perak Malay Association (founded in 1937). People associated with the KM included the first President of Singapore, Yusof Ishak. The KM survived World War II and entered into a political coalition with the United Malays National Organisation and the Malayan Chinese Association to form the Singapore Alliance Party. It however eventually faded away with the electoral defeats of the Alliance in the 1955 legislative elections in Singapore.

==== Communist Party of Malaya ====
The first political party to be organised with a pan-Malayan outlook was the Communist Party of Malaya (CPM) established in 1930. The CPM was originally set up as a branch of the Comintern supervised by the Far Eastern Bureau of the Chinese Communist Party in 1926, then known as the South Seas Communist Party. The fraternal Communist Party of Indonesia (established in 1924) was forced underground and in exile due to their abortive revolt in 1926, which resulted in the CPM becoming exclusively dominated by people of Chinese descent. Efforts to establish a broader based representation were made especially in the 1935 representative conferences between the CPM and the General Labour Union as well as the establishment of contact with Communist cells in Siam and the Dutch East Indies in 1936. Nonetheless, the CPM remained an organisation that was predominantly Chinese in composition until the Japanese occupation of Malaya which saw a larger participation of people from other ethnicities.

==== Young Malay Union ====
The Young Malay Union (Malay: Kesatuan Melayu Muda; KMM) was established in Kuala Lumpur in 1938 under the leadership of Ibrahim Yaacob. While registered as a social organisation working to improve Malay youths in sports, education, agriculture, health and other recreational pursuits, the primary aim of the KMM was to struggle for the political independence of all the Malayan states from Britain and oppose British imperialism.

While gaining significant support from the larger Malay community, the KMM failed to gain support from the Malay aristocrats and bureaucracy and on the eve of the Japanese invasion of Malaya, more than 100 KMM members were arrested by the authorities for collaboration.

All were released after the fall of Singapore in February 1942. On 14 January 1942, a KMM delegation led by vice-president, Mustapha Hussain, met with the Japanese authorities to negotiate for the independence of Malaya. The Japanese authorities instead disbanded KMM and established the Pembela Tanah Ayer (also known as the Malai Giyu Gun or by its Malay acronym PETA) militia in its stead.

Most who joined PETA were also part of the underground KMM Youth League who continued to struggle for an independent Malaya and some cooperated with the CPM sponsored Malayan People's Anti-Japanese Army and other anti-Japanese guerilla units like Force 136 and Wataniah.

With the surrender of Japan in August 1945, former KMM cadres formed the nucleus of the emerging political movements like the Malay Nationalist Party, Angkatan Pemuda Insaf, and Angkatan Wanita Sedar.

== Political conditions ==
Malaysia's predominant political party, United Malays National Organization (UMNO), held power in the coalition known as the Barisan Nasional (formerly the Alliance Party) with other parties since Malaya's independence in 1957 until 2018. In 1974, the Alliance Party coalition, which comprised only three ethnic-based parties, was succeeded by the broader political coalition, Barisan Nasional. UMNO remained the dominant component of the coalition, alongside MCA (Malaysian Chinese Association) and MIC (Malaysian Indian Congress), and other component parties.

Since the 2018 general election, several political parties and coalitions compete in national and state-level elections in Malaysia. Major national political forces include Pakatan Harapan (PH), Barisan Nasional (BN), and Perikatan Nasional (PN). Major regional political forces also play a key role in national politics such as Gabungan Parti Sarawak (GPS) and Gabungan Rakyat Sabah (GRS) which are based in the Borneo states of Sarawak and Sabah respectively.

Unlike some countries close to Malaysia, such as Thailand or Indonesia, the armed forces are not prominent in politics.

The political process in Malaysia from 1957 to 2018 has generally been described as taking the form of "consociationalism" whereby "communal interests are resolved in the framework of a grand coalition". The executive branch is described as tending to dominate political activity, with the Prime Minister's office being in a position to preside "over an extensive and ever growing array of powers to take action against individuals or organisations," and "facilitate business opportunities". Critics of the ruling government generally agree that although authoritarianism in Malaysia preceded the administration of Mahathir bin Mohamad, it was he who "carried the process forward substantially". Legal scholars have suggested that the political "equation for religious and racial harmony" is rather fragile, and that this "fragility stems largely from the identification of religion with race coupled with the political primacy of the Malay people colliding with the aspiration of other races for complete equality."

During the terms of Dr. Mahathir Mohamad as the fourth Prime Minister of Malaysia, many constitutional amendments were made. For example, the Senate could only delay a bill from taking effect and the Monarch no longer had veto powers on proposed bills. Also, the 26 state senators were no longer the majority as another 44 senators were appointed by the King at the advice of the Prime Minister. The amendments also limited the powers of the judiciary to what parliament grants them.

In early September 1998, Prime Minister Mahathir dismissed Deputy Prime Minister Anwar Ibrahim and accused Anwar of immoral and corrupt conduct. Anwar said his ousting was actually owed to political differences and led a series of demonstrations advocating political reforms. Later in September, Anwar was arrested, beaten while in prison (by among others, the chief of police at the time), and charged with corrupt practices, in both legal and moral contexts, charges including obstruction of justice and sodomy. In April 1999, he was convicted of four counts of corruption and sentenced to six years in prison. In August 2000, Anwar was convicted of one count of sodomy and sentenced to nine years to run consecutively after his earlier six-year sentence. Both trials were viewed by domestic and international observers as unfair. Anwar's conviction on sodomy has since been overturned, and having completed his six-year sentence for corruption, he has since been released from prison. In the November 1999 general election, the Barisan Nasional returned to power with three-fourths of the parliamentary seats, but UMNO's seats dropped from 94 to 72. The opposition, the Barisan Alternatif coalition, led by the Islamic Party of Malaysia (PAS), increased its seats to 42. PAS retained control of the state of Kelantan and won the additional state of Terengganu.

The former 6th Prime Minister of Malaysia was Dato' Seri Mohd. Najib bin Tun Haji Abdul Razak. He took office following the retirement of Dato' Seri Abdullah Ahmad Badawi (colloquially known as "Pak Lah") in April 2009. Mahathir Mohamad took office as the Prime Minister of Malaysia under the new Pakatan Harapan government on 10 May 2018.

In the March 2004 general election, Dato' Seri Abdullah Ahmad Badawi led Barisan Nasional to a landslide victory, in which Barisan Nasional recaptured the state of Terengganu. The coalition controlled 92% of the seats in Parliament. In 2005, Mahathir stated that "I believe that the country should have a strong government but not too strong. A two-thirds majority like I enjoyed when I was Prime Minister is sufficient but a 90% majority is too strong. ... We need an opposition to remind us if we are making mistakes. When you are not opposed you think everything you do is right."

The national media is largely controlled by the government and by political parties in the Barisan Nasional/National Front ruling coalition and the opposition has little access to the media. The print media is controlled by the Government through the requirement of obtaining annual publication licences under the Printing and Presses Act. In 2007, a government agency – the Malaysian Communications and Multimedia Commission – issued a directive to all private television and radio stations to refrain from broadcasting speeches made by opposition leaders.

The official state philosophy and ideology of Malaysia is the Rukun Negara, which consists of five core principles that serve as a guide for living in society: Belief in God, Loyalty to the King and Country, Supremacy of the Constitution, Rule of Law, and Courtesy and Morality."

Executive power is vested in the cabinet led by the prime minister; the Malaysian constitution stipulates that the prime minister must be a member of the lower house of parliament who, in the opinion of the Yang di-Pertuan Agong, commands a majority in parliament. The cabinet is chosen from among members of both houses of Parliament and is responsible to that body.

In recent years, the former opposition, now government has been campaigning for freer and fairer elections within Malaysia. On 10 November 2007, a mass rally, called the 2007 Bersih Rally, took place in the Dataran Merdeka, Kuala Lumpur at 3 pm to demand for clean and fair elections. The gathering was organised by BERSIH, a coalition comprising political parties and civil society groups(NGOs), and drew supporters from all over the country.

On 11 November, the Malaysian government briefly detained de facto opposition leader Anwar Ibrahim on Tuesday and arrested a human rights lawyer and about a dozen opposition leaders, amid growing complaints that the government was cracking down on dissent. Dozens of policemen blocked the main entrance to the parliament building in Kuala Lumpur to foil an opposition-led rally. The rally was carried out along with the attempt to submit a protest note to Parliament over a government-backed plan to amend a law that would extend the tenure of the Election Commission chief, whom the opposition claims is biased.

The Malaysian government intensified efforts on 6 March 2008 to portray opposition figure Anwar Ibrahim as a political turncoat, days ahead of the 2008 Malaysian general election on 8 March 2008 because he posed a legitimate threat to the ruling coalition. Campaigning wrapped up 7 March 2008 for general elections that could see gains for Malaysia's opposition amid anger over race and religion among minority Chinese and Indians. Malaysians voted 8 March 2008 in parliamentary elections. Election results showed that the ruling government suffered a setback when it failed to obtain two-thirds majority in parliament, and five out of 12 state legislatures were won by the opposition parties. Reasons for the setback of the ruling party, which has retained power since the nation declared independence in 1957, were rising inflation, crime and ethnic tensions.

2018 marks the first time since independence in 1957 that a non-UMNO party namely PH formed the federal government. PH leader Anwar Ibrahim was then freed after receiving a royal pardon from the king and was designated to take over as PM from Mahathir Mohamad. However, things did not go well and the 22 months-old Pakatan Harapan administration fell in March 2020 during the 2020 political crisis, having lost the majority number of seats required to hold power as government. They were then replaced by the Perikatan Nasional government, with Muhyiddin as Prime Minister. However, Prime Minister Muhyiddin Yassin resigned after 17 months in office.

On 21 August 2021, Ismail Sabri Yaakob was sworn in as the country’s ninth prime minister. The new prime minister was a veteran politician from UMNO.

In the November 2022 Malaysian general election, opposition leader Anwar Ibrahim’s Pakatan Harapan (PH) coalition won 82 seats and former Prime Minister Muhyiddin Yassin’s Perikatan Nasional (PN) gained 73 seats. Prime Minister Ismail Sabri Yaakob’s ruling Barisan Nasional (BN) coalition was the biggest loser, securing just 30 seats in the 222-member parliament. On 24 November 2022, Anwar Ibrahim was sworn in as the 10th Prime Minister of Malaysia.

== Monarch ==
The monarch of Malaysia is the Yang di-Pertuan Agong (YDPA), commonly referred to as the Supreme King of Malaysia. Malaysia is a constitutional elective monarchy, the Yang di-Pertuan Agong is selected for a five-year term from among the nine Sultans of the Malay states. The other four states that do not have monarch kings, are ruled by governors. The nine sultans and four governors together make up the Conference of Rulers who elect the Yang di-Pertuan Agong. The position has to date been, by informal agreement, based on systematic rotation between the nine sultans; the order was originally based on seniority.

According to the Federal Constitution of Malaysia, the YDPA is considered as the Supreme Head of the Federation (Article 32). As a constitutional head, the YDPA is to act on the advice of the Prime Minister (Article 40). The YDPA or monarch king basically has three broad power vested in him (Jeong, 2012):

- The power to exercise based on the advice from the Prime Minister, the Cabinet, and the Conference of Rulers (Article 32, 38, 40)
- The power to exercise based on his discretionary power (without the consent or influence of any other authority)
- The power to pardon (granting of pardons), reprieves and respites, and/or of remitting, suspending or commuting sentences, under Clause (12) of Article 42.

The YDPA is also the Supreme Commander of the Armed Forces (i.e. Police, Army) in the Federation of Malaysia (Article 41). He is also the head of the Islamic faith in Malaysia.

== System of government ==
Malaysia is a federation of 13 states and 3 federal territories. The system of government in Malaysia is closely modelled on that of Westminster parliamentary system, a legacy of British colonial rule. In practice however, more power is vested in the executive branch of government than in the legislative, and the judiciary has been weakened by sustained attacks by the government during the Mahathir era. Parliamentary elections are held at least once every five years, usually concurrent with state elections for state assemblies except for Sabah (until 2004) and Sarawak.

== Branches of federal government ==
=== Legislative ===
The Parliament building in Kuala Lumpur

Legislative power is divided between federal and state legislatures. The bicameral parliament consists of the lower house, the House of Representatives or Dewan Rakyat (literally the "Chamber of the People"); and the upper house, the Senate or Dewan Negara (literally the "Chamber of the Nation"). All seventy Senate members sit for three-year terms (to a maximum of two terms); twenty-six are elected by the thirteen state assemblies, and forty-four are appointed by the king based on the advice of the Prime Minister. The 222 members of the Dewan Rakyat are elected from single-member districts by universal adult suffrage. Parliament has a maximum mandate of five years by law. The king may dissolve parliament at any time, and usually does so upon the advice of the Prime Minister. General elections must be held within sixty days of the dissolution of parliament. In practice, this has meant that elections have been held every three to five years at the discretion of the Prime Minister.

Legislative power is divided between federal and state legislatures. Malaysia has two sources of law. The national constitution, the nation's supreme law, can be amended by a two-thirds majority in parliament. (Since its formation, the BN has never lacked the necessary two-thirds until 8 March 2008's General Election) The second source of law is sharia (Islamic law), which applies only to Muslims. The federal government has little input into the administration of sharia; it falls to the states to implement Islamic law, and interpretations vary from state to state. The parliament follows a multi-party system and the governing body is elected through a first-past-the-post system.

=== Executive ===
Executive power is vested in the cabinet led by the prime minister; the Malaysian constitution stipulates that the prime minister must be a member of the Lower House of parliament who, in the opinion of the Yang di-Pertuan Agong (YDPA), commands a majority in parliament. The cabinet is chosen from among members of both houses of Parliament and is responsible to that body.

The Executive branch of the government consists of the Prime Minister as the head of the government, followed by the various ministers of the Cabinet. It formulates various socio-economic policies and development plans, for the development of the country as a whole. The Executive has the power and authority to generate revenues through the collection of various taxes, levies, fines, summons, custom duties, and fees, to name some, from the general public.

=== Judicial ===
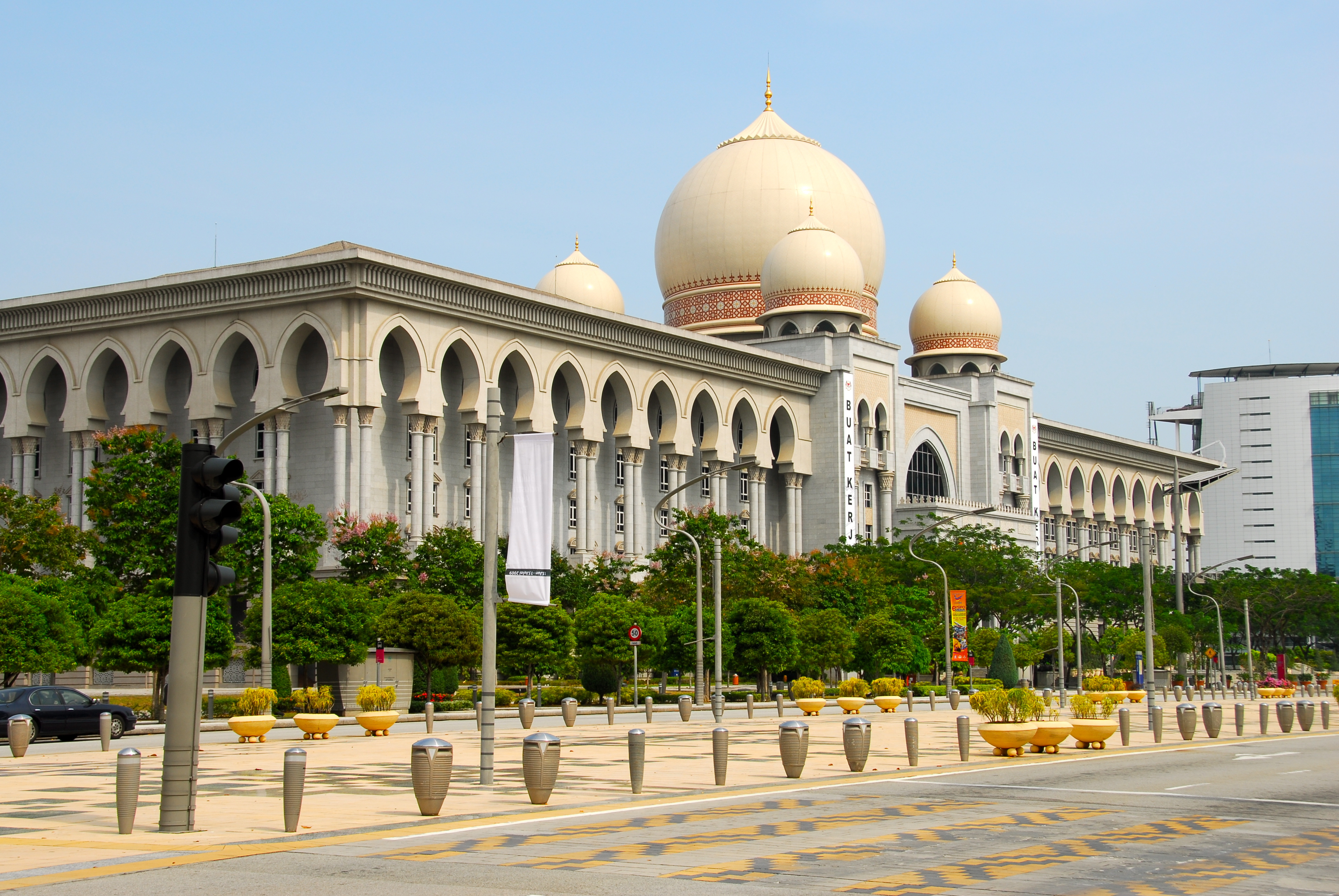
The Palace of Justice in Putrajaya, housing the Court of Appeal and the Federal Court

The judiciary is theoretically independent of the executive and the legislature, although supporters of the government hold many judicial positions. The highest court in the judicial system is the Federal Court, followed by the Court of Appeal, and two High Courts, one for Peninsular Malaysia, and one for East Malaysia. The subordinate courts in each of these jurisdictions include Sessions Courts, Magistrates' Courts, and Courts for Children. Malaysia also has a Special Court to hear cases brought by or against all Royalty.

The Special Court was established in 1993 to hear cases brought by or against any Rulers. Before its establishment, Rulers were immune from any proceedings brought against them in their personal capacity. Rulers include the Yang di-Pertuan Agong (the elected Monarch), and the heads of state of Malaysia's component states.

Separate from the civil courts are the Syariah Courts, which decide on cases which involve Malaysian Muslims. These courts run parallel to the normal court system, and are undergoing reforms that include the first ever appointment of female judges. Debate exists in Malaysia over whether the country should be secular or Islamic. Some state governments controlled by the Pan-Malaysian Islamic Party (PAS), including that of Terengganu, have passed Islamic laws, but these have not gone into effect due to opposition from the federal government.

== Legal system ==
Malaysia's legal system is based on English Common Law, alongside a Sharia court system for Malaysian Muslims. The Federal Court reviews decisions referred from the Court of Appeals; it has original jurisdiction in constitutional matters and in disputes between states or between the federal government and a state. Peninsular Malaysia and the East Malaysian states of Sabah and Sarawak each has a high court. The federal government has authority over external affairs, defence, internal security, justice (except civil law cases among Malays or other Muslims and other indigenous peoples, adjudicated under Islamic and traditional law), federal citizenship, finance, commerce, industry, communications, transportation, and other matters.

== State governments ==
Each state has a unicameral state legislative chamber (Malay: Dewan Undangan Negeri) whose members are elected from single-member constituencies. State governments are led by Chief Ministers (Menteri Besar in Malay states or Ketua Menteri in states without hereditary rulers), who are state assembly members from the majority party in the Dewan Undangan Negeri. They advise their respective sultans or governors. In each of the states with a hereditary ruler, the Chief Minister is required to be an ethnic Malay, appointed by the Sultan upon the recommendation of the Prime Minister. Parliamentary elections are held at least once every five years, with the last general election being in May 2018. Registered voters of age 18 and above may vote for the members of the House of Representatives and, in most of the states, for the state legislative chamber. Voting is not mandatory. Although Malaysia is a federal state, political scientists have suggested that its "federalism is highly centralised":

Our federalism gives the federal government not only the most legislative and executive powers but also the most important sources of revenue. State governments are excluded from the revenues of income tax, export, import and excise duties, and they are also largely restricted from borrowing internationally. They have to depend on revenue from forests, lands, mines, petroleum, the entertainment industry, and finally, transfer payments from the central government.

== Participation ==
Race plays a large role in Malaysian politics, and many Malaysian political parties are ethnically based. The Government's New Economic Policy (NEP) and the National Development Policy (NDP) which superseded it, were implemented to advance the standing of Bumiputera Malaysians. The policies provide preferential treatment to Malays over non-Malays in employment, education, scholarships, business, and access to cheaper housing and assisted savings. While improving in the economic position of Malays, it is a source of resentment amongst non-Malays. The race-based politics practiced by UMNO has been widely criticised as racist and discriminatory. Prime Minister Dato Sri Mohd Najib Tun Razak has claimed to attempt to close racial divides through the 1Malaysia initiative. This, however, has not helped much.

The origin of race based politics can be traced back to independence of Malaysia from United Kingdom, who wanted all citizens of Malaysia to be equal upon independence, instead of dominance by Malays. This caused the political parties of the three major races at the time, the UMNO (representing Malays), the MCA (representing Chinese), and the MIC (representing Indians), to join and form the Alliance Party.

Students are not allowed to be involved in politics, due to the University and University College Act. A higher interest in the political process led to a slowdown in outbound corporate travel in anticipation of the general election in the first half of 2013, where many travellers postponed travel to ensure they had the chance to cast their votes.

In June 2023, Malaysian Prime Minister Anwar Ibrahim stressed that he was committed to transitioning Malaysia from race-based to needs-based affirmative action policies.

== Foreign relations ==
Malaysia participates in international politics and engages in formal relationships with international bodies as well as with foreign states adopting various policies. Malaysia's participation in international politics also affects domestic politics for example the Israel–Malaysia relations.

== See also ==
- Censorship in Malaysia
- Human rights in Malaysia
- List of political parties in Malaysia

== Books ==
- James Chin. Politics of Federal Intervention in Malaysia, with reference to Kelantan, Sarawak and Sabah, Journal of Commonwealth and Comparative Politics, Vol. 35, No 2 (July) 1997, pp 96–120
- Abdul Rashid Moten & Syed Serajul Islam. (2005). Introduction to Political Science. Singapore: Thomson Publication.
- Ahmad Ibrahim, Tan Sri Datuk Seri. (1992). The Malaysian Legal System. Kuala Lumpur: Dewan Bahasa & Pustaka.
- ILBS. (2007). Federal Constitution of Malaysia. Kuala Lumpur: International Law Book Services.
- Jeong Chun Hai @ Ibrahim & Nor Fadzlina Nawi. (2012). Principles of Public Administration: Malaysian Perspectives. Kuala Lumpur: Pearson Publishers.
- Jeong Chun Hai @ Ibrahim. (2007). Fundamental of Development Administration. Selangor: Scholar Press.
- Wan Arfah Hamzah & Ramy Bulan. (2003). The Malaysian Legal System. Kuala Lumpur: Penerbit Fajar Bakti.
