= Malaysian Indians =

Malaysians of Indian ancestry

Orang India Malaysia
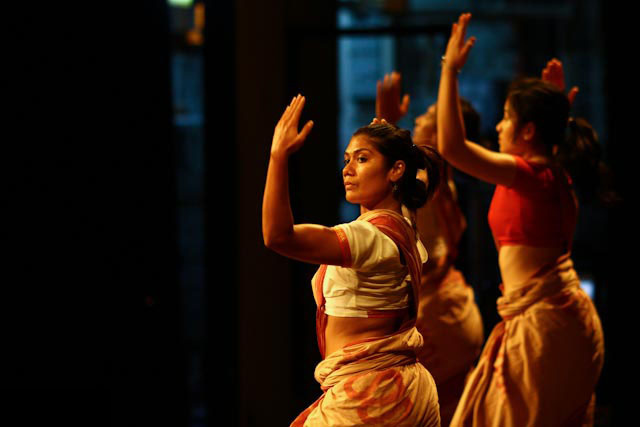

Total population
- 2,019,600; 6.6% of the Malaysian population (2020)

Regions with significant populations
- West coast of Peninsular Malaysia (mostly in Selangor, Negeri Sembilan, Perak, Penang, Kuala Lumpur, Kedah and Johor); Singapore

Languages
- Malaysian Tamil/Tamil (majority) • English • Malay • Melayu Chetty • Other Indian languages such as: Punjabi; Telugu; Malayalam; Sindhi; Bengali; Kannada; Hindi-Urdu; others

Religion
- Predominantly; Hinduism; Minorities; Christianity · Islam · Buddhism · Sikhism · Jainism · Zoroastrianism · Baháʼí

Related ethnic groups
- Indians; Indian diaspora; Tamil Malaysians; Malaysian Telugus; Malaysian Malayali; Malaysian Gujaratis; South Asian diaspora; Tamil diaspora; Telugu diaspora; Malayali diaspora; Tamils; Sri Lankan Tamils; Telugus; Malayalis; Kannadigas; Chitty; Burmese Tamils; Dravidians; Indian Singaporeans; Indo-Mauritians; Indo-Fijians; Indians in South Africa; Indian diaspora in Southeast Africa; Indo-Caribbeans; Tamil Mauritians; South Indians in Fiji; Gujaratis; Punjabis; Sindhis; Gujarati diaspora; Punjabi diaspora; Sindhi diaspora; Chindians; Jawi Peranakan

Malaysian Indians or Indo-Malaysians are Malaysian citizens of Indian ancestry. Most are descendants of those who migrated from India to British Malaya from the mid-19th to the mid-20th centuries. Most Malaysian Indians are ethnic Tamils; smaller groups include the Malayalees, Telugus and Punjabis. Malaysian Indians form the fifth-largest community of Overseas Indians in the world. In Malaysia, they represent the third-largest group, constituting 7% of the Malaysian population, after the Bumiputera (combined grouping of ethnic Malays and other indigenous groups) and the Chinese. They are usually referred to simply as "Indians" in English, Orang India in Malay, and Yinduren in Chinese.

Malaysia's Indian population is notable for its class stratification, with a significant elite and a large low income group within its fold. Malaysian Indians large percentage of professionals per capita by constituting 15.5% of Malaysia's professionals in 1999 has been reduced with substantial population close to 40% is now considered the B40 category. In the 1984 census, up to 38% of the nation's medical professional workforce consisted of Malaysian Indians, but this has been since been reduced. In 1970, the per-capita income of Malaysian Indians was 76% higher than that of the Malay majority. Despite attempts by the Malaysian government to redistribute wealth since the 1970s through institutionalized racial policy, by 2005 Malaysian Indians still earned a 27% higher per capita income than that of the dominant Malay community.

== History ==
=== First Wave: Pre-colonial period ===
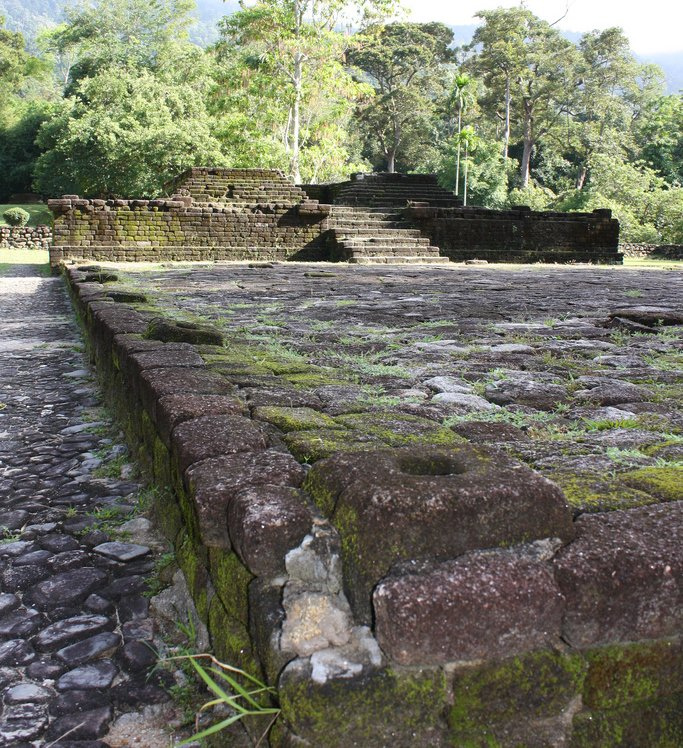
Candi Bukit Batu Pahat in Bujang Valley. A Hindu-Buddhist kingdom ruled ancient Kedah possibly as early as 110 A.D, this might be the evidence of Hindu-Buddhist influence before the onset of Islam in Kedah's Kedahan Malays.

Ancient India exerted a profound influence over Southeast Asia through trade, religious missions, wars and other forms of contact. Pre-colonial Malaysia was part of the Malay Kingdoms with Hindu-Buddhist influence such as Srivijaya, and the Majapahit, which formed part of a cultural region known as India. There is a possibility that the first wave of migration from India towards Southeast Asia happened during Asoka's invasion towards Kalinga and Samudragupta's expedition towards the South.

The Arab and Indian traders had travelled this region including the southern tip of South East Asia the peninsula with maritime trade, the Sailendra kings of Java were able to take control of the Peninsular and part of southern Siam. The kings welcomed Buddhist missionaries from India, accepting their teaching of the Mahayana sect, which spread through their territories. However, central and northeastern Thailand continued to adhere to the Hinayana teachings of the Theravada sect, which had been introduced by missionaries sent by the emperor Ashoka in the 3rd century BC. Another theory of the introduction of Buddhism after Indian arrived in the peninsula is that after Kalinga conquered lower Burma in the 8th century their influence gradually spread down the peninsula. The ancient Indian Kalinga was located in southeastern India occupying modern day Orissa and northern Andhra Pradesh. In the 7th century an Indonesian kingdom was named Kalingga after the aforementioned Kalinga in India. Chinese sources mention this kingdom (Holing) as a center for Buddhist scholars around 604 before it was overshadowed by the Sanjaya or Mataram kingdom. The most famous Kalingga ruler is Ratu Sima.

There is evidence of the existence of Indianised kingdoms such as Gangga Negara, Old Kedah, Srivijaya since approximately 1700 years ago. Early contact between the kingdoms of Tamilakkam and the Malay peninsula had been very close during the reigns of the Pallava dynasty (from the 4th to the 9th century CE) and Chola dynasty (from the 9th to the 13th century CE). The trade relations the Tamil merchants had with the ports of Malaya led to the emergence of Indianised kingdoms like Kadaram (Old Kedah) and Langkasugam. Furthermore, Chola king Rajendra Chola I sent an expedition to Kadaram (Srivijaya) during the 11th century conquering that country on behalf of one of its rulers who sought his protection and to have established him on the throne. The Cholas had a powerful merchant and naval fleet in the Indian Ocean and the Bay of Bengal. Three kinds of craft are distinguished by the author of the Periplus – light coasting boats for local traffic, larger vessels of a more complicated structure and greater carrying capacity, and lastly the big ocean-going vessels that made the voyages to Malaya, Sumatra, and the Ganges. In Malacca Sultanate, the Chitty people, played a huge role in Malacca's administration of the local ports such as Raja Mudaliar, Syahbandar (Chief of Port) of Malacca and Bendahara Tun Mutahir, a famous Bendahara of the Malaccan Sultanate.

=== Second Wave: Colonial period ===
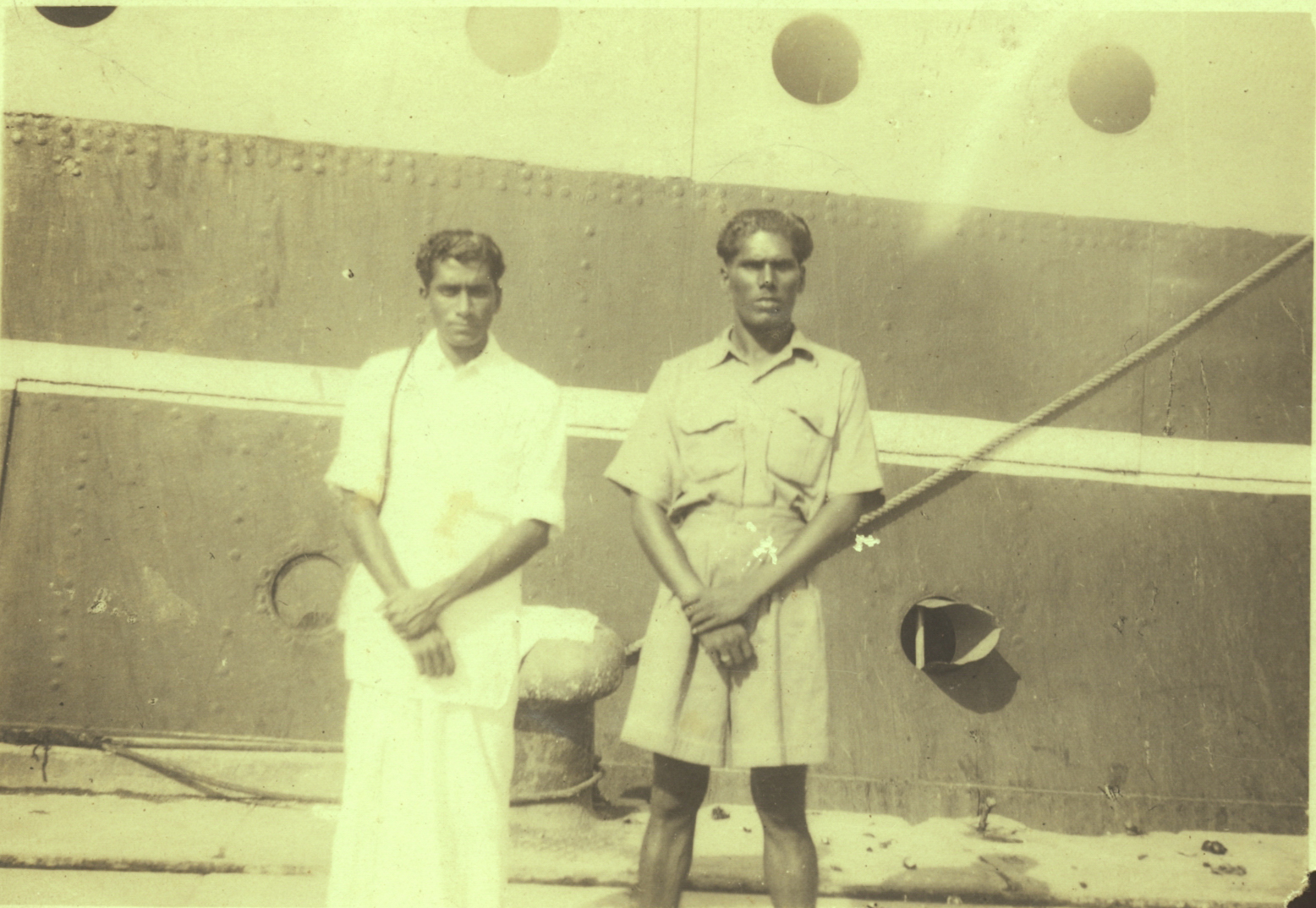
SS Rajula, operating her fortnightly "Straits Service" between Madras to Penang, Port Klang and Singapore from 1926 to 1972. The vessel transported many Indian migrants between South India to then-British Malaya as well as independent Malaysia.

Following the Portuguese colonisation of Malacca (Malaysia) in 1511, the Portuguese government encouraged their explorers to bring their married Indian women who were converted already to Roman Catholic Christianity, under a policy set by Afonso de Albuquerque, then Viceroy of India. These people were Goan Catholics (Konkani Catholics) and Bombay East Indians (Catholics of Marathi descent). Kuparis who were of mixed Samvedic Brahmin, Goan and Portuguese descent also arrived. Their children already intermarried with Malay population, losing their ethnic identities. British acquisition of Penang, Melaka, and Singapore - the Straits Settlements from 1786 to 1824 started a steady inflow of Indian labour. This consisted of traders, policemen, plantation labourers and colonial soldiers (see sepoys). Apart from this there was also substantial migration of Indians to work in the British colonial government, due to their general good command of the English language.

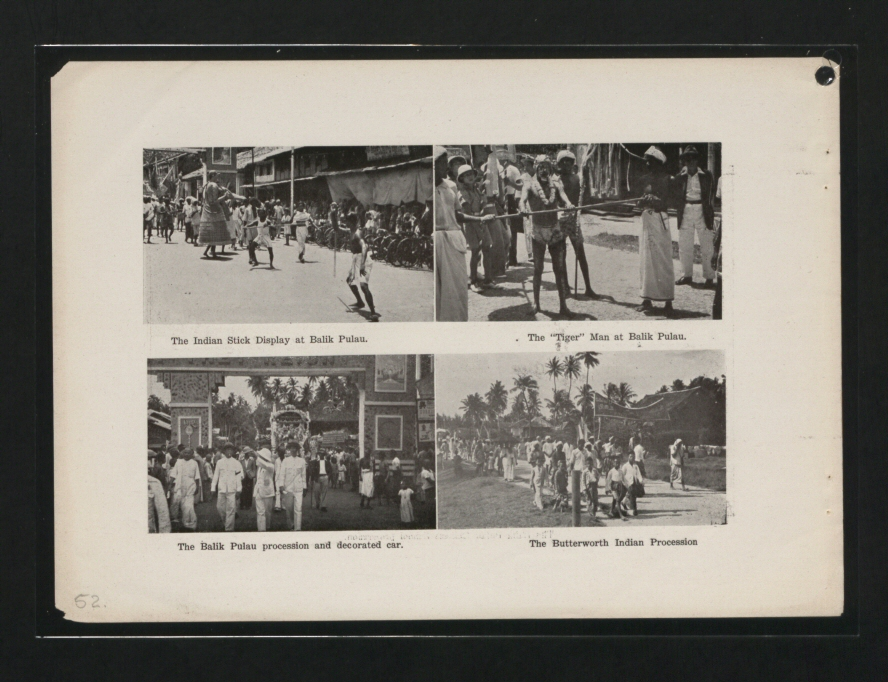
Thaipusam Celebration in Balik Pulau, Penang. 1937

The establishment of the plantations and the need for mass labour led to an influx of Indian migrants working under the indenture Kangani system in the 19th and early 20th century. Some, after the Kangani system ended in the early 20th century, also paid for their own passage to Malaya. These migrant workers were primarily Tamils (around 80%), with some Telugus, Malayalis as well as Bengalis from eastern India and Punjabis from western India. The Tamil migrants were primarily from Tamil Nadu. These workers were distinct from the commercial and educated group of urban Indians, who were often Tamils, Telugus, Malayali, Punjabis, and Bengalis. The Gujaratis, Sindhis and Marwaris arrived as "passenger Indians" much like in other British colonies. These urban Indians may be Hindus, Christians, Sikhs or Muslims. The Sikhs mainly worked in the police force, while other northern Indians were involved in business. The Malayalees, Ceylonese and Christian Tamils may be involved in government and private white-collar work, the Chettiar in money-lending or finance, while the Vellalar and Muslim Tamils may be in various kind of businesses.

The Indian population in pre-independence Malaya and Singapore was predominantly adult males who were single or with family back in India and Sri Lanka. Hence the population fluctuated frequently with periods of immigration to Malaya and periods of exodus of people back to India. As early as 1901 the Indian population in the Straits Settlements and the Federated Malay States was approximately 120,000. By 1931 there were 640,000 Indians in Malaya and Singapore and they even outnumbered the native Malays in the state of Selangor that year.

However, during World War II many Indian men and women left for Burma as part of the Indian National Army with thousands thought to have perished. As a result, the population of Indians in 1957 had only increased to 820,000. While immigration was a major factor for the increase in population until Independence, the population growth began falling after that as the white collar classes in the civil service and plantations left when British institutions and companies left the country. Since then, lower birth rates and emigration to countries like Singapore, Australia, UK, etc. in search of better educational and economic opportunities meant that Indians continue to see their share of Malaysia's population decline just as is the case with the Chinese. Today, Malaysian Indians account for approximately 7 per cent of the total population of Malaysia (approx. 2 million) and 9 per cent in Singapore (450,000).

=== Third Wave: Contemporary period ===
From the 1990s to the present period, there has also been a much smaller wave of Indian nationals into Singapore and Malaysia to work in the construction and engineering industry, restaurants, the IT sector, teaching and finance with many taking up permanent residence in Singapore where they account for nearly a quarter of the Singapore population. The unskilled labour mainly work in Indian restaurants. There are also foreign spouses from the Indian Subcontinent who are married to local Indians.

== Demographics ==
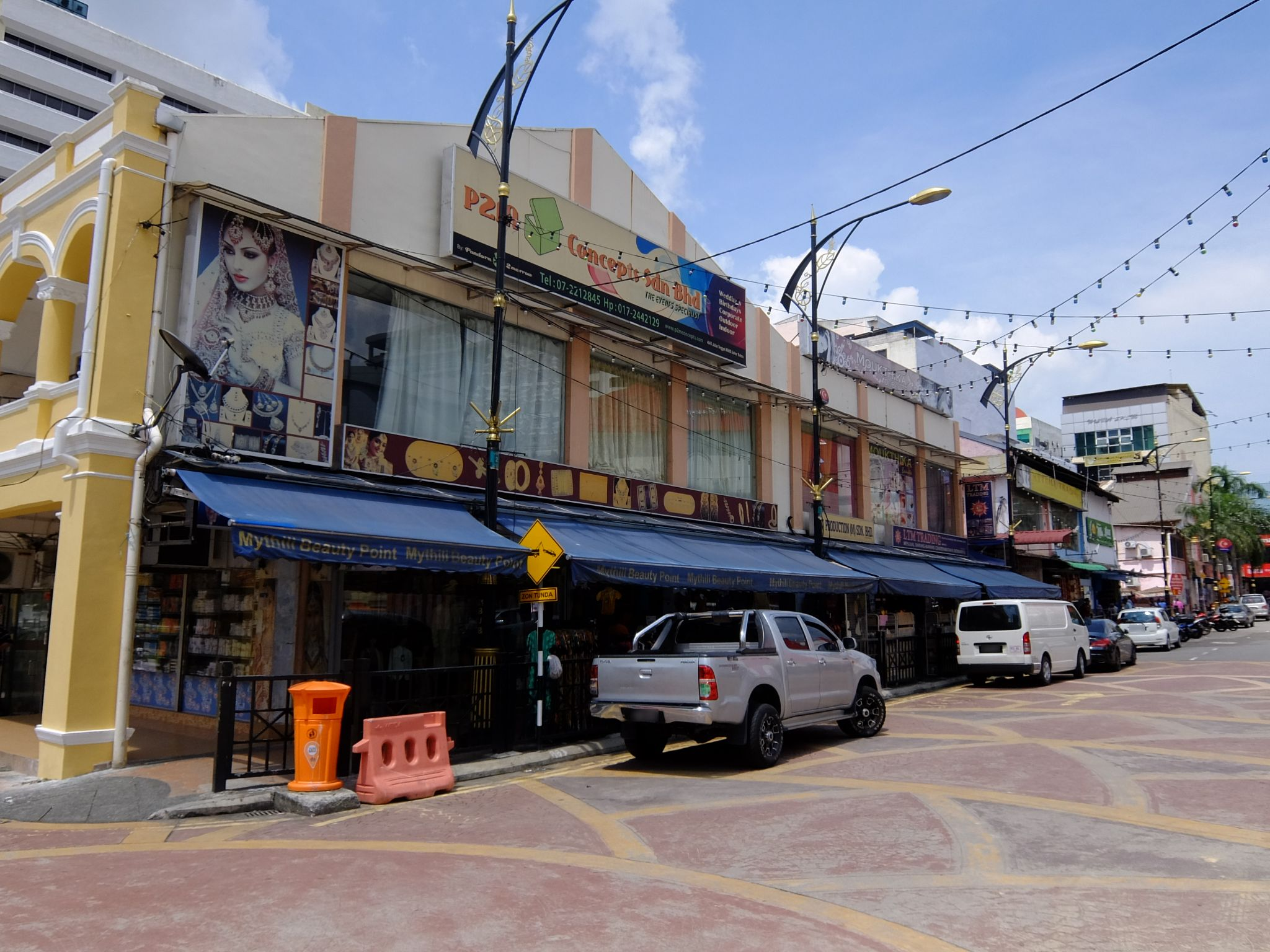
Little India in Johor Bahru, Johor.

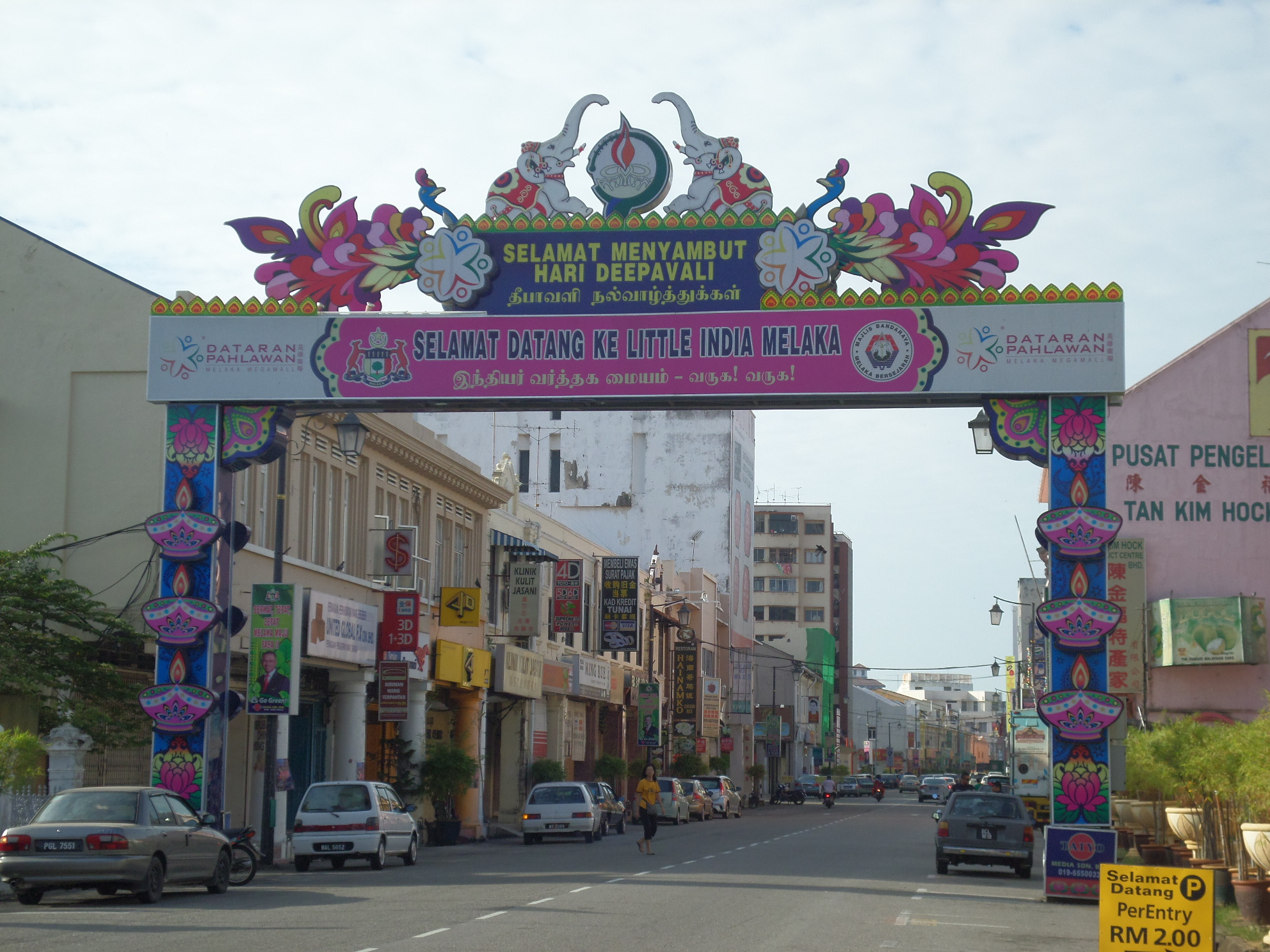
Little India in Melaka City, Melaka.

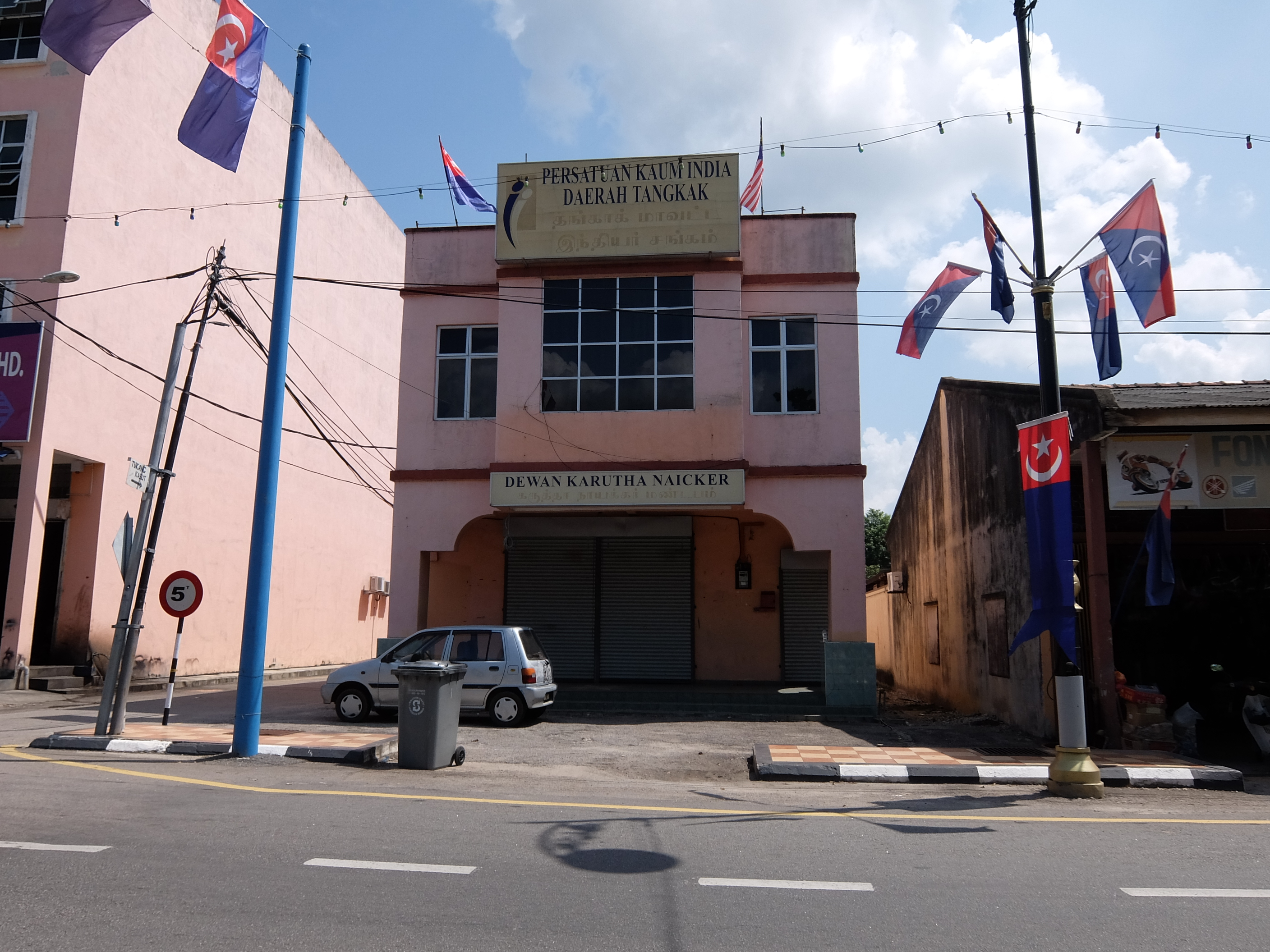
Tangkak District Indian Association in Tangkak, Johor.

6.6% of the Malaysian population are Indians as of 2020. Between 1800 to 1920, 740k Indians migrated to Malaysia. Between 1921 to 1945, 377k migrated to Malaysia, with the migration stream declining to 80k between 1946 to 1960.

There is a close correspondence between the various ethnic and occupational divisions of the Malaysian community, and this is inevitably reflected in the Indian community's geographical distribution in Malaya. The South Indian Tamils were the majority throughout the country, on the rubber estates and railways, though a significant proportion found employment on the docks in Penang and Singapore. Selangor is the state with the most number of Indians in terms of absolute number whereas Negeri Sembilan is the state with the highest proportion of Malaysian Indians making up the population.

State	Population^{A}			
State	2010		2015^{B}	
State	Total	Proportion	Total	Proportion
Johor	217,058	7.1%	230,700	7.0%
Kedah	136,482	7.3%	143,200	7.2%
Kelantan	3,849	0.3%	4,800	0.3%
Malacca	49,037	6.2%	51,400	6.2%
Negeri Sembilan	146,214	15.2%	154,000	14.9%
Pahang	63,065	4.4%	66,300	4.3%
Perak	281,688	12.3%	293,300	12.2%
Penang	153,472	10.4%	166,000	10.6%
Perlis	2,745	1.2%	3,100	1.3%
Sabah	7,453	0.3%	12,200	0.5%
Sarawak	7,411	0.3%	7,900	0.3%
Selangor	679,130	13.5%	712,000	13.2%
Terengganu	2,397	0.2%	3,000	0.3%
Kuala Lumpur	156,316	10.3%	163,000	10.1%
Labuan	641	0.9%	800	0.9%
Putrajaya	869	1.5%	900	1.0%

- ^Note A Non-citizens are excluded in figures and percentage
- ^Note B Population estimates are rounded to the nearest hundred.

== Education ==
There are significant differences between Malaysian Indians who are part of the Malaysian working class in plantations and urban middle class or upper middle class professionals. Many Indians are workers in plantations and attend Tamil language schools. Tamil language primary schools are funded by the Federal Government, but Tamil schools on private lands are not eligible for full government grant. Although Tamil is used as the medium of instruction, Malay and English are taught as compulsory subjects. Tamil schools may range from single classroom where students of varying age and ability are taught by a single teacher, to large schools of a few hundreds students. In plantation estates the schools may be poorly staffed and equipped, and few of their students moved on to higher education. Those Indians who do well in schools are primarily from the urban middle classes.

There are also significant challenges in higher education opportunity for Indians due to an education system that favors the Bumiputera Malays. Racial discrimination in government school have been reported, with Indian students suffering the most due to their ethnicity, color of the skin, or beliefs.

== Economy and employment ==
There are considerable differences socially and economically between different groups of Indians in Malaysia. They form a significant part of the professional classes in Malaysia; in a census taken in 1999, Malaysian Indians were 15.5% of Malaysia's professional workforce. These include doctors (28.4%), lawyers (26.8%), dentists (21%), veterinary surgeons (28.5%), engineers (6.4%), accountants (5.8%), surveyors (3.0%) and architects (1.5%). However, many Indians are also ranked amongst the most disadvantaged. In 1970, around 39% of Indians in Malaysia were ranked among the poorest of the country. Incidence of poverty (those in the lowest 40% of the national income distribution) in Malaysia was 27.3% Indians. Official figures suggest that the percentage of Indians living below the official poverty line has decreased from 39.2% in 1970 to 1.9% in 2002, but the figures have been criticised as inaccurate. It has been claimed around 40% of Indians are at the bottom rung of the income ladder in 2015.

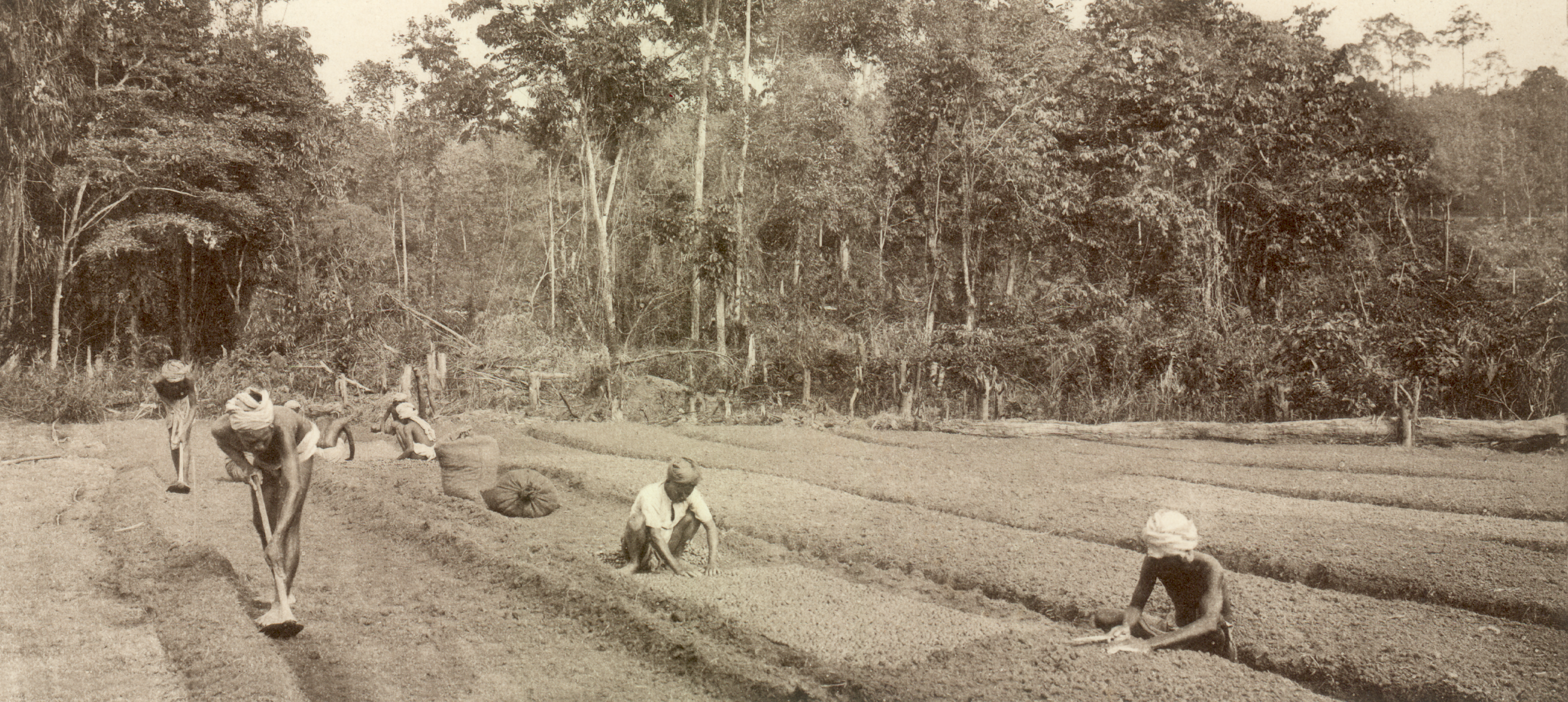
Workers in a plantation c. 1910

Many of the early South Indian immigrants such as the Tamils and Telugus worked in the agriculture sector, in particular as workers in plantations. In 1930, 60% of all Indians were in this sector, and by 1970, 45% of Indians were still involved in agriculture in Malaysia. Sri Lanka Tamils mainly occupied the subordinate administrative and technical positions in estates, positions they still dominate to this day. Also in the estates are the Malayalis who hold assistant and managerial positions. Few of these estates however are Indian-owned. Indians are also prominent in the transport and communication sector, either as labourers or as administrative and technical staff.

Many Indians are also involved in business and trade, the majority of the privately owned businesses belong to the Chettiars. The Sikhs and other Punjabis were initially recruited by the British to serve in the police and armed forces, and while in modern times these areas are now dominated by Malays, the descendants of Sikhs and other Punjabi are now found in every sphere of the economy, in particular as professionals, and in the mercantile and money-lending business.

Institutionalized racism in economic policy by the government is a key economic challenge for Indians. Many state governments have a no-bin policy which indirectly implies that if a non-Malay applies for anything it will be rejected. According to the Ninth Malaysia Plan report of 2006, Malaysian Indians also controlled only 1.2 percent of the corporate wealth in Malaysia, down from the previous figure of 1.5 percent. Although the Malaysian Indians are estimated at 9% of the population, they own just 2% of the national wealth due to racially discriminatory policies of institutionalized discrimination, such as the NEP.

== Politics ==
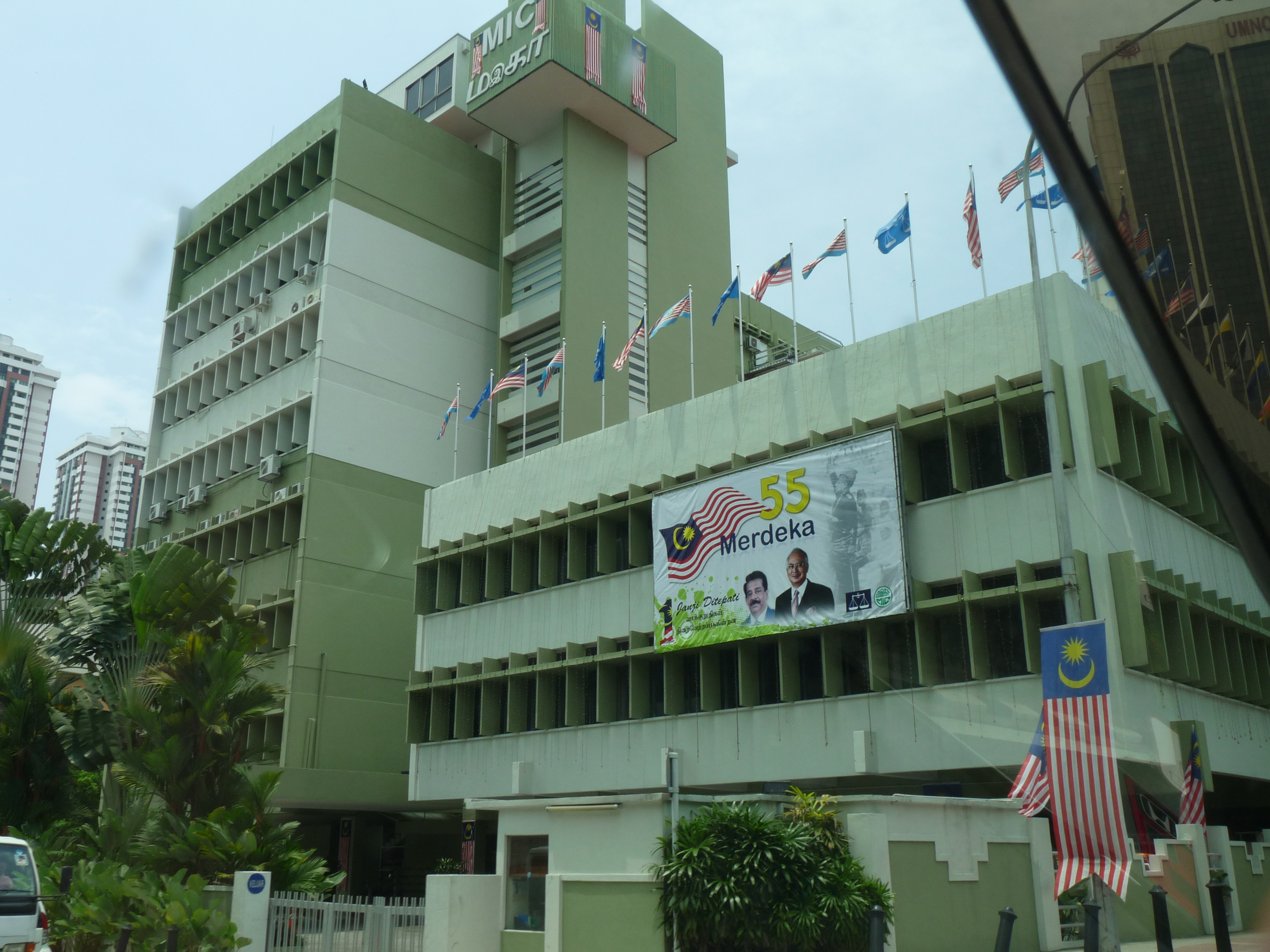
Headquarters of MIC in Kuala Lumpur.

The Malaysian Indian Congress (MIC) is the oldest and largest Indian political party in Malaysia. It is a senior member of the Barisan Nasional coalition. The Indian Progressive Front (IPF), another Indian-based party, is affiliated with Barisan Nasional but is not a formal member. The People's Progressive Party (PPP) is technically a multiracial party but its membership is overwhelmingly Indian. It is a member of the Barisan Nasional. The People's Justice Party (PKR) and Democratic Action Party (DAP) have a large Indian membership and have many Indian lawmakers. Both parties are members of the ruling Pakatan Harapan coalition. The Socialist Party of Malaysia (PSM), a minor opposition party, has a strong Indian presence. The Hindu Rights Action Force (Hindraf) was formed in 2007 to address alleged racial discrimination against Indian Malaysians. It was banned after it staged a large anti-government rally in Kuala Lumpur in 2007. Hindraf's political wing is the Human Rights Party (HRP). The Malaysian Indian Muslim Congress (KIMMA) is a party that represents the interests of the Indian Muslim community. There is the Punjabi Party of Malaysia (PPM) which represents Malaysia's Punjabi community. The Malaysian Ceylonese Congress (MCC) represents Malaysia's Sri Lankan Tamil community who are technically not Indian but often regarded as such by most Malaysians. Other Indian fringe parties include the pro-Barisan Nasional Malaysian Indian United Party (MIUP), Malaysia Makkal Sakti Party (MMSP) and the latest Malaysian Indian Justice Party (MIJP). There was also the Democratic Malaysian Indian Party (DMIP) which has been dissolved.

In the Malaysian general election held in 2018, sixteen Indians were elected to the Dewan Rakyat. This is the highest number of Malaysian Indians elected to parliament in Malaysian history.

HINDRAF was an ally to the Pakatan Harapan government. This is in addition to DAP and PKR which are multiracial parties with Indian representatives. However HINDRAF is dissolved as of 2019 by RoS and currently this ruling is being brought to court for hearing.

Media and the performing arts

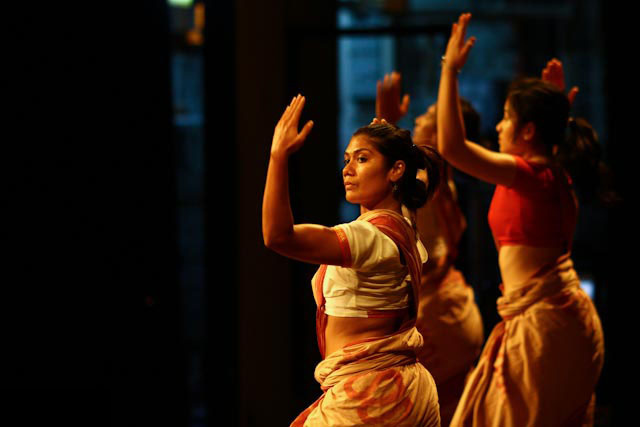
Tamil classical dance, performed in Malaysia.

Satellite television provider Astro provides several Tamil satellite television channels. Astro Vaanavil and state-owned RTM TV2 broadcast locally produced Tamil shows. India-based channels available in Malaysia are Sun TV, Jaya TV, Chutti TV. Thanga Thirai and Velli Thirai are Tamil movie channels while Astro B4U is a Hindi movie channel. The Malaysian Indian community is an important market for the Tamil film industry Kollywood. There are 2-Tamil radio stations of the state-owned Minnal FM and the privately owned THR Raaga.

It is also customary for major Malaysian corporations to produce television commercials in conjunction with Deepavali. They generally pay tribute to the contributions of the Indian community to the nation and are well received by Indians of all faiths. The heart-warming Deepavali commercials by the state petroleum company Petronas are especially popular. Indian Malaysians have also contributed to the mainstream Malaysian entertainment industry. The Jayhawkers from Seremban led by one Joe Chelliah was the first non-Malay pop band with only Indian musicians that recorded popular commercial albums in Malay in the mid 1960s itself. More recent notable Indian Malaysian artists with multiracial appeal are Reshmonu, Jaclyn Victor, and Alleycats. Indian Malaysians have also made significant contributions to the Malaysian English theatre scene. Tamil hip hop was started in Malaysia by pioneers like rappers Chakra Sonic, Yogi B and several others, which had since then made its way to Kollywood.

Bharata Natyam, the Tamil classical dance of India, is an important feature of Tamil culture and is hence popular in Malaysia. Ramli Ibrahim and Mavin Khoo are two non-Indian Malaysians who are Indian classical dance performers. The Temple of Fine Arts in Brickfields, Kuala Lumpur is an academy that provides training in traditional Indian dance and music. The urumee drums are often played at religious and cultural events. The nadaswaram is a traditional Indian wind instrument often played at Indian weddings in Malaysia.

== Cuisine ==
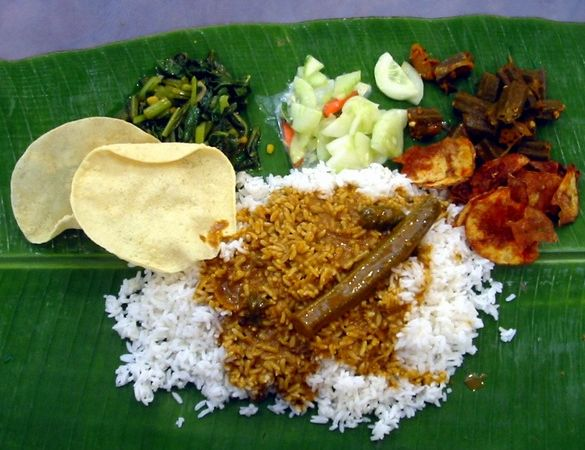
Banana leaf rice.

The contribution of the Indian community to Malaysian cuisine is substantial. Indian cuisine has had a strong influence on traditional Malay cuisine resulting in the popularity of curries in Malaysia. Indian restaurants are well received by Malaysians from all ethnic and religious backgrounds. They have become an important fixture in everyday Malaysian life and are the venue of choice for watching live televised football matches. Mamak restaurants and stalls refer to eateries owned and staffed by Indian Muslims. The word 'Mamak' is sometimes erroneously used to describe any Indian restaurant. Roti canai, nasi kandar, maggi goreng and pasembur (Mamak rojak) are Indian dishes unique to Malaysia. Nasi kandar is sold exclusively in Indian Muslim restaurants and the recipes are closely guarded secrets. Unlike Indian cuisine in the United Kingdom and other Western countries which tend to focus on North Indian cuisine, Indian cuisine in Malaysia is largely based on South Indian cuisine as the Malaysian Indian diaspora is overwhelmingly Tamil, although some northern dishes, such as tandoori chicken and naan bread, are common. Southern breakfast delicacies, such as idli, vadai and dosa (spelled in Malaysia as 'thosai'), are common. The appam is a favourite breakfast dish in Tamil homes. Idiyappam is known as putu mayam in Malay and usually sold by mobile motorcycle vendors. Murukku is made to mark Deepavali. Meals of rice with various vegetable and meat dishes along with other condiments are served on banana leaves in restaurants for lunch and dinner, and also in Indian households during special occasions. Mutton (goat meat) is highly favoured and served as either varuval (dry curry) or peratal (curry with a thick gravy). Fried bitter gourd, banana chips, papadam, rasam, yoghurt and pickles are the usual condiments. Desserts and sweets include payasam, halva, mysore pak, palgoa and ghee balls. Some Indian foods have been widely adopted and localised. This includes but not limited to Murukku, Adhirasam and Puttu.

== Religion ==
Religions of Indian Malaysians
Religion	Percent
Hinduism	86.2%
Christianity	6.0%
Islam	4.1%
Other Religion	1.9%
Buddhism	1.7%
No religion	0.05%
Folk Religion	0.04%
Unknown	0.01%

The Indian community, which mostly consists of Tamils, follows Hinduism as the main faith. Hinduism and Buddhism were brought to the Malay Peninsula from India around the 2nd century AD. The Indian-influenced kingdoms of Kadaram (Old Kedah), and Ilangosagam (Langkasuka) practised Hinduism and Buddhism during the rule of the Malay-Srivijaya and Tamil-Chola kingdoms. The early few Indians arrived and assimilated quickly into the local population through intermarriage.

Hinduism is the most practiced religion amongst the Tamils, including both the major Hindu and Tamil pantheon of deities. Tamils of both Indian and Sri Lankan backgrounds practice Hinduism. Vast majority of the Malayalees and Telugus in Malaysia also practice Hinduism.

Sikhism is practiced mainly by Punjabis. Many Sindhis also worship in Sikh Gurdwaras in Malaysia. Christianity is practiced by a minority of Tamil and Malayali people. In Malaysia, most of the Indian Christians are either Catholic, Pentecostal, Anglican, Methodist, or Lutheran. The majority of the Malayalee Christians are either Catholic or Syrian Christians. Trade contact with the Tamils predate the Islamic period (c. 570-632 AD), or the birth of Islam. Indonesians and Malays learned of Islam initially through Gujarati merchants and further developed on by the Arab traders. Most of the Indian Muslim community has been absorbed into the larger Malay community due to their common religious background, with a substantially high level of assimilation and intermarriage between the communities. In Malaysia, Tamil Muslims are often referred to as 'Mamaks' while Malayalee Muslims are known as 'Kakas' or 'Malabaris'.

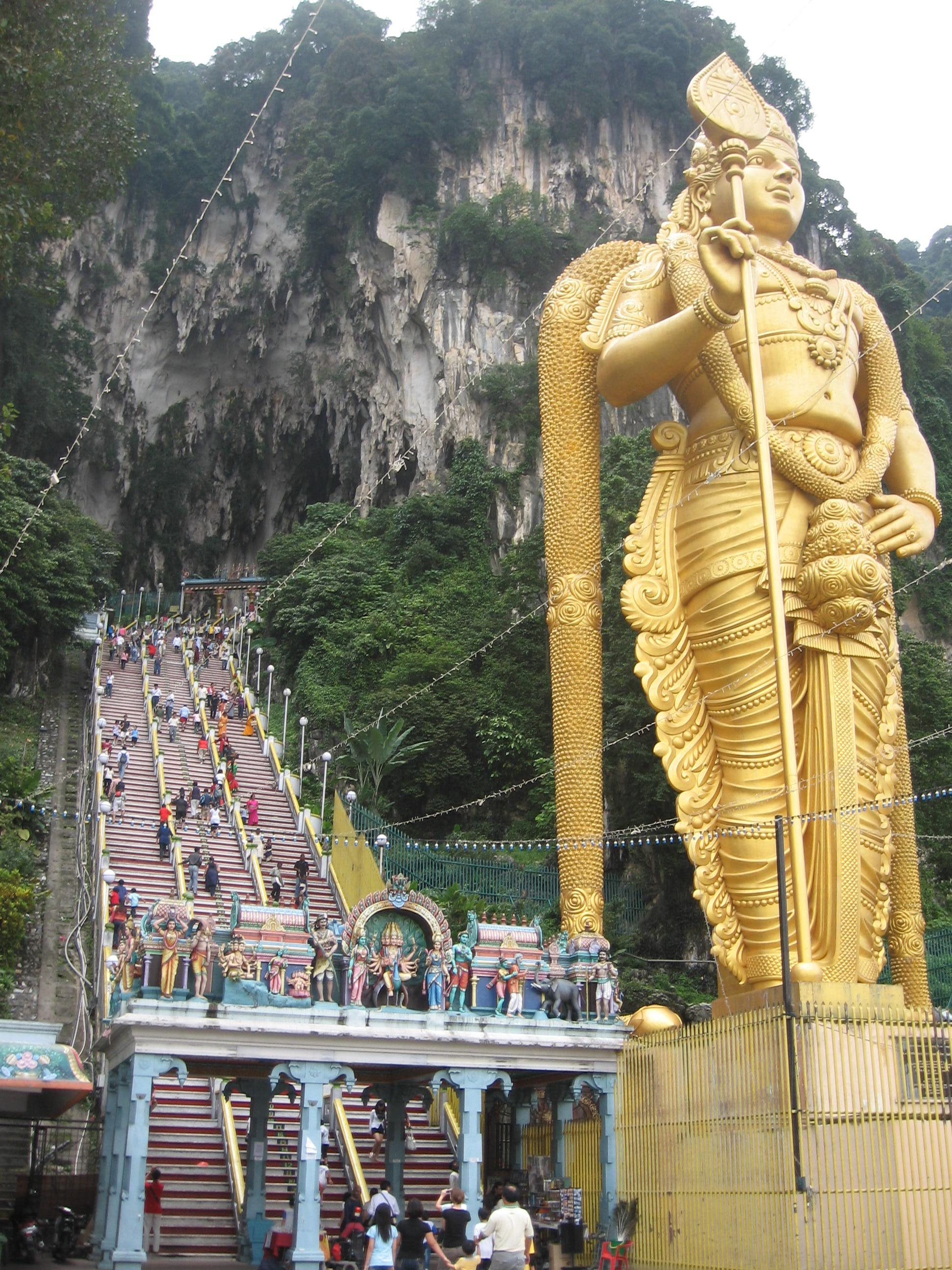
Batu Caves

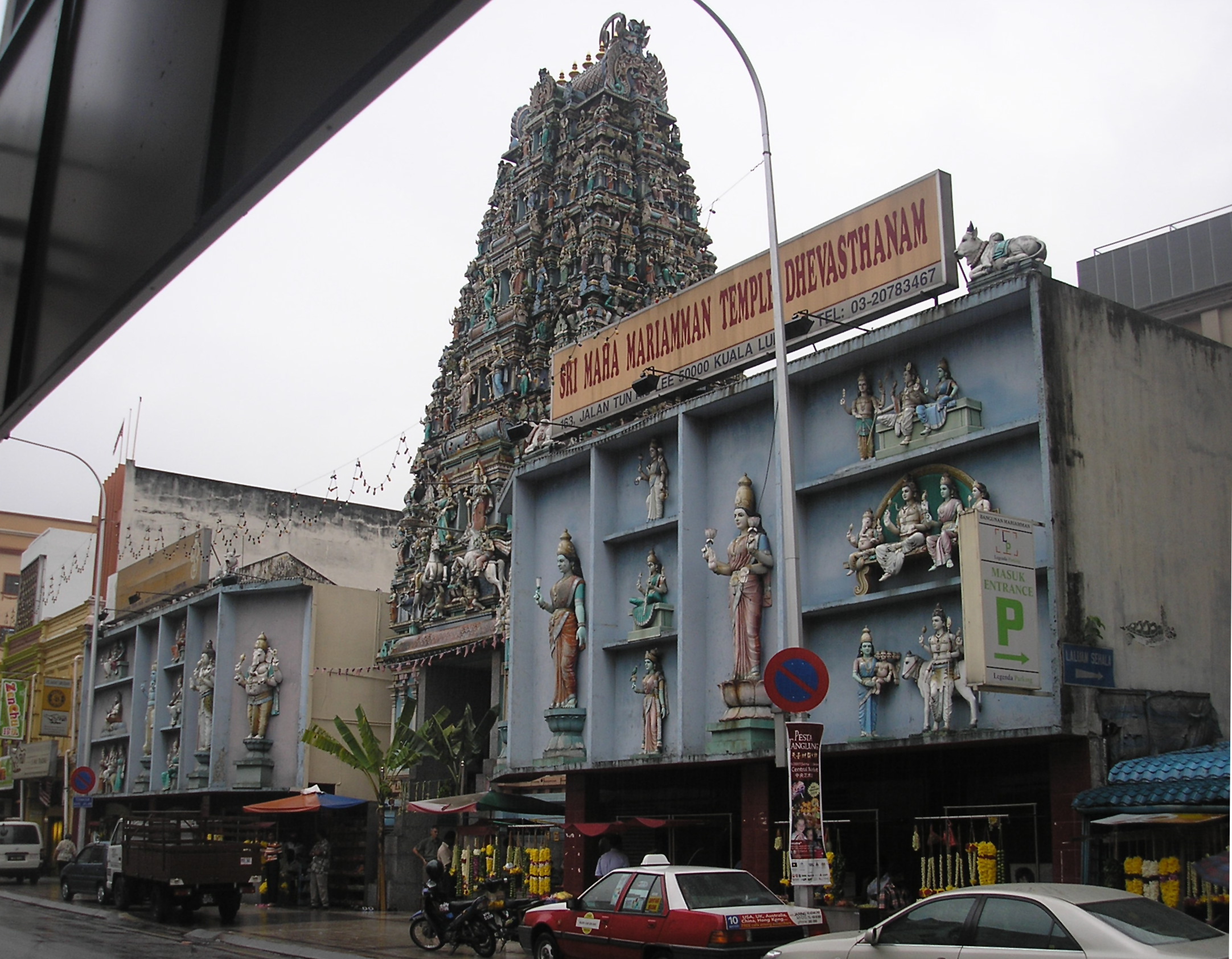
Sri Mahamariamman Temple in Kuala Lumpur

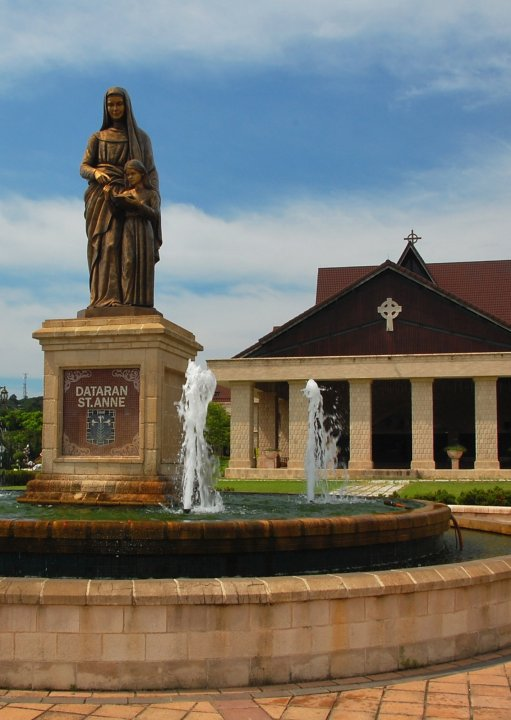
St. Anne's Church in Bukit Mertajam

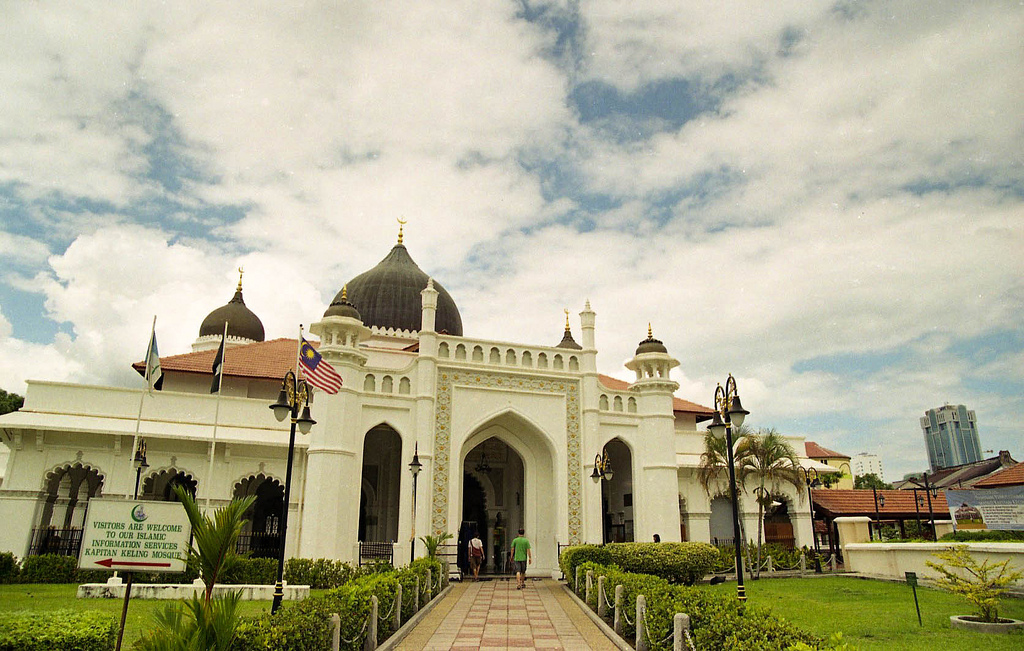
Kapitan Keling Mosque in George Town

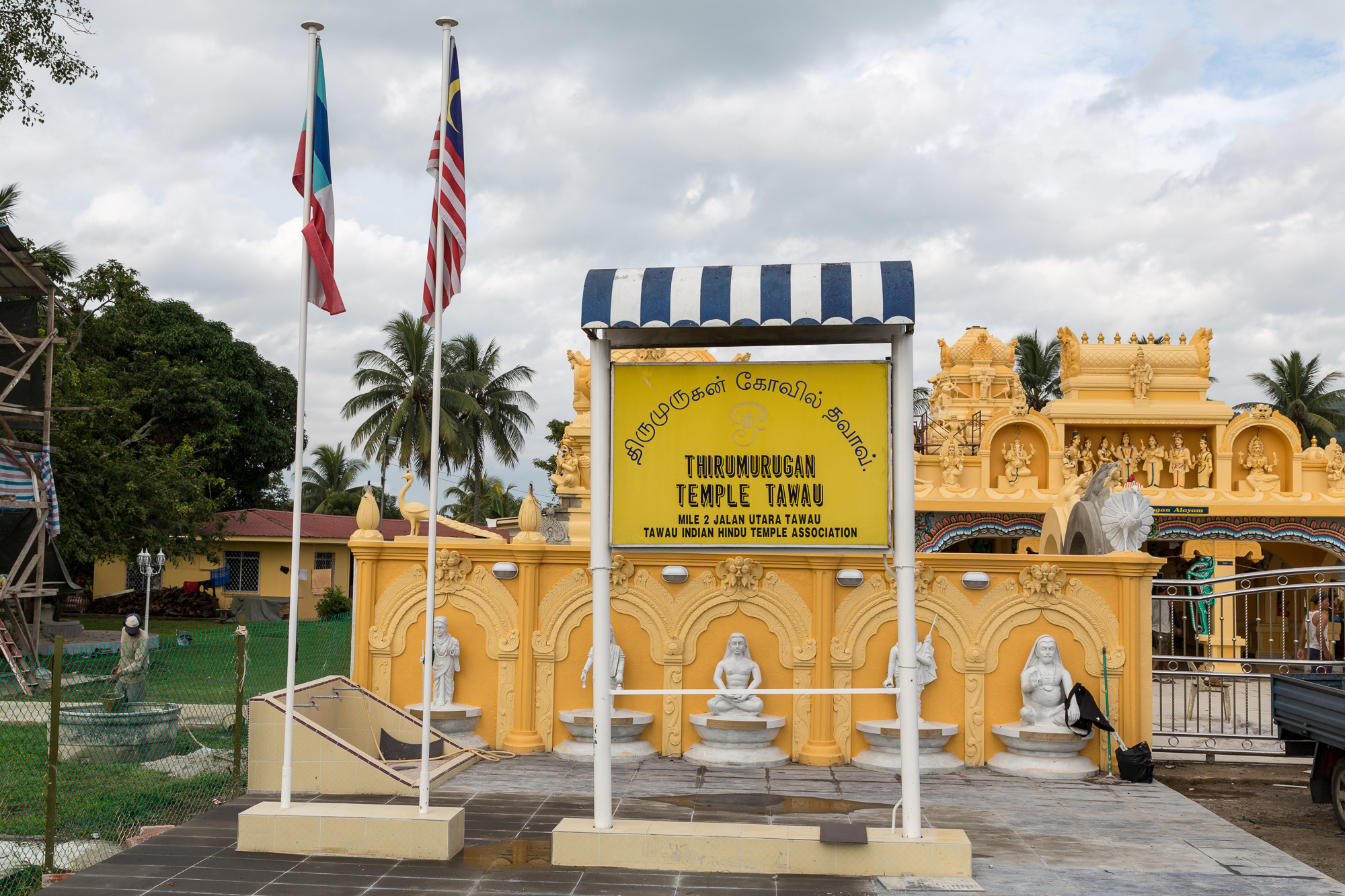
Thirumurugan Temple in Tawau

== Festivals ==
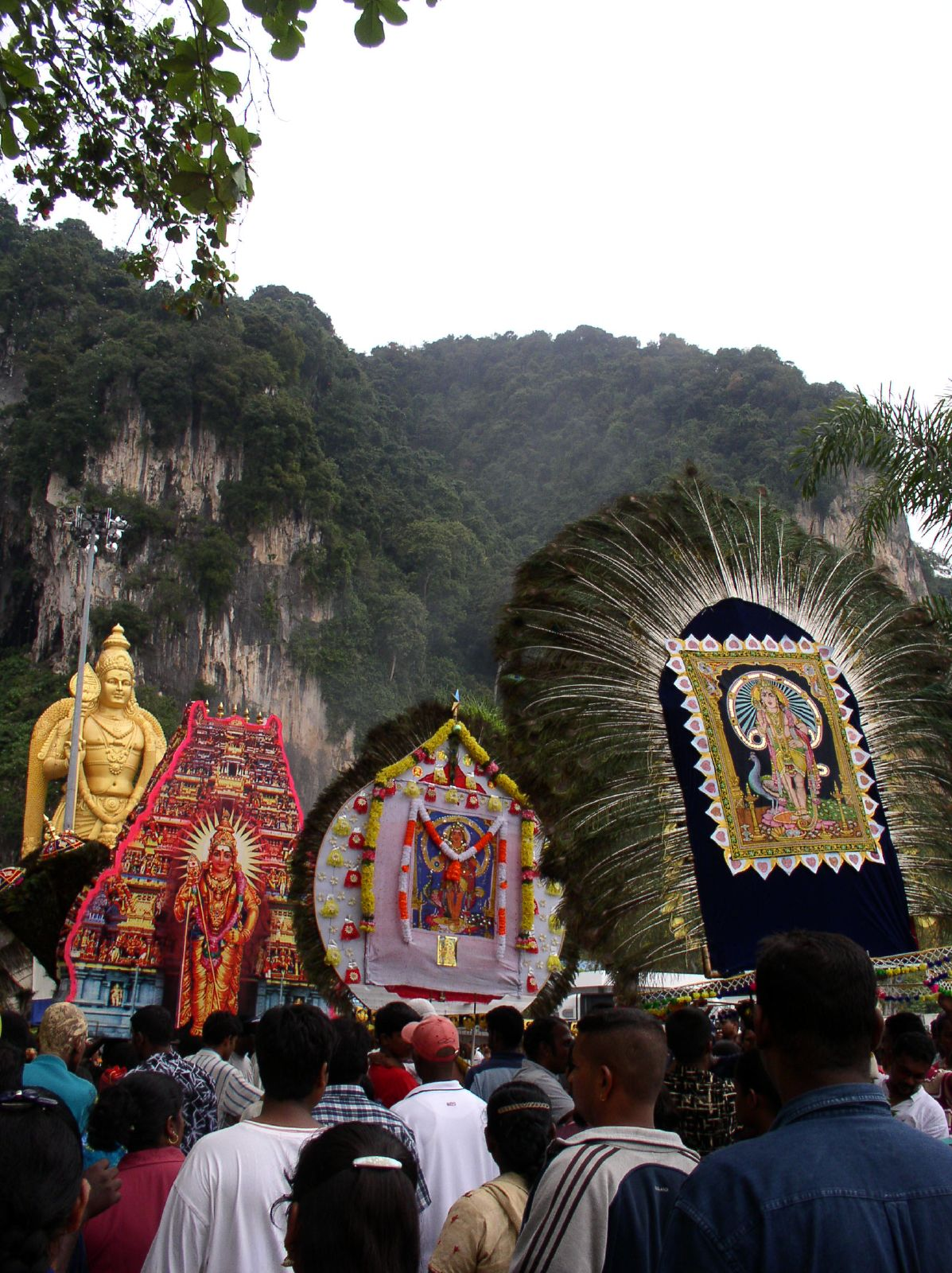
Idols carried in procession during Thaipusam at Batu Caves.

One of the biggest Hindu festivals in Malaysia is Thaipusam. Thaipusam is dedicated to the God Murugan which occurs on the day in the Tamil month of Thai (January–February) when the asterism Poosam is on the ascendant. It is celebrated in grand style in the temples of, George Town, Ipoh and Kuala Lumpur for three days.

In Kuala Lumpur, Thaipusam has become an almost national seat for Poosam celebrations. The venue of the Kuala Lumpur celebrations is a picturesque shrine right inside a cave that lies many feet above the ground, and can only be approached by a steep climb. This place, known as Batu Caves, is about eight miles from the city, and a chariot procession carrying the image of the deity to and from the place adds to the color and gaiety of the festival. Crowds from all over the country throng to the cave, including people of all classes and groups. It is above all a day of penance, on which many vows are fulfilled. A 42.7m high statue of Lord Murugan was built at Batu Caves and was unveiled in January 2006, having taken three years to construct.

One of the most significant rites performed is the carrying of the kavadi, a large wooden decorated arch, as an act of penance. When deities are taken on procession from one shrine to another, they would be followed by a number of these voluntary kavadi-bearers. In other towns and estates, kavadis would be carried for other festivals like Chittirai Paruvam. Some of the more rigid practitioners would bear spikes, spears, and hooks pierced into their bodies. The Chittirai Paruvam festival and festivals to the Tamil deity Mariamman are usually accompanied by a fire-walking ceremony.

Deepavali, popularly known as the 'Festival of Lights', is another major Hindu festival which is celebrated by all Hindu communities. Tamils celebrate Pongal which is a harvest festival usually held from 13–16 January. A similar festival known as Makar Sankranti is celebrated by most other Indian communities while the Punjabis call their harvest festival Lohri.

The Malayalees celebrate Vishu, the Malayalee New Year which usually falls in the month of April or the month of Medam in the Malayalam calendar. Onam is the most popular festival celebrated by the Malayalee community and is usually observed in the month of August or September. They usually prepare Sadhya, a lunch feast consisting of 16 to 24 vegetarian dishes (without onions and garlics).

The Telugus celebrate Ugadi, the Telugu New Year which is based on the lunar calendar; unlike Puthandu, the Tamil New Year and Vasakhi, the Sikh New Year which are based on the solar calendar. Makar Sankranti is an important festival for Telugu community also celebrated as Pongal by Tamils.

The festivals celebrated by Malaysian Indians who profess the Christian faith are Easter, Christmas and All Souls' Day (mainly celebrated by Catholics). Indian Muslims observe Ramadan, the Muslim month of fasting; and celebrate Hari Raya Aidilfitri and Hari Raya Aidiladha.

== Progress ==
=== Timeline ===
- 1873 - Sri Maha Mariamman Temple, Kuala Lumpur was founded by K. Thamboosamy Pillay
- 1920 - Sri Maha Mariamman Temple, Kuala Lumpur initially used as a private shrine opened door to public. This is the oldest functioning Hindu temple in Malaysia
- 1924 - K. Thamboosamy Pillay became the first non-white member of the Royal Selangor Club to attain permanent membership.
- 1946 - Malaysian Indian leaders, including John Thivy, Sardar Booth Singh and MK Ramachandaran Naidu, gathered at the premises of Sri Maha Mariamman Temple in Kuala Lumpur and agreed to form a political party in the interest of the Indian community. John Thivy was elected as the first president in the same year during a national gathering organized by Selangor Indian Association. The party was named Malaya Indian Congress during the first conference that happened on the same year at Chettiar Hall, Sentul, Kuala Lumpur.
- 1951 - Kundan Lal Devaser became the fourth president of Malaya Indian Congress.It was under Devaser's presidency that the MIC joined the Alliance in 1954
- 1953 - Radhakrishna Ramani elected as the 2nd President of Malaysian Bar. He became the first Asian to serve as president of Malaya Bar Council.
- 1955- Tun Sambanthan was elected as the fifth president of Malaya Indian Congress. He is the first Tamil and South Indian to hold the role of president of the party. MIC headquarters was moved to Brickfield (Jalan Tun Sambathan) from Sri MahaMariamman Temple
- 1973 - MIC headquarter ,Menara Manickavasagam was inaugurated by Malaysian 2nd Prime Minister. During that time, the tower was the tallest political party headquarters in Malaysia.
- 1978 - Ganga Nayar become the first female to head a political party in Malaysia after founding the Malaysian Workers' Party. In 1969, upon winning the Serendah state seat, she was also the first woman of Indian descent to be elected to a legislature in Malaysia.
- 1991 - Kamal Bamadhaj, a political science student and human rights activist, was killed in the Dili Massacre in East Timor. He was the only foreign national to be killed when Indonesian troops opened fire on a funeral procession at the Santa Cruz cemetery in Dili.
- 2001 - AIMST University established.
- 2005 - Cecil Rajendra was awarded the first Malaysian Lifetime Humanitarian Award "in recognition of his pioneering legal aid work and exemplary poetry". Also in 2005 he was the first malaysian to be nominated for the Nobel Prize in Literature, which went to Harold Pinter.
- 2005 - Dato Param Cumaraswamy won the Gruber Prize for Justice. The first and only Malaysian to be awarded this international prizes.
- 2007 - 2007 HINDRAF rally held in Kuala Lumpur, Malaysia, on 25 November 2007.The organiser had called the protest over alleged discriminatory policies on Malaysian Indians. Waytha Moorthy Ponnusamy, P. Uthayakumar, Manoharan Malayalam, Vasantha Kumar Krishnan and Ganabatirau Veraman lead the protest.
- 2008 - During 2008 Malaysian general election, Manoharan Malayalam won the Kota Alam Shah state seat while being detained under the Internal Security Act. He became the first person to win an election in Malaysia while in Jail.
- 2015 - Steven Thiru become the 31st President of the Malaysian Bar
- 2016 - Jagat was awarded Best Malaysian Film in 28th Malaysia Film Festival. The film became the first non-Malay language film to win the award and became a landmark achievement in the MFF.
- 2016 - Nisha Ayub awarded International Women of Courage Award. She became the second Malaysian and first transgender to win the award.
- 2018 - Waytha Moorthy Ponnusamy appointed as Minister in the Prime Minister's Department (National Unity and Social Wellbeing). He is the first Indian to serve as Minister in the Prime Minister's Department. He was also the first HINDRAF leader to have achieved a full Minister status in the government cabinet.
- 2018 - Vedigundu Pasangge earned £222 on the first day in United Kingdom. It was the highest opening collection for a movie from Malaysia in the United Kingdom box office
- 2019 - Latheefa Koya, appoint as the 5th Chief Commissioner of the Malaysian Anti-Corruption Commission. She is the first non-Malay to hold this position.
- 2024 - C4 Cinta recorded the highest box office collection at RM2.5 million, making it the highest-grossing local Tamil film

== Influence on Malaysian culture ==
Indian influences can be seen on modern Malaysia as well as on traditional Malay culture. The diffusion of Indian culture includes the following:

- Malay folklore contains a rich number of Indian-influenced mythological characters, such as Bidadari, Jentayu, Garuda and Naga.
- Early Malay literature was highly influenced by Indian epics, such as the Mahabharata and the Ramayana.
- Wayang shadow puppets and classical dance-dramas of Malaysia took stories from episodes of Ramayana and Mahabharata.

=== Language and names ===
A good number of Tamil inscriptions as well as Hindu and Buddhist icons emanating from South India have been found in Southeast Asia (and even in parts of south China). On the Malay Peninsula, inscriptions have been found at Takuapa, not far from the Vishnuite statues of Khao Phra Narai in Southern Thailand. It is a short inscription indicating that an artificial lake named Avani-naranam was dug by nangur-Udaiyan which is the name of an individual who possessed a military fief at Nangur, being famous for his abilities as a warrior, and that the lake was placed under the protection of the members of the Manikkiramam (which according to K.A. Nilakanta Sastri, was a merchant guild) living in the military camp.

An inscription dated 779 AD has been found in Ligor, Malay Peninsula. This refers to the trade relationship between the Tamil country and Malaya. In ancient Kedah there is an inscription found by Dr. Quaritch Wales. It is an inscribed stone bar, rectangular in shape, bears the ye-dharmma formula in South Indian characters of the 4th century AD, thus proclaiming the Buddhist character of the shrine near the find-spot (site I) of which only the basement survives. The inscriptions are on three faces in Pallava Grantha script. The Ruler Raja Ganga fled from his empire into the forests with his queen and an infant heir. Raja Ganga left traces of hideout on a nearby hill in form of artefacts on stones. All these inscriptions, both Tamil and Sanskrit ones, relate to the activities of the people and rulers of the Tamil country of South India. The Tamil inscriptions are at least four centuries posterior to the Sanskrit inscriptions, from which the early Tamils themselves were patronizers of the Sanskrit language. The Cherok Tokun Ancient Inscriptions were first documented by Colonel James Low, a British army officer, in 1845. In his log, Low recorded his disappointment of not finding a more spectacular ruin, expecting to find an ancient temple ruin. He documented what he made out to be "a group of seven inscriptions". The inscriptions were believed to be in pre-Pallava script and written in Sanskrit. They were attributed to the ancient Kingdom of Kadaaram, which flourished in northern Malaysia in the 5th to 6th centuries. However, according to J Laidlay, who translated the text in 1848, the inscription was in fact written in Pali - another ancient language of the Indian subcontinent.

An element needed to carry out commercial transactions is a common language understood by all parties involved in early trade. Historians such as J.V. Sebastian, K.T. Thirunavukkarasu, and A.W. Hamilton record that Tamil was the common language of commerce in Malaysia and Indonesia during historical times. The maritime Tamil significance in Sumatran and Malay Peninsula trading continued for centuries and borrowings into Malay from Tamil increased between the 15th and 19th centuries due to their commercial activities. In the 17th century, the Dutch East India Company was obliged to use Tamil as part of its correspondence. In Malacca and other seaports up to the 19th century, Malay terminology pertaining to book-keeping and accountancy was still largely Tamil.

Tamil	Malay	English
Kadai (கடை)	kedai	shop
Kappal (கப்பல்)	kapal	ship
Vagai (வகை)	bagai	variety/ like
Toppi (தொப்பி)	topi	hat

=== Infrastructure ===
Indians have contributed significantly to the building of Malaysia since the 19th century. The Indian workforce was instrumental in the clearing of land for infrastructure, established rubber plantations, built the roads, set up transmission lines as well as managed early Malayan railways, ports and airports. Indian doctors, chemists and veterinarians formed the bulk of medical personnel in Malaysia - their contributions still persist to present day. Indian civil servants formed the core of the civil service both pre- and post-independence. Indian teachers who were particularly fluent in the English language formed the backbone of Malaysian education, particularly in missionary schools. Indians also pioneered private education in Malaysia.

== Diaspora ==
A number of Malaysian Indian immigrants are found in Australia, and they tended to be highly qualified and speak English fluently and were therefore highly employable. There is also a small community of Australians of Indian descent on the Australian external territory of Christmas Island who live alongside other Australians of ethnic Malaysian Chinese, Malay and European descent.

== Notable people ==
Among the notable people of Indian descent in Malaysia are K. Thamboosamy Pillay, a prominent figure of early Kuala Lumpur, and Karpal Singh, V. David and Samy Vellu, all prominent Malaysian Indian politicians.

== Challenges for the future ==
Institutionalized racism and discrimination in government policy such as NEP had an adverse impact on non-Malays including the Malaysian Indian minority in Malaysia. Despite the fact that the average income of Malaysian Indians exceeds that of their Malay counterparts, there exists a substantial portion of the community who are poor, with 40% of Malaysian Indians claimed to be at the bottom rung of the income ladder. Despite the obvious need of the poor, Malaysian Indians are not eligible for any of Malaysia's affirmative-action programmes, which are reserved for Malays and select indigenous people. Ramon Navaratnam argued the NEP needs to be reformed as it is outdated, and should be replaced with a system that can help close the gap of poverty regardless of race and religion.

Further challenges faced by the Indian community is religious conflict due to increasing Islamisation, and there were communal clashes between Indians and Malays such as the 2001 Kampung Medan riots, as well as protest over racial discrimination and temple demolitions during the 2007 HINDRAF rally. These factors in part have resulted in the migration of many highly skilled Malaysian Indians abroad, where Indian migrants are largely upwardly mobile. A survey in 2017 found that 42% of Malaysian Indians who had completed their secondary or tertiary education wanted to emigrate.
