= K. Thamboosamy Pillay =

Malaysian businessman

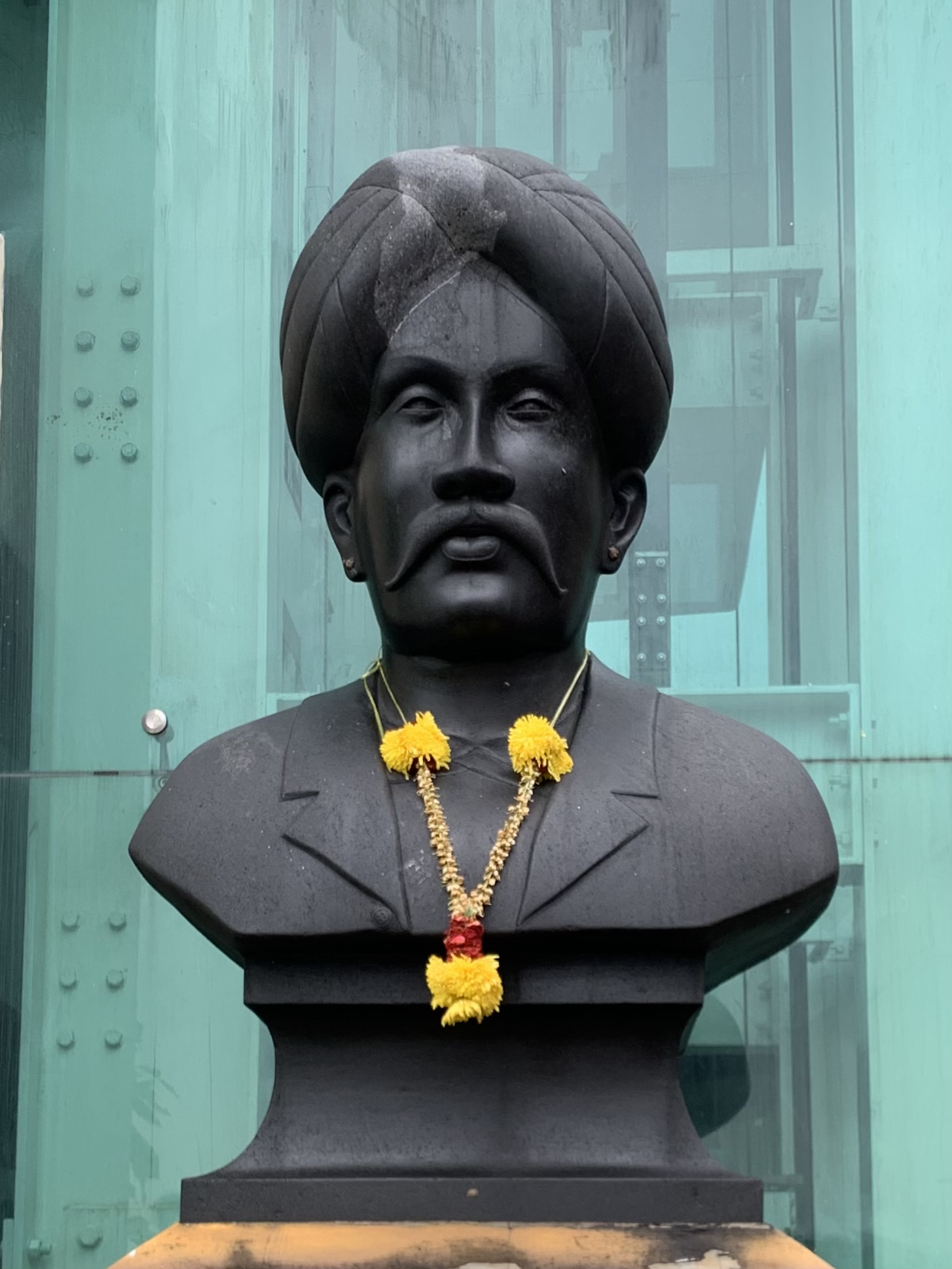
Bust of K. Thamboosamy Pillay at Batu Caves

K. Thamboosamy Pillay (Tamil: தம்புசாமி பிள்ளை, 1850—1902) was a prominent Malaysian of Indian Tamil origin during the pre-independence years. He was considered the leader of the Tamil community. He was a wealthy businessman, tin miner, moneylender and government contractor.

Thamboosamy was one of the founders and one of the original Trustees of Victoria Institution as well as the founder of the Sri Mahamariamman Temple, Kuala Lumpur.

== Background ==
Born in Singapore in 1850, K. Thamboosamy Pillay received his early education at Raffles Institution. He sailed to Klang in 1875 with James Guthrie Davidson, when the latter was appointed Malaya's first British Resident. Prior to that, he had been a clerk in the legal firm in which Davidson was a partner.

He was later transferred to the Treasury where he eventually became chief clerk and acted as State Treasurer on a few occasions. He was sent to British India by the Malayan Government to bring over the first batch of Indian immigrants for the Railway and Public Works. Thamboosamy resigned from Government service in the 1880s and, going into partnership with towkay Loke Yew, managed the New Tin Mining Company in Rawang. They were the first to use electric pumps for mining in Malaya.

A Justice of Peace and member of the prestigious KL Sanitary Board, Thamboosamy was the acknowledged leader of the Tamil community. His other business interests included coffee planting, real estate and construction. He constructed part of the main road from Kuala Lumpur to Kuala Kubu. He was a member of both the Selangor Club and the Turf Club and owned several horses.

Thamboosamy died in 1902 in Singapore, where he had gone to attend a meeting at the Singapore Turf Club.

== Contributions ==
A Justice of Peace and member of the prestigious KL Sanitary Board, Thamboosamy was the acknowledged leader of the Indian community in Malaya, especially in Kuala Lumpur.

Thamboosamy was one of the founders and one of the original Trustees of Victoria Institution. One of the sports houses in VI is named after him. His son, K. T. Ganapathy Pillay, was a Victorian and served as the second President of the VIOBA.

=== Religion ===
The Sri Mahamariamman Temple, Kuala Lumpur was founded by Thamboosamy in 1873 and was initially used as a private shrine by the Pillai family. The family threw open the temple doors to the public in the late 1920s and eventually handed the management of the temple over to a board of trustees.

This is the oldest functioning Hindu temple in Malaysia. It is also reputed to be the richest in the country. The Temple was originally sited somewhere near the Kuala Lumpur Railway Station. It shifted to its present location along Jalan Tun H.S. Lee (next to KL's Chinatown) in 1885.

He also founded the Subramanian Swamy temple in Batu Caves. The vel-shaped entrance of the largest cave is said to have inspired him to build the Hindu temple in devotion to Lord Muruga.

So great was Thamboosamy's philanthropic spirit, that he donated money to whoever needed it, regardless of race or religion. He contributed a sizeable amount of money to the building fund of St. Mary's Cathedral, Kuala Lumpur in 1893, despite being a Hindu.

== Awards and recognition ==
A street in the Chow Kit district and a Tamil primary school in Sentul are also named in his memory.
