= Petaling Street =

Road and neighborhood in Kuala Lumpur, Malaysia

Coordinates: 3°08′40″N 101°41′51″E

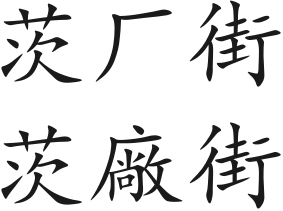
- Petaling Street in Simplified Chinese (top) and Traditional Chinese character (below)
- Traditional Chinese: 茨廠街
- Simplified Chinese: 茨厂街
Transcriptions
Standard Mandarin
- Hanyu Pinyin: Cíchǎng Jiē
Yue: Cantonese
- Jyutping: ci^{4} cong^{2} gaai^{1}

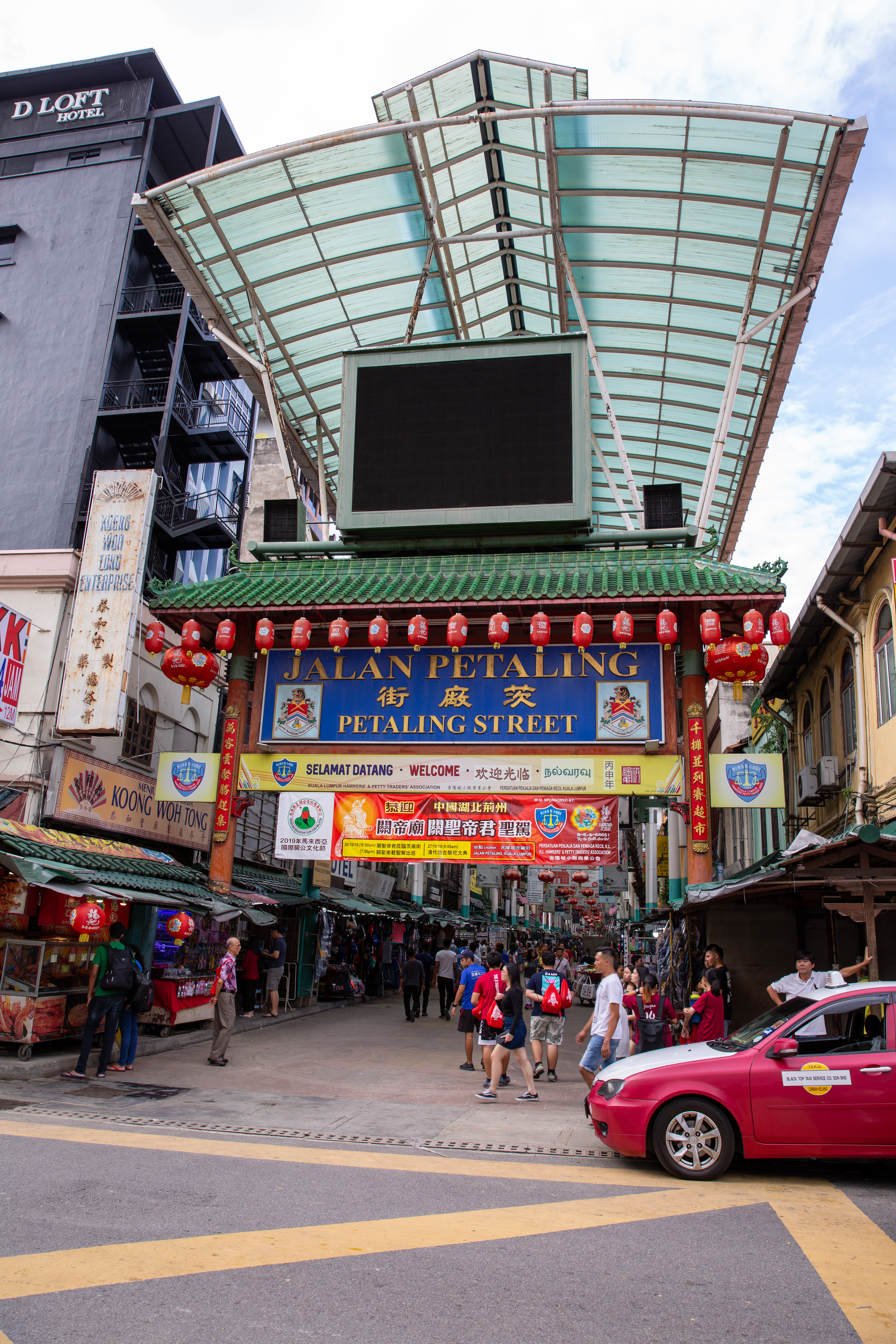
Petaling Street in 2019

Petaling Street (Malay: Jalan Petaling, Simplified Chinese: 茨厂街, Traditional Chinese: 茨廠街, pinyin: Cíchǎng Jiē, Cantonese Jyutping: ci^{4} cong^{2} gaai^{1}) is a Chinatown located in Kuala Lumpur, Malaysia. The vicinity is also known as Chinatown KL. Haggling is a common sight here, and the place is usually crowded with locals, as well as tourists.

The area has dozens of restaurants and food stalls, serving local favourites such as Hokkien mee, Ikan Bakar (barbecued fish), asam laksa and curry noodles. Reggae Bar Chinatown is located here. Traders here are mainly Chinese but there are also Indian, Malay, and Bangladeshi traders. It is also known for street prostitution.

== History and development ==
Map

The original Chinatown is centred on Market Square, Jalan Tun H.S. Lee (or High Street). The High Street was popular as it was higher than the rest of the town and thus less prone to floods. This led the wealthier population to build their shophouses here. As a result, the more ornate shophouses were built north of Jalan Cheng Lock and closer to the High Street business centre.

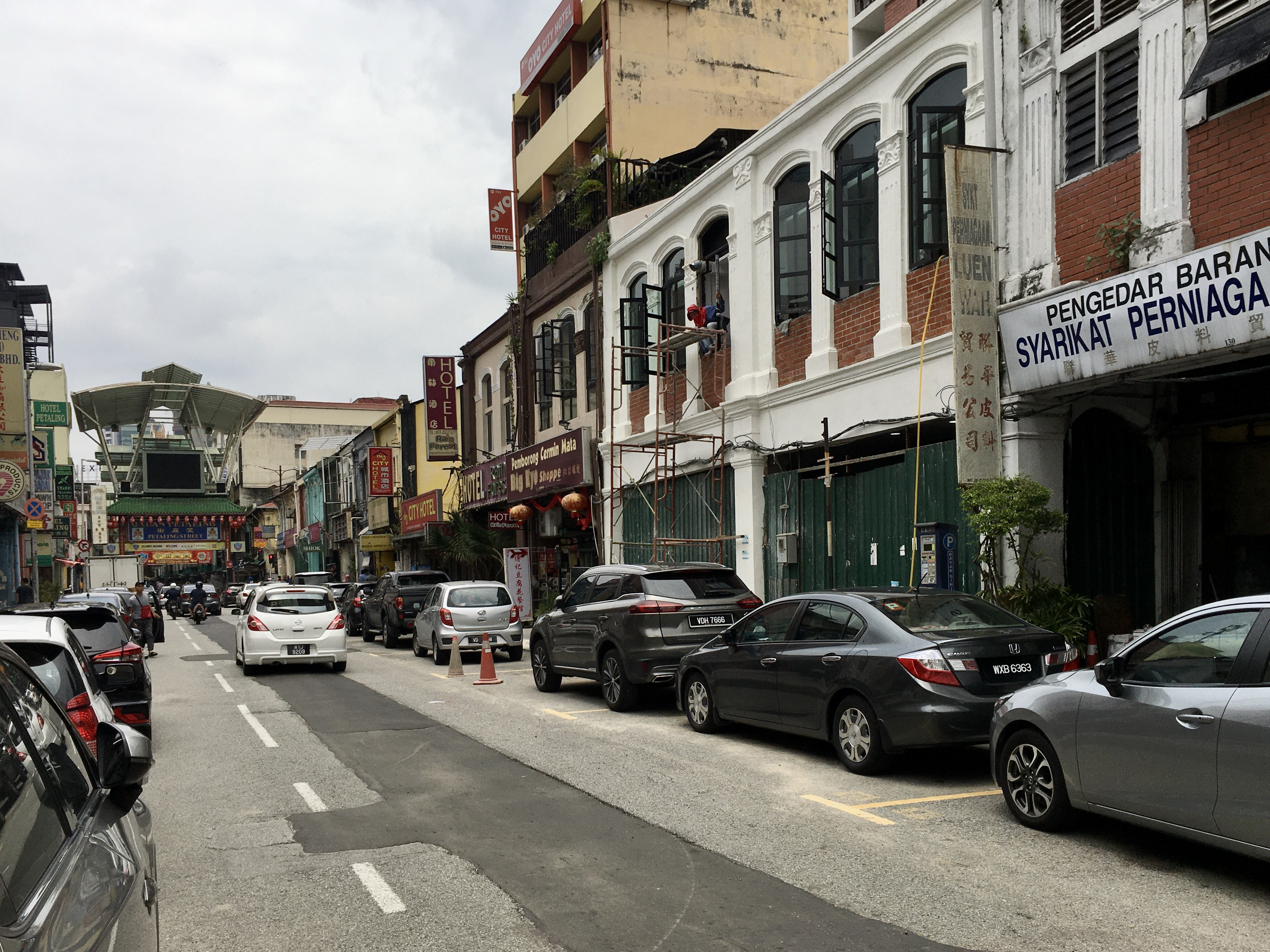
Road leading to Kuala Lumpur's Chinatown from the south side of Petaling Street

Kuala Lumpur was a typical "pioneer" town around the start of the 20th century. The population was predominantly male, and they were typical of the rough and tough pioneers of those times. The men were mainly Cantonese and Hakkas who had come to the city because of the tin trade, working as coolies in the mines. They were governed by a Chinese Kapitan or headman. The most famous Chinese Kapitan was Yap Ah Loy, a Hakka.

In the 1860s to 1870s, the Selangor Civil War erupted between rival Malay factions, as well as within the Chinese community that were allied to them. The Chinese community split along partisan lines between the Hokkien Ghee Hin and the Hakka Hai San secret societies. When the British authorities realised that the war disrupted their economy and supply chains, they decided to enter the war. As a result, many buildings were destroyed or severely damaged.

During the civil war, the tin mines were abandoned. The neglect during this time caused them to become flooded. After the war (and when the miners returned), they found that the mines were now unworkable due to flooding. Yap Ah Loy persuaded the miners and coolies to remain in KL and persuaded the Malays in the surrounding districts to grow rice and other garden products. He opened a tapioca mill in Petaling Street where the tubers from his farms were brought to be ground into flour. Petaling Street is called 'Chee Cheong Kai' in Cantonese, meaning Starch Factory Street.

== Features ==
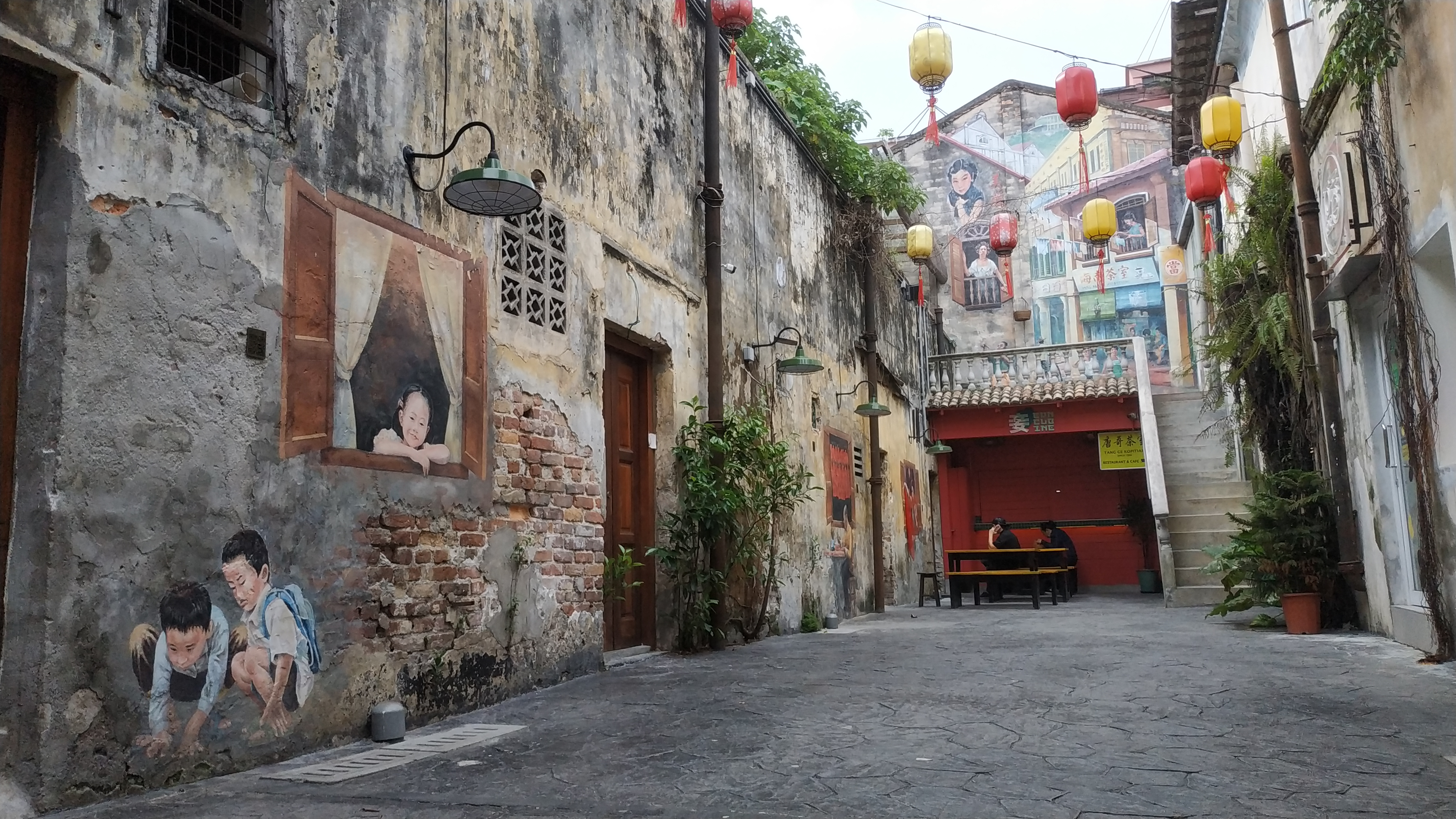
Kwai Chai Hong is home to many beautiful murals which depict the historic life surrounding Chinatown

There used to be a McDonald's on the 1st shop lot of Petaling Street (facing Foch Avenue (Jalan Tun Tan Cheng Lock)) before it ceased operations several years ago. Nearby is a Chinese bookstore, as well as food stalls selling a variety of local food like Hainanese chicken rice and noodles. One famous Wanton Noodle shop, called Koon Kee Too, is located near the intersection inside Petaling Street. Also nearby are the Jamek Mosque, an old mosque of Moorish architecture, as well as the Central Market, all accessible within walking distance.

One of Kuala Lumpur's famous landmarks, the Sri Mahamariamman Temple, Kuala Lumpur, is located along with Jalan Tun H.S. Lee. It is one of KL's oldest and richest Hindu temples, attracting many devotees and tourists daily.

Another notable landmark within the area is Kwai Chai Hong (Chinese: 鬼仔巷) located along Lorong Panggung. It is a back alley behind the shophouses with lots of mural arts managed by Bai Chuan Management Sdn Bhd to make use as a tourist attraction. The name translates literally as Little Ghost Lane or Little Demon Lane in English. The alley features 6 artistic interactive murals with QR codes placed on the walls of each mural about historic life of residents around the block back in the days.

== Development ==
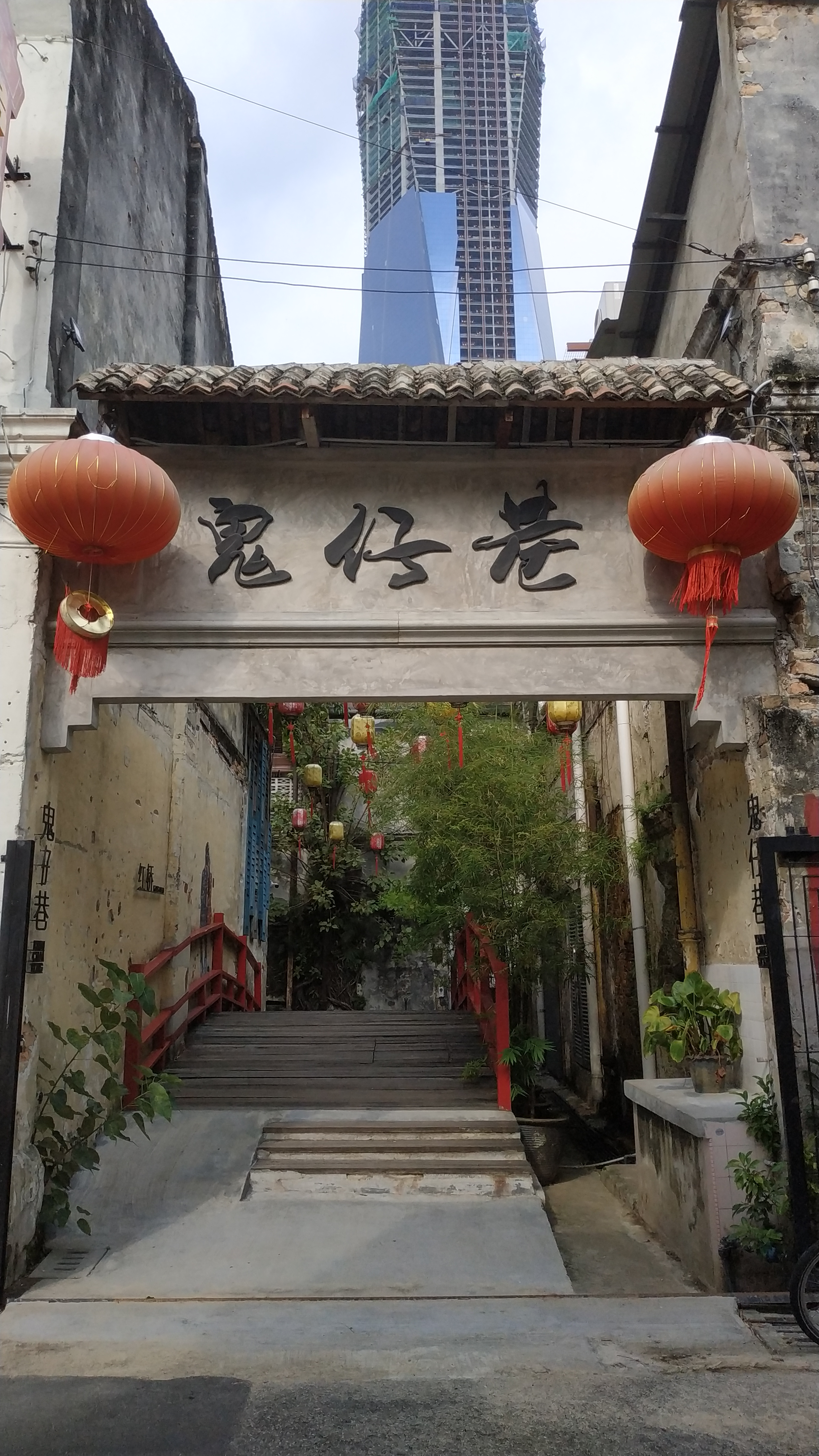
The entrance arch of Kwai Chai Hong in 2020

In 2003, Petaling Street underwent a major RM11 million facelift when two large Chinese arches to welcome visitors were placed at either end of the street. A green roof cover was constructed, covering the whole road, dubbed the "Green Dragon". The street is now totally pedestrianised and transformed into a pedestrian shopping mall. The Street is regarded as a heritage site.

== Film ==
Although not shot on site, Malaysia's 2011 kungfu comedy film, Petaling Street Warriors, is set against the backdrop of Petaling Street in the year 1908.

== Transportation ==
The street is accessible within walking distance from the following rail stations:

- Northwest from Plaza Rakyat LRT station (interchange with Merdeka MRT station);
- South from Masjid Jamek LRT station;
- Northeast from Pasar Seni LRT/MRT station – connected to KTM Kuala Lumpur; and
- North from Maharajalela Monorail station.

== Image gallery ==
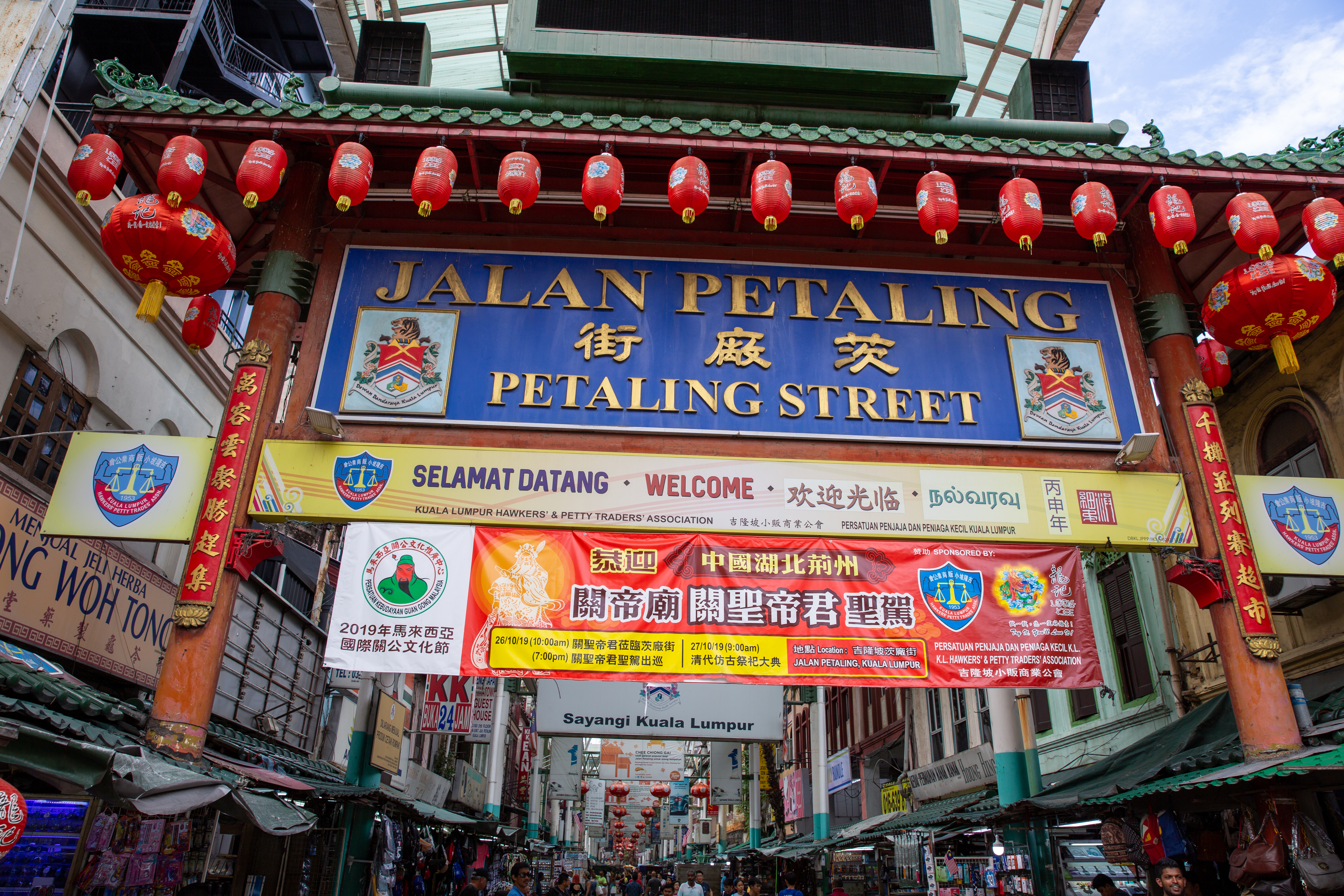
Closeup view of the iconic Petaling Street Gate

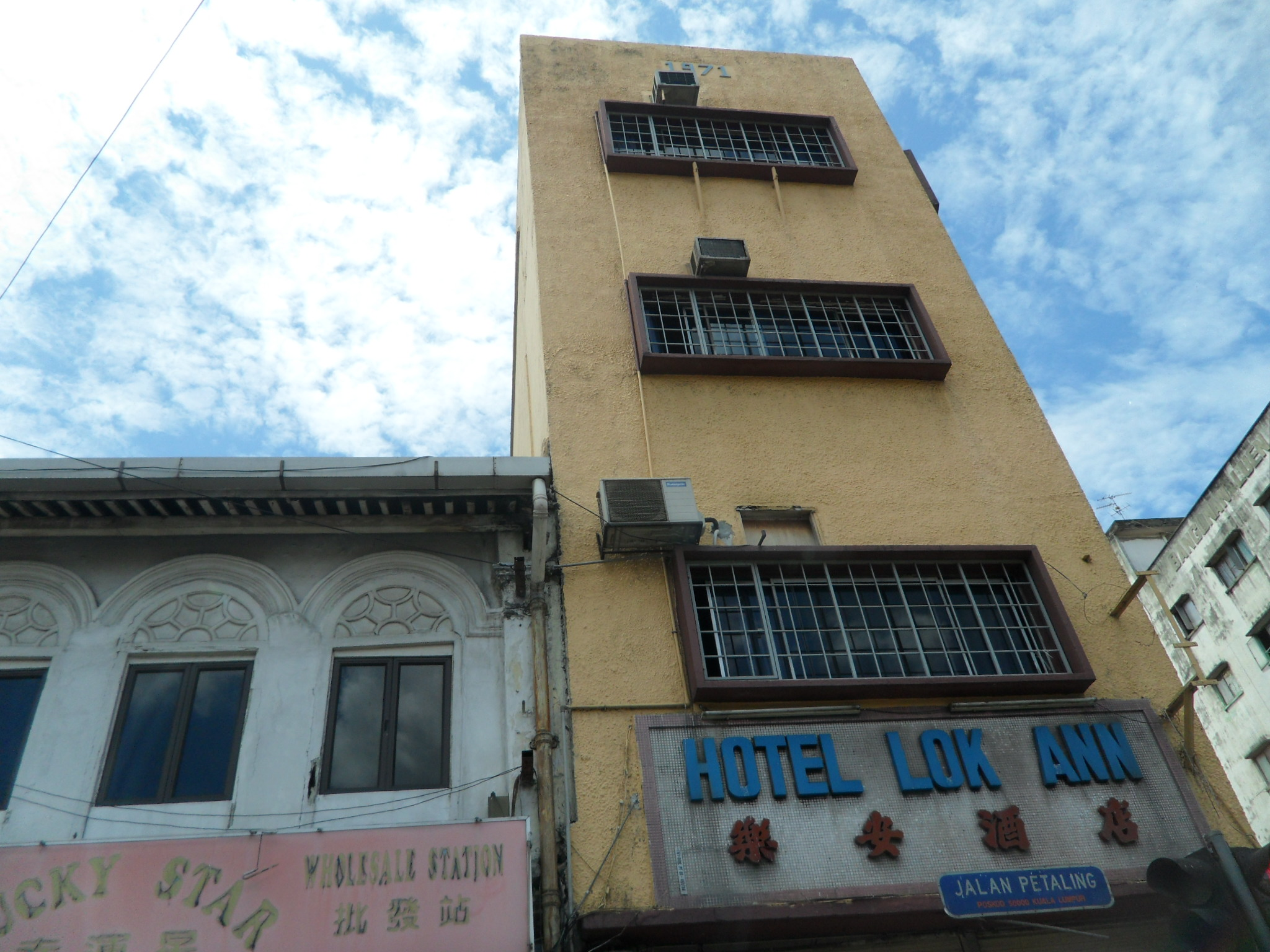
Hotel Lok Ann, located opposite the entrance

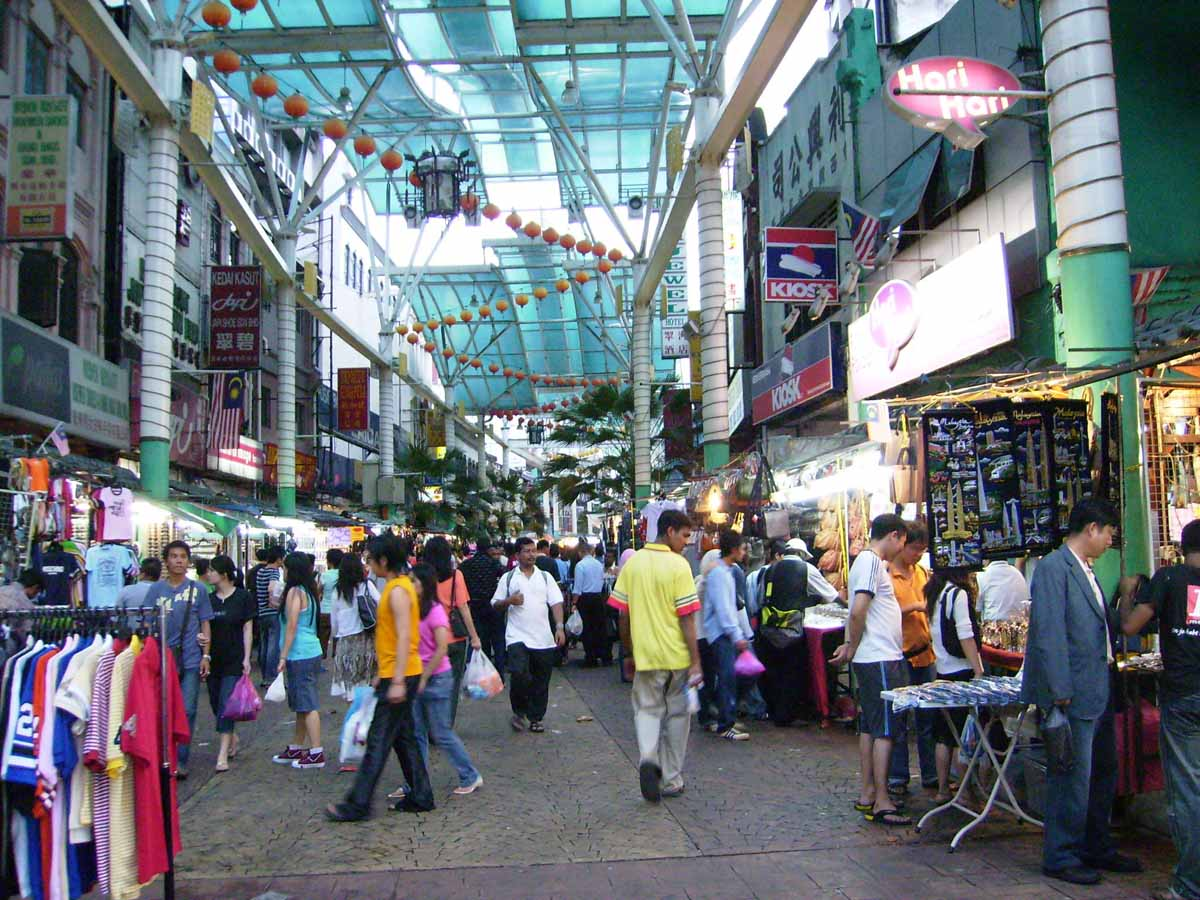
Row of shops and hawkers underneath the "Green Dragon"

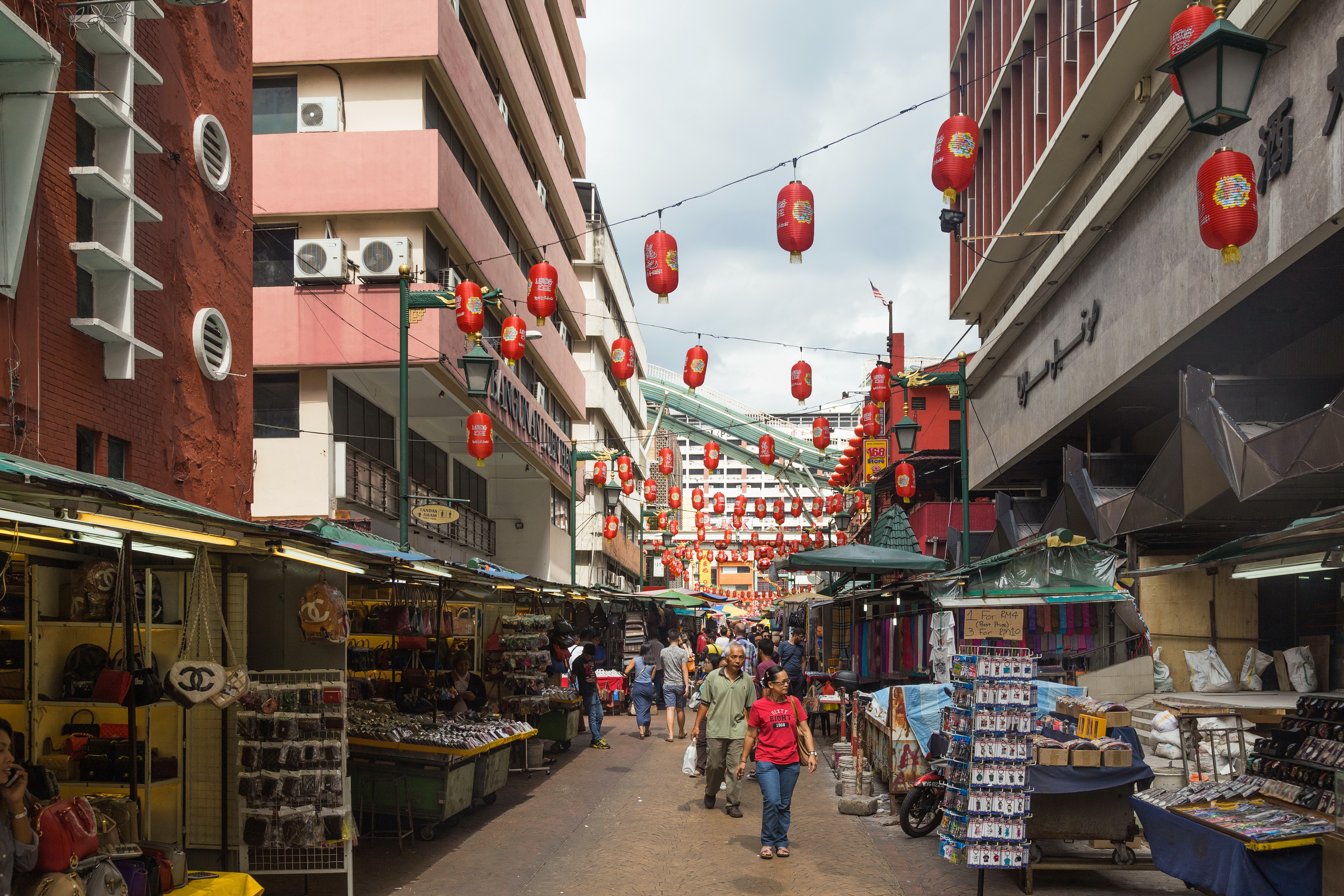
Petaling Street side entrance from Jalan Hang Lekir

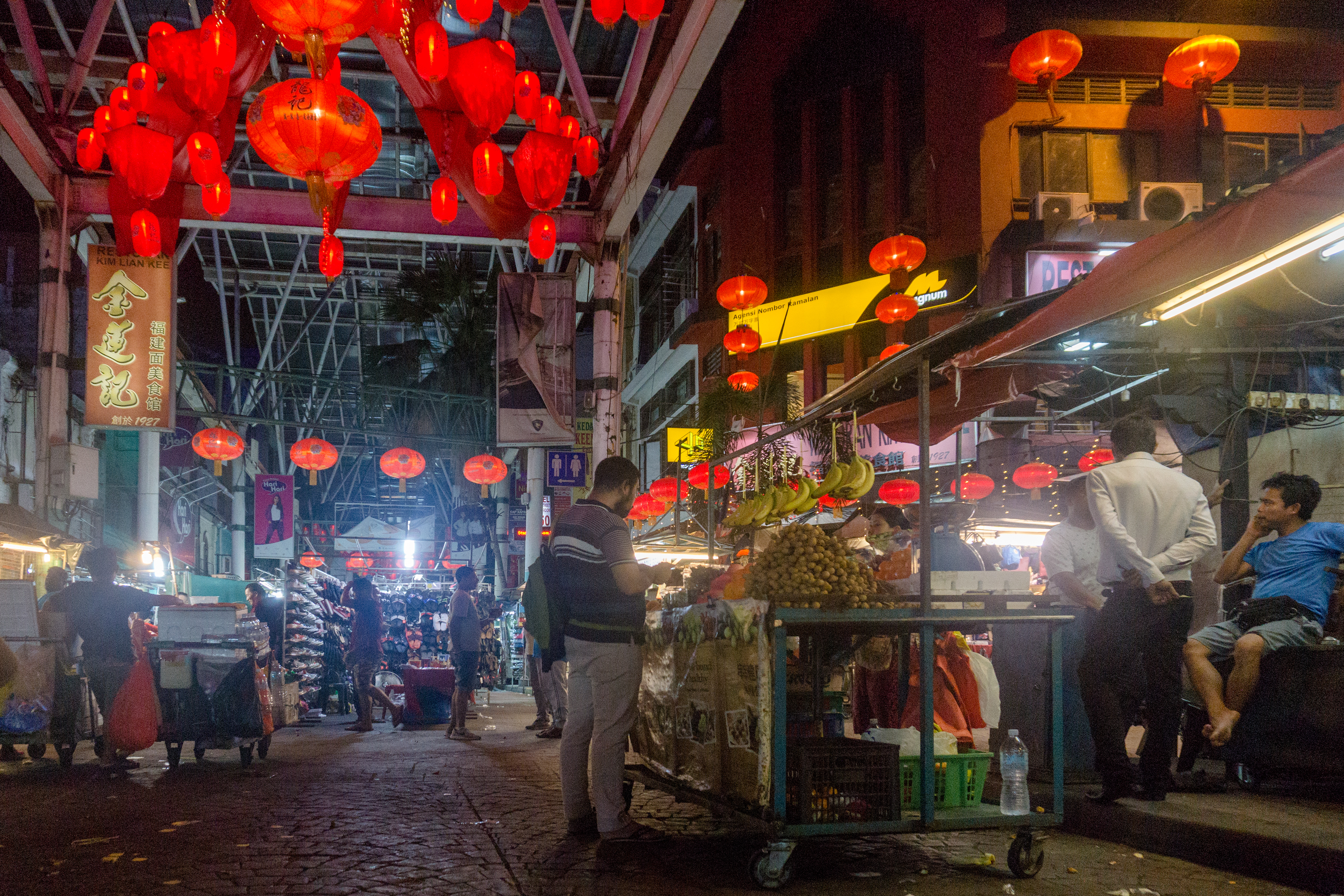
Petaling Street at night

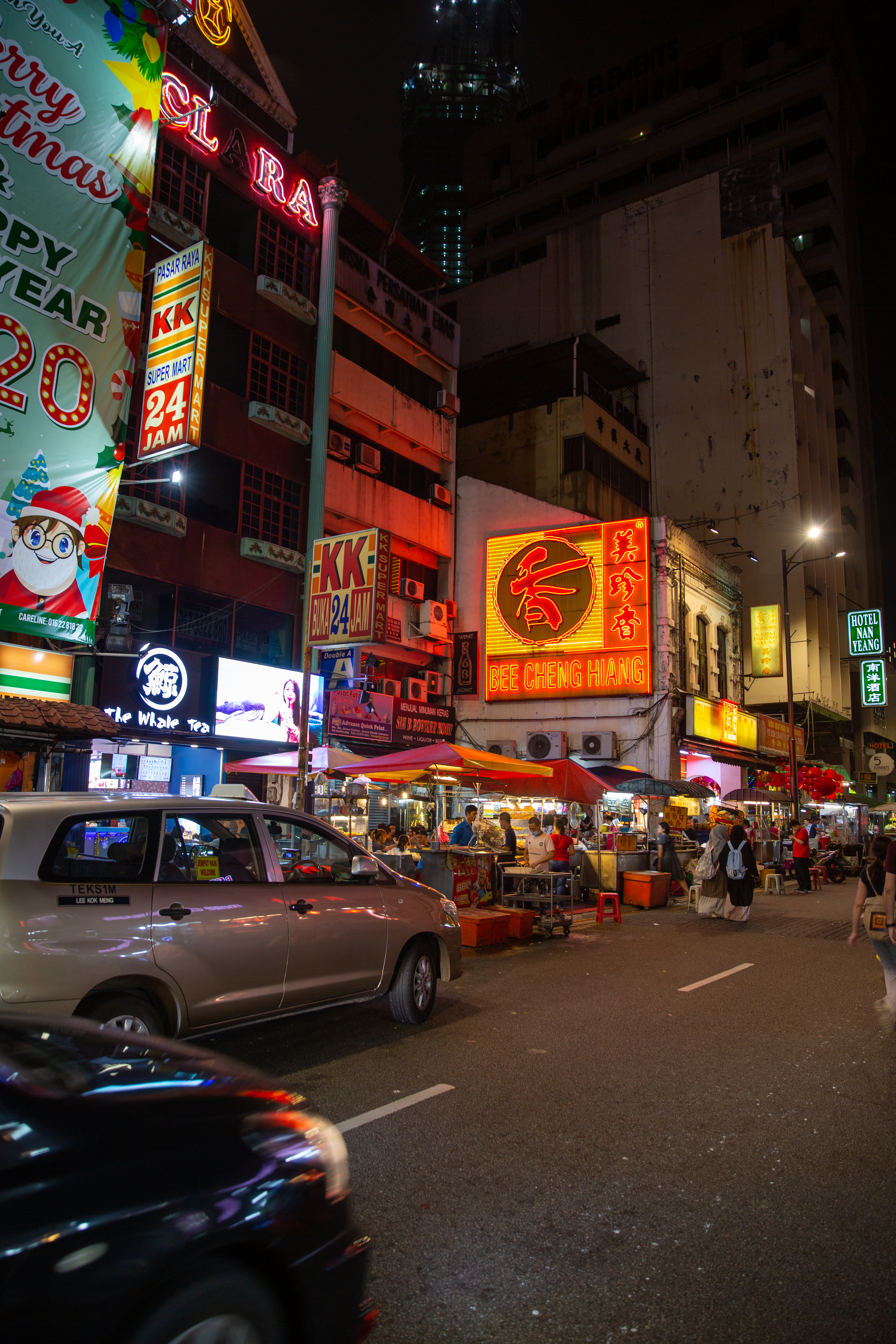
Hawker stalls during the night

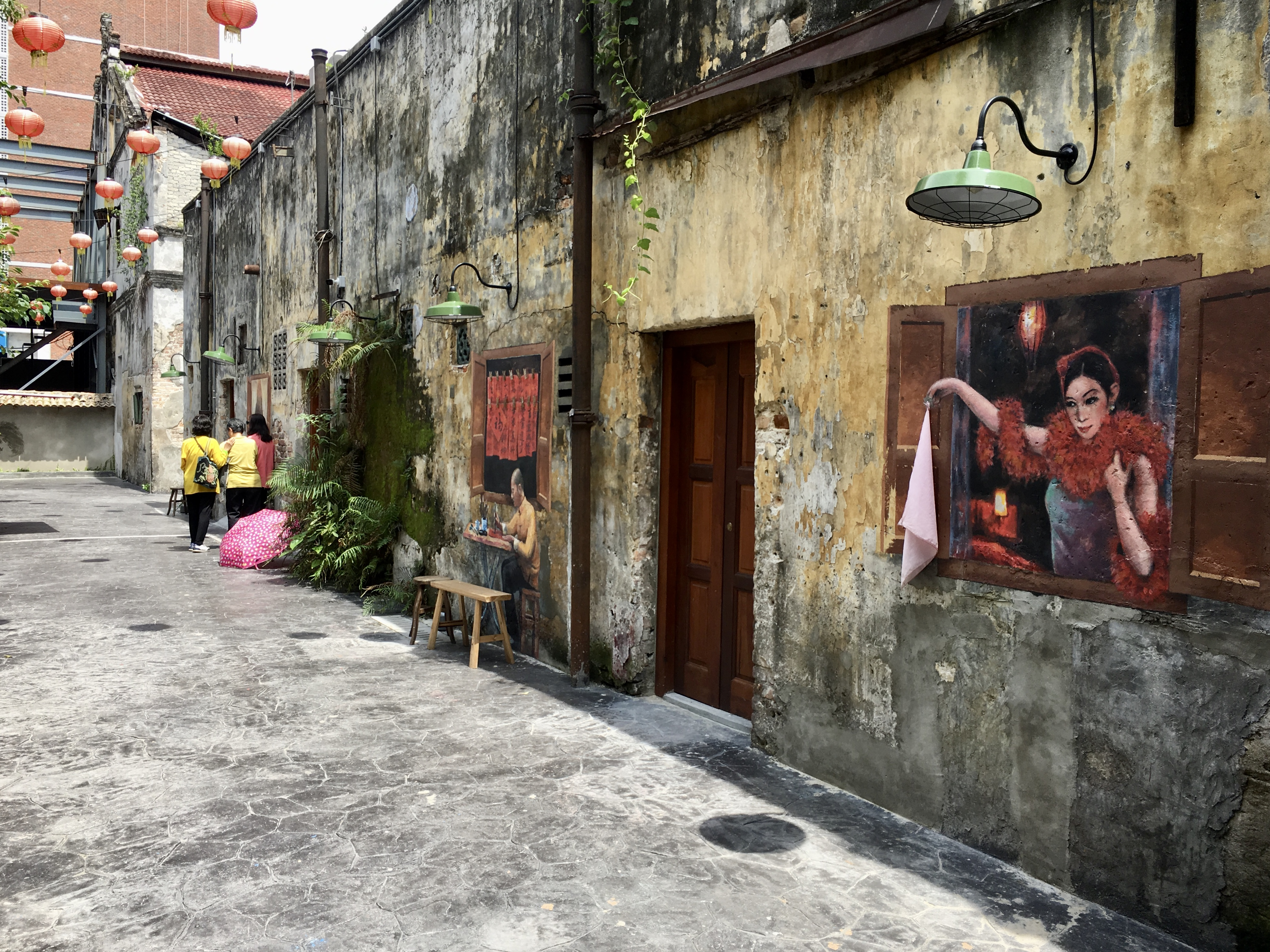
A mural in Kwai Chai Hong depicting a prostitute

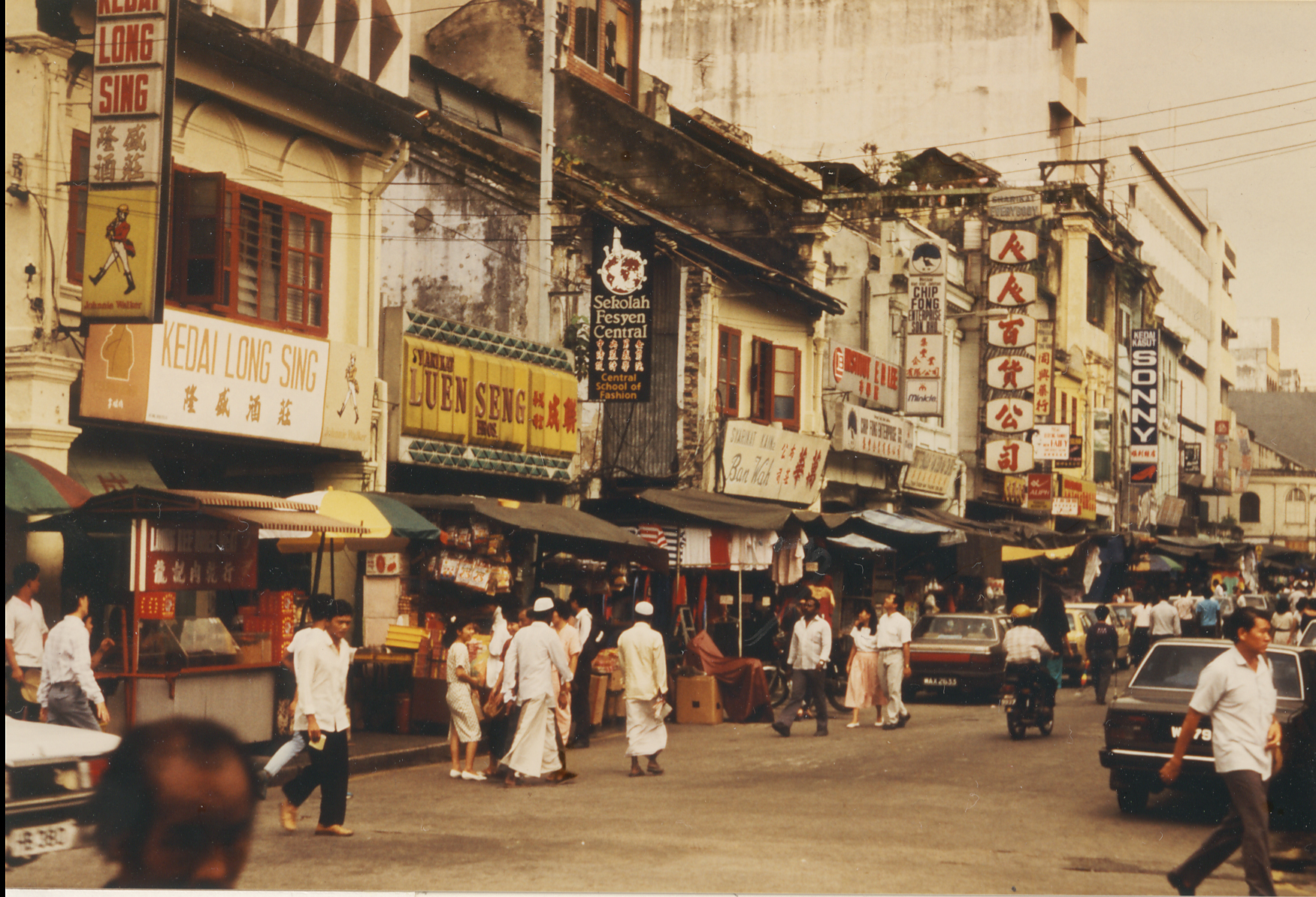
KL Chinatown in 1989
