= Coat of arms of Malaysia =

- Armiger: Malaysia
- Adopted: 1963 (last modified 1988)
- Crest: A crescent and a fourteen-point federal star
- Shield: The upper portion or chief of the shield contains five krises on a red background, representing the five former Unfederated Malay States, Perlis, Kedah, Kelantan, Terengganu and Johor. In the upper middle of the shield, below the row of krises, are the colours red, black, white and yellow of the Federated Malay States (Perak, Selangor, Negeri Sembilan and Pahang) arranged from left to right. Tierced per pale, the second three-and-a-half times as wide as the other two: The first (at dexter) tierced per fess: Argent, on a wreath of the colours upon a mount an areca nut-palm leaved and fructed Proper, or a representation of the Penang Bridge proper and barry wavy of ten Azure and Argent; the second per fess, in chief paly of four Gules, Sable, Argent and or, in base tierced per pale all Argent, the Coat of Arms of Sabah, a Bunga Raya (hibiscus flower), and the Coat of Arms of Sarawak all Proper; the third (at sinister) Argent, a Malacca tree standing on a base Proper; and a chief Gules, five krisses in their sheaths, per pale.
- Supporters: Two malayan tigers rampant proper
- Motto: Bersekutu Bertambah Mutu (Malay) ('Unity makes Strength')

The coat of arms of Malaysia (Jata Negara Malaysia) is a coat of arms comprising a shield or escutcheon, two tigers for supporters, a crescent and fourteen-point star for a crest and a motto. As the Malaysian coat of arms descended from that of the Federated Malay States under British colonial rule, it resembles European heraldic designs.

== Design ==
The coat of arms consists of a shield guarded by two rampant tigers proper as supporters. The shield is topped by a crest consisting of a yellow crescent with a 14-point "federal star", and includes a motto, on a banner, at the bottom.

=== Crest ===
The yellow colour of the crest, a crescent and a 14-point federal star, symbolises the country's monarchy. The star crescent also represents Islam as the official religion while the federal star alone the thirteen states and the federal territories of Malaysia.

Originally, the fourteen-point star represented the original fourteen states of Malaysia, which included Singapore. It was not changed when Singapore left the Federation in 9 August 1965, but it has generally been accepted that the 14th point represents the federal territories.

=== Escutcheon ===
The escutcheon, represented by a shield, is primarily intended to serve as a representation of states unified under the Malaysian federation, and is subdivided into ten divisions.

The upper portion or chief of the shield contains five krises on a red background, representing the five former Unfederated Malay States, Johore, Terengganu, Kelantan, Kedah and Perlis. In a lesser extent, the 5 krises also symbolizes the 5 national principles, known as Rukun Negara. The remainder of the shield, which in the coat of arms of Malaya was divided in three per pale (longitudinally) between the former Federated Malay States, Penang and Malacca, is now divided into four sections:

- In the upper middle of the shield, below the row of krises, are the colours of the Federated Malay States (red, black, white and yellow) arranged from left to right. The permutations of the colours red, black, white and yellow make up the colours of these states' flags. Red and yellow for representing the state of Selangor; black and white for representing the state of Pahang; black, white and yellow for representing the state of Perak and red, black and yellow are for representing the state of Negeri Sembilan.
- In the dexter (left from the observer's point of view) section is the Pinang palm along with the Penang Bridge representing the state of Penang
- In the sinister (right from the observer's point of view) section is the "Malacca" tree representing the state of Malacca.
- In the lower middle of the shield, there are three sections formerly representing the new (in 1963) states of Sabah, Singapore and Sarawak. Since 9 August 1965, Singapore's section has been replaced by a depiction of the national flower, the hibiscus.

=== Supporters ===
The two rampant tigers supporting the shield are traditional Malay symbols. They are retained from the earlier armorial ensign of the Federation of Malaya, and prior to that of the Federated Malay States. They symbolise strength and courage.

=== Motto ===
The motto of the arms, located below the shield, consists of a banner with the phrase "Unity is Strength" (Bersekutu Bertambah Mutu) written in both romanised Malay and Jawi. The original English phrase was replaced by romanised Malay in 1963.

== History ==
=== Federated Malay States and Malayan Union ===
The origins of the Malaysian coat of arms can be traced to the formation of the Federated Malay States (FMS) under the colonial rule of the United Kingdom. In conjunction with the introduction of the flag of the Federated Malay States in 1895, the FMS coat of arms was adopted and remained in use from 1895 to the formation of the Federation of Malaya in 1948.

The arms, like its modern successors, included a shield, two tigers, and a banner, but depicts an eastern crown on the helm, representing the four sultanates. The shield's design was also significantly simpler; as the FMS consists of only four states, the shield encompassed a quarterly "party per cross" division representing the colours of the flag of the four FMS (in the same way the flag of the FMS represents the states, and the colours in the modern Malaysian arms represent the same states). The motto was also originally written in Jawi as "Dipelihara Allah" (Under God's (Allah's) Protection) flanked by two eight-point stars. Dipelihara Allah is today the Selangor state motto.

While the establishment of the Malayan Union in 1946 brought about the merging of the FMS with the five Unfederated Malay States and two of the Straits Settlements (excluding Singapore), the FMS arms remained in use unchanged as the Union's coat of arms for two years before the Union's dissolution.

The arms is blazoned as such:

Crest: An eastern crown Or.

Shield: Quarterly Argent, Gules, Sable and Or.

Supporters: Two tigers rampant proper.

Motto: Dipelihara Allah in Jawi Malay script.

=== Federation of Malaya ===
The Federation of Malaya arms in use between 1952 and 1963, based heavily on the FMS arms, would serve as the basis of the current Malaysian arms.

The founding of the Federation of Malaya in 1948 led to a revision of the arms, which was officially proclaimed and adopted on 12 May 1952. Among the changes were a more complete representation the 11 states of the federation on the shield (where new partitions containing insignias of the additional states added over and beside the original FMS colours), the replacement of the eastern crown with a yellow crescent and an 11-point federal star (symbols representing the 11 states that were derived from the flag of the Federation of Malaya). The original Jawi motto was also replaced with "Unity is Strength" in both English and Jawi Malay.

At the point of adoption, the shield was composed of the following elements:

- In chief, the five krises representing the Unfederated Malay States;
- In pale, the quartered colours of the FMS;
- In dexter, the Prince of Wales's feathers, battlement (or crenellation), and waves from the Penang coat of arms; and
- In sinister, and gate of A Famosa from the Malaccan coat of arms.

The arms is blazoned as such:

Crest: A crescent and an eleven-point federal star Or.

Shield: Tierced per pale, The first (at dexter) per fess embattled Or and barry wavy of eight Azure and Argent in chief a plume of three ostrich feathers surmounted by a riband of the Second on the riband the words Ich Dien in letters of the First; the second (at fess point) quarterly Argent, Gules, Sable and Or; the third (at sinister) Azure, a representation of the gate of A Famosa Proper; and a chief Gules, five krisses in their sheaths, per pale Or.

Supporters: Two tigers rampant proper.

Motto: Unity is Strength in English and Bersekutu Bertambah Mutu in Jawi Malay scripts.

=== Malaysia ===
Coat of arms of Malaysia used 1963–1965, with three new member states added to the bottom: Sabah, Singapore and Sarawak.

Coat of arms of Malaysia used 1965–1973, following the separation of Singapore from the Federation.

Coat of arms of Malaysia used 1973–1982. The Brooke-era flag of Sarawak was replaced with the new coat of arms of Sarawak.

Coat of arms of Malaysia used 1982–1988. The heraldic tigers were redesigned to appear more realistic, Sabah changed its coat of arms to a kingfisher, albeit short-lived, and the Penang Bridge replaced the Prince of Wales's feathers.

Coat of arms of Malaysia used since 1988. The flag of Sabah was replaced with the new coat of arms of Sabah.

The royal arms of the Yang di-Pertuan Agong of Malaysia.

The arms was amended a second time after the formation of Malaysia, with the admission of Singapore (Gules, a crescent facing a pentagon of five mullets Argent) and the Borneo states of North Borneo (renamed Sabah) and Sarawak (Or, on a cross parted per pale Sable and Gules, an Eastern Crown of the first) in 1963. The increased number of states later resulted in the modification of the Federation of Malaya coat of arms to support the three new member states with the widening of the shield. The tigers were redesigned to assume different positions of limbs (front limbs reaching over and behind the shield, and rear limbs reaching over the motto and the shield), and minor adjustments were also made on the appearance of the banner and the length of the crescent, while the eleven-point federal star was updated to include 14 points. In tandem with Malay as Malaysia's national language, the motto's language was changed from English to Malay.

During this period of revision, Malacca's colonial A Famosa insignia was replaced by a Malacca tree. Some of the symbols was modified to eliminate the colonial symbols and other non-Islamic symbols. While other symbols remained. Penang's Prince of Wales's feathers and battlement were gradually replaced, by first substituting the feathers with a Pinang or Areca-nut palm, and later, the battlement with the Penang Bridge (which was constructed and completed during the 1980s) and the barry wavy of eight Azure and Argent to ten. Following the separation of Singapore from the Federation in 1965, the coat of arms was redesigned again. In 1988, Sarawak's symbol replaced by the current rhinoceros hornbill-based state arms; similarly, Sabah, which was originally represented by only its flag held up by a pair of arms from its pre-1963 state coat of arms (blazoned "Argent, Crest of the Coat of Arms of Sabah Proper"), was revised to fully feature its current state arms in entirely. The supporters of Malaysia's coat of arms were modified in 1982 to be more realistic and with a more aggressive appearance.

The present coat of arms is featured on the flag of Putrajaya - signifying Putrajaya's importance as the new seat of the Malaysian government

== Uses ==
The arms is adopted on several state flags. The Royal Standard of the Yang di-Pertuan Agong, the flag of the Federal Territories, flag of Putrajaya and the Malaysian passport all feature the coat of arms charged in the centre largely unmodified.

== See also ==
- Armorial of Malaysia
