= Armorial of Malaysia =

This is a list of Malaysian coats of arms. Each of the thirteen States of Malaysia has their own coat of arms, either adopted during colonial era or the nation's formative years. In Malay, the coat of arms is called a jata.

Heraldry is largely unregulated in Malaysia due to absence of a Central heraldic authority like the College of Arms in the United Kingdom.

== National ==
Arms	Date of adoption	Use	Description/Blazon
Coat of arms of Malaysia	1988	Coat of arms of Malaysia (Jata Negara)	Crest: A crescent and a fourteen-pointed federal star Or. Shield: Tierced per pale, the second three-and-a-half times as wide as the other two: The first (at dexter) tierced per fess: Argent, on a wreath of the colours upon a mount an areca nut-palm leaved and fructed Proper, Or a representation of the Penang Bridge proper and barry wavy of ten Azure and Argent; the second per fess, in chief paly of four Gules, Sable, Argent and Or, in base tierced per pale all Argent, the Coat of Arms of Sabah, a Bunga Raya (hibiscus flower), and the Coat of Arms of Sarawak all proper; the third (at sinister) Argent, a Malacca tree standing on a base proper; and a chief Gules, five krisses in their sheaths, per pale Or. Supporters: Two tigers rampant proper. Motto: Bersekutu Bertambah Mutu (Unity is Strength) in Rumi (Latin) and Jawi scripts.
	1952–1963	Coat of arms of the Federation of Malaya from 1952 to 1963	Crest: A crescent and an eleven-pointed federal star Or. Shield: Tierced per pale, The first (at dexter) per fess embattled Or and barry wavy of eight Azure and Argent in chief a plume of three ostrich feathers surmounted by a riband of the Second on the riband the words Ich Dien in letters of the First; the second (at fess point) quarterly Argent, Gules, Sable and Or; the third (at sinister) Azure, a representation of the gate of A Famosa Proper; and a chief Gules, five krisses in their sheaths, per pale Or. Supporters: Two tigers rampant proper. Motto: Unity is Strength in English and Bersekutu Bertambah Mutu in Jawi Malay scripts.
	1963–1965	Coat of arms of Malaysia from 1963 to 1965	The Federation of Malaysia arms in use between 1963 and 1965, with three new member states added to the bottom: Sabah (Argent, Crest of the Coat of Arms of Sabah Proper), Singapore (Gules, a crescent facing a pentagon of five mullets Argent) and Sarawak (Or, on a cross parted per pale Sable and Gules, an Eastern Crown of the field). Additionally, the A Famosa Gate of the Malacca section was replaced with a Malacca tree.
	1965–1973	Coat of arms of Malaysia from 1965 to 1973	Following the separation of Singapore from the Federation, its section was replaced with a bunga raya.
	1973–1982	Coat of arms of Malaysia from 1973 to 1982	Sarawak changed its coat of arms to a rhinoceros hornbill.
	1982–1988	Coat of arms of Malaysia from 1982 to 1988	Sabah changed its coat of arms to a kingfisher, albeit short-lived, while the Penang Bridge replaced the Prince of Wales's feathers and the battlement. Additionally, the areca nut palm from the coat of arms of Penang was placed on top of the Bridge, and the number of waves under the bridge was increased from eight to ten.

== States ==
Arms	Date of adoption	Use	Description/Blazon
	1870	Coat of arms of Perlis	A green shield containing a yellow rice wreath and "Perlis" written in Jawi script, enveloped by a wreath of two green rice stalks.
	1923–present	Coat of arms of Kedah	A yellow shield containing "Negeri Kedah" (State of Kedah) written in Jawi, with a green crescent below, both enveloped by a wreath of two yellow rice stalks.
	1983–present	Coat of arms of Penang	Shield: Barry wavy of ten Azure and Argent upon a chief Or a depiction of the Penang Bridge Proper Crest: On a wreath of the Colours upon a mount a Pinang or Areca-nut palm leaved and fructed Proper
	1948–present	Coat of arms of Perak	
	1916–present	Coat of arms of Kelantan	A star and crescent backed by pairs of spears, kris daggers and cannons, all of which are topped by a coronet, supported by a pair of muntjacs (kijang) and carries a scroll containing "Berserah Kepada Tuhan Kerajaan Kelantan" (Surrender to God The Kingdom of Kelantan) written in Jawi.
	1932–present	Coat of arms of Terengganu	A dotted seal containing a coronet, a sword, a long kris, two books and a scarf, with "Terengganu" written in Jawi at the bottom and topped by a star and crescent, all enveloped by an oval outline.
	19--	Coat of arms of Pahang	A spear head sided by two halves of text written in Jawi, backed by a pair of tusks and based on a scroll containing "Negeri Pahang" (State of Pahang) written in both Rumi and Jawi scripts.
	19--	Coat of arms of Selangor	
	19--	Coat of arms of Negeri Sembilan	A shield topped by a staff fronted by a red sword and red scabbard; the shield contains three diagonal bands of yellow, black and red, a scroll containing "Negeri Sembilan" written in Jawi that holds nine stalks of rice, and a nine-pointed star below.
	1960–present	Coat of arms of Malacca	A shield containing five krises, two bands of red and yellow, and a Malacca tree, all of which are topped by a star and crescent, supported by two chevrotains (pelanduk), and based on a scroll containing the motto "Bersatu Teguh" (Firmly United) written in both Rumi and Jawi, and "Melaka" in Rumi.
	1892–present	Coat of arms of Johor	A shield containing a star and crescent and four stars, topped by a coronet, supported by two tigers and based on a compartment and scroll containing "Kepada Allah Berserah" (To God We Surrender) written in Jawi.
	1988–present	Coat of arms of Sarawak	A shield features a symbolic wing-spread rhinoceros hornbill (burung kenyalang) with the shield bearing the state flag on its chest. The hornbill's wings have 13 feathers, which represent the states in Malaysia. The Hibiscus represent the Malaysia's national flower which appears on the right and left sides of the bird's legs and the hornbill is perched on a banner bearing the words "Bersatu, Berusaha, Berbakti" (Unity, Effort, Service).
	1988–present	Coat of arms of Sabah	The two arms carrying the Sabah flag represents unity and harmony among its multiracial citizens, while the silhouette of Mount Kinabalu in the shield represents the state of Sabah. The state motto, "Sabah Maju Jaya" (Onward, Sabah) is displayed at the bottom of the emblem. The five colours represent the five residencies of the state, as well as symbolising courage and determination (Red), purity and justice (White), peace and calm (Zircon blue), unity and prosperity (Icicle blue) and strength and harmony (Royal blue). Crest: Upon a wreath of the Colours, two arms embowed, the hands grasping a staff thereon hoisted Sabah State Flag flowing to the sinister proper Shield: Bleu celeste, a representation of Mount Kinabalu proper, and a chief tierced per chevron reversed Azure, Argent and Gules

== Federal Territories ==
Arms	Date of adoption	Use	Description/Blazon
	31 January 1992	Coat of arms of Kuala Lumpur	A modification of the coat of arms of the former municipal council, it incorporates the city's emblem in use since Kuala Lumpur became a city in 1972. The city's emblem consists of three hexagons curled spirally, clockwise from top to bottom: The first one, blue with crescent and federal star represents Kuala Lumpur as the Federal Capital; The second one, yellow with interlaced ringgit or dollar signs ($) represents Kuala Lumpur as the commercial centre; and; The third one, green with an atom symbol and an open book represents Kuala Lumpur as the centre for culture and education.; Other features of the coat of arms include: A pair of inverted crossed krisses in front of the tiger's head (erased) as crest; A shield charged with red, white and blue chevrons; and; Two branches of hibiscus plants with flowers wraped up by ribbons with red, white and blue stripes as supporters.; The city's emblem originally had the name "Kuala Lumpur" at the top and the motto "Maju dan Makmur" (Progress and Prosper) at the bottom. Although the 1992 information book published by the Kuala Lumpur City Hall suggested the use of this emblem by Kuala Lumpur residents, it is rarely seen on public display nowadays.
	1 July 2001	Emblem of Labuan	An orange map of Malaysia with enlarged section of the Labuan Territory.
	1 March 1996	Emblem of Putrajaya	An abstract image consists of various shapes and polygons, symbolising Putrajaya as a Garden City.

== Historical ==
Arms	Date of adoption	Use	Description
	1874—1946	Coat of arms of the Straits Settlements	Shield: "Quarterly, the first quarter gules, issuant from the base a tower proper, on the battlements thereof a lion passant guardant Or; the second quarter argent, on a mount an areca nut palm tree proper; the third quarter also argent a sprig of the oil tree keruing proper; the fourth quarter azure in base on waves of the sea in front of a representation of the sun rising behind a mountain, a sailing yacht in full sail to the sinister, all proper." Crest: "A demi-lion rampant guardant supporting in the paws a staff proper, thereon flying to the sinister a banner azure, charged with three imperial crowns."
	1896—1950	Coat of arms of the Federated Malay States (1896—1946), the Malayan Union (1946—1948) and the Federation of Malaya (1948—1950)	Quarterly "party per cross" shield containing four segments coloured white (argent), red (gules), black (sable) and yellow (Or), topped by a coronet (an Eastern Crown Or), supported by two tigers (rampant) and based on a scroll containing the motto "Dipelihara Allah" written in Jawi.
	1949–1950	Coat of arms of the Crown Colony of Penang from 1949 to 1950.	Shield: Barry wavy of eight Azure and Argent upon a chief embattled Or a plume of three ostrich feathers surmounted by a riband of the First on the riband the words Ich Dien in letters of the Third. Crest: On a wreath of the Colours upon a mount a Pinang or Areca-nut palm leaved and fructed Proper.
	1950—1988	Coat of arms of the Crown Colony of Penang from 1950 to 1957, also used for the state of Penang from 1957 to 1988.	The motto Bersatu dan Setia (Malay: "United and Loyal") was added beneath the shield in 1950.
	1912-1946	Coat of arms of the Crown Colony of Labuan	The badge was used from 1912 until 1946.
	1841—1946	Coat of arms of the Kingdom of Sarawak from 1841 to 1946	The heraldic arms of the Brooke dynasty of the Raj of Sarawak based on the emblem used by James Brooke.
	1946—1973	Coat of arms of the Crown Colony of Sarawak from 1946 to 1963, also used for the state of Sarawak from 1963 to 1973	The coat of arms is used from 1946 to 1963 by the British crown colony government in Sarawak. Continued to be used for the state of Sarawak from 1963 to 1973 after joining Malaya, Singapore, and Sabah (North Borneo) to form Malaysia.
	1973—1988	Coat of arms of the state of Sarawak from 1973 to 1988	This coat of arms was used from 1973 to 1988 by the state of Sarawak. Its design serves as the basis for the state's current coat of arms and was the first to feature Rhinoceros Hornbill as the state emblem. Most of the elements of the emblem are similar to the current version, except for the "Trisakti" flag, then state flag of Sarawak on the shield and the motto Hidup Selalu Berkhidmat ("Live to serve").
	1882–1902	Badge of British North Borneo	The badge was used from 1882 to 1902.
	1902–1946	Badge of British North Borneo	The badge was used from 1902 to 1946.
	1948–1963	Badge of British North Borneo	The badge was used from 1948 to 1963.
	1948—1963	Coat of arms of the Crown Colony of North Borneo from 1948 to 1963	The coat of arms is used from 1948 to 1963 by the British crown colony government in North Borneo.
	1963—1982	Coat of arms of the state of Sabah from 1963 to 1982.	The coat of arms was used from 1963 to 1982 by the state of Sabah.
	1982—1988	Coat of arms of the state of Sabah from 1982 to 1988.	During this period, the Sabah state government choose to adopt a state coat of arms that resembled Sarawak's hornbill, as a memory of the two Borneo states' common history as vassal states of Brunei in the pre-British times. Sabah adopted a kingfisher because its indigenous Bajau sea gypsies, who are politically powerful in the state administration, and another powerful indigenous group, the Bruneians from Brunei, identify with the bird to a great extent. Both Bajaus and Bruneians were traditionally fishermen, and amongst Borneo natives, birds are considered messengers of the gods. The omen bird for the fishermen is the kingfisher. The majority native tribe, the interior-dwelling Kadazans or Dusuns, identify with the kingfisher to a lesser extent, as the bird is commonly found amongst their main occupational group, the rice farmers.

== See also ==
- List of Malaysian flags
