= Coat of arms of Malacca =

Symbol of the Malaysian state

- Armiger: Malacca
- Adopted: 1959
- Crest: A crescent and a mullet Or
- Shield: Argent, a Malacca tree standing on a base proper; on the dexter a side Or and on the sinister a side Gules, upon a chief Azure, five krisses in their sheaths per pale Or.
- Supporters: Two mousedeers rampant proper
- Motto: Bersatu Teguh ("unity is strength", "firmly united" or "united we stand") on left side with romanised Malay and right side with Jawi script (برساتو تڬوه), Melaka with romanised Malay on centre

The Coat of arms of Malacca resembles European heraldic designs, and descended from that of Malaysia and the Federated Malay States under British colonial rule.

The four colours on the arms: red, white, yellow and blue indicate that Malacca is part of Malaysia. The star and crescent, which stand on the crest represents Islam, the official religion of the state. The five krises represent the five legendary warriors of the ancient Malacca Sultanate, who are Hang Tuah, Hang Jebat, Hang Kasturi, Hang Lekir, and Hang Lekiu.

The two mouse-deer supporting the shield serve to recall the incident involving the mouse-deer: legend has it that a mouse-deer had attacked one of the hunting dogs brought by the entourage of Parameswara, the first ruler of the state, and kicked the dog into the river. Parameswara, who had fleeing the kingdom of Singapura at this point, considered the incident to be a good omen and decided to found a kingdom under it. He decides to name the settlement as Malacca, after the Malacca tree which he leaned against while witnessing the event, hence the tree is depicted in the shield.

A scroll at the bottom denotes the state motto: '"Bersatu Teguh" ("unity is strength", "firmly united" or "united we stand") on left side with romanised Malay and right side with Jawi script, and the state name written in Romanised Malay – "Melaka" on centre.

The state coat of arms can be blazoned as:

Shield: Argent, a Malacca tree standing on a base proper; on the dexter a side Or and on the sinister a side Gules, upon a chief Azure, five krisses in their sheaths per pale Or.

Crest: A crescent and a mullet Or.

Supporters: Two mousedeers rampant proper.

Motto: Bersatu Teguh ("unity is strength", "firmly united" or "united we stand") on left side with romanised Malay and right side with Jawi script (برساتو تڬوه),
Melaka with romanised Malay on centre.

Another version of the arms with two yellow rice stalks is reserved for use by the Yang di-Pertua Negeri of Malacca.

== Historical settlement and state arms ==
Coat of arms	Duration	Political entity	Description	Notes
	1874–1942, 1945–1946	Straits Settlements	Shield: "Quarterly, the Dexter Chief gules, issuant from the base a tower proper, on the battlements thereof a lion passant guardant Or; the second quarter argent, on a mount an areca nut palm tree proper; the third quarter also argent a sprig of the oil tree keruing proper; the fourth quarter azure in base on waves of the sea in front of a representation of the sun rising behind a mountain, a sailing yacht in full sail to the sinister, all proper." Crest: "A demi-lion rampant guardant supporting in the paws a staff proper, thereon flying to the sinister a banner azure, charged with three imperial crowns."	The "third quarter argent" containing a sprig of the oil tree keruing represented Malacca.
	1951–1959	Crown Colony of Malacca and State of Malacca	Shield: "Argent, on a water barry wavy a two masted Chinese Junk with sails furled proper; a bordure Azure, billette Or; on a canton of the first with a branch of Malacca Tree, all proper." Crest: "On a wreath of Argent and Azure upon a mount the A Famosa proper" Motto: "Ex Unitate Vires" (Unity is Strength, in Latin)	The current state motto – Bersatu Teguh is a rough translation of the motto of this arm, which was granted to the Settlement of Malacca, then in the Federation of Malaya, by a Royal warrant of King George VI dated 14 August 1951. It represents the unity of all the races in the settlement. The Malacca Tree is said to represent the Malays and the British, the Junk represents the Chinese and the Border represents the Dutch.

== City and municipal council emblems ==
All 4 local governments in Malacca have their own emblem, which evolved in design throughout history. Each design may reflect a municipality's identities and or the roles and responsibilities of its local authority.

Emblem of Malacca City Council

Municipality	Local government	Notable element(s)	Motto(s)
Alor Gajah	Alor Gajah Municipal Council	Stylised initials of Alor Gajah: A in blue and G in red	Majlis Perbandaran Alor Gajah (Alor Gajah Municipal Council)
Hang Tuah Jaya	Hang Tuah Jaya Municipal Council	Kris; Lobster claws (official flower); Stylised initials of the local authority MPHTJ in state colours	Bandaraya Pintar (Smart City); Majlis Perbandaran Hang Tuah Jaya (Hang Tuah Jaya Municipal Council)
Jasin	Jasin Municipal Council	Allamanda (official flower); Stylised initials of the local authority MPJ	Majlis Perbandaran Jasin (Jasin Municipal Council)
Malacca City	Malacca City Council	A Famosa; Floral compartment; Kris; Mousedeer; Sultanate Palace	Majlis Bandaraya Melaka Bersejarah (Malacca Historic City Council)

=== Town and Fort Municipality Arms ===
The coat of arms of the former Municipal Council of the Town and Fort of Malacca, adopted in the late 1930s, had a two masted Chinese Junk with sails furled proper on water barry wavy and a bordure embattled and billety in its base and two Malacca trees and an anchor in the chief. In the crest there is a helm mantled and on top of it there is a mousedeer saltant in front of the Malacca Tree standing on a base on a wreath of colours. The motto of the arms was "Salus Populi Suprema Lex" which means the welfare of the people should be the supreme law in Latin.

== See also ==
- Flag of Malacca
- Armorial of Malaysia
