= Crown colony =

Type of British colony directly administered by the British central government

Coat of arms of King James I. In 1624, the Crown revoked the royal charter earlier granted to the Virginia Company, and assumed direct government of the colony.

A Crown colony or royal colony was a colony governed by England, or later by Great Britain or the United Kingdom, as part of the English and later British Empire. Such colonies usually had a governor representing the Crown and thus holding executive power of the territory; this person was appointed by the UK Government (through the monarch), and governed the relevant territory with or without the assistance of a locally appointed or elected council. In some cases, especially in larger colonies, this council was split into two: an executive council and a legislative council, and the executive council was similar to the Privy Council that advises the monarch. Members of executive councils were appointed by the governors, and British citizens resident in Crown colonies either had no representation in local government, or limited representation in a lower house. In several Crown colonies, this limited representation grew over time. As the House of Commons of the British Parliament has never included seats for any of the colonies, there was no direct representation in the sovereign government for British subjects or citizens residing in Crown colonies.

The administration of Crown colonies changed over time and in the 1800s some became, with a loosening of the power of royal governors, self-governing colonies, within which the sovereign state (the UK Government) delegated legislation for most local internal matters of governance to elected assemblies, with consent of the governor, overseen by the Colonial Office and the Board of Trade and Plantations. The Colonial Office gave way to the Dominion Office for some of these territories in 1925. Elected lower houses had their beginnings in the House of Burgesses of the Colony of Virginia in 1619 and the House of Assembly of the Parliament of Bermuda in 1620. While initially limited in government even with an elected lower house, over the centuries in some Crown colonies, more independent authority was given.

Like most colonial establishments, the main focus was the extraction of local resources and raw materials. All remaining British colonies, whether Crown (such as the Falkland Islands) or self-governing (such as Bermuda), were renamed "British Dependent Territories" from 1 January 1983 under the British Nationality Act 1981. Many British citizens in the colonies (with the exceptions of the Falkland Islanders and subsequently the Gibraltarians) found that their "Citizenship of the United Kingdom and Colonies" had changed overnight to British Dependent Territories Citizenship, a form of British citizenship that stripped them of some of their rights, including the right to reside and work in the United Kingdom. From 2002, the dependent territories have been known officially as British Overseas Territories.

== History ==
Early English colonies were often proprietary colonies, usually established and administered by companies under charters granted by the monarch. The first "royal colony" was the Colony of Virginia, after 1624, when the Crown of the Kingdom of England revoked the royal charter it had granted to the Virginia Company and assumed control of government of the territory.

Executive crown governors are sometimes complemented by a locally appointed and/or elected legislature with limited powers – that is, such territories lack a fully sovereign government locally, as some powers (eg over foreign relations, or constitutional amendment, or defense) remain in the hands of the parliament or executive government in London. For example, while the House of Assembly of Bermuda has existed continuously since its first session in 1620, Bermuda has only had a fully sovereign locally elected responsible government since 1968. (Bermuda became a Crown colony in 1684, when the government revoked a royal charter given to the Somers Isles Company, successor to the Virginia Company, which had previously controlled administration, including the appointment of governors; thenceforth (until 1968) the government in London appointed the Governor of Bermuda.)

Despite its later usage, the term "Crown colony" was used primarily, until the mid-19th century, to refer to colonies that had been acquired through wars, such as Trinidad and Tobago. From the mid-19th century, the term was more broadly applied to every British territory other than British India, including many self-governing colonies, amongst them the Province of Canada, Newfoundland, British Columbia, New South Wales, Queensland, South Australia, Tasmania, Victoria, Western Australia, and New Zealand.

By the mid-19th century, the monarch was appointing colonial governors only on the advice of the Secretary of State for the Colonies, who in turn -- depending on the level of local government and representation present in the colony -- would also take soundings or receive suggestions as to the best person to appoint from those in the colony's extant in situ government.

=== Reclassification (1981) ===
The term Crown colony continued to be used until 1981, when the British Nationality Act 1981 reclassified the remaining British colonies as "British Dependent Territories". By this time, the term "Crown colony" referred specifically to colonies lacking substantial autonomy, which were administered by an executive governor, appointed by the British Government – such as Hong Kong, before its transfer in 1997 to the People's Republic of China. In 2002, the British Overseas Territories Act 2002 further changed their name to British Overseas Territories.

== Types ==
There were three types of Crown colony as of 1918, with differing degrees of autonomy:

Crown colonies with representative organs locally, such as Bermuda, Jamaica, Ceylon (later Sri Lanka) and Fiji; typically such governments consisted of two legislative chambers (they were 'bi-cameral) -- an upper house with Crown-appointed councillors (MLCs) and a lower house with locally elected members (MPs).

Crown colonies with nominated governing and legislative bodies, such as British Honduras, Sierra Leone, British Windward Islands and Hong Kong, were staffed entirely by Crown-appointed members, with some appointed representation from the local population. Hong Kong had a representative council following the introduction of election for the Hong Kong Legislative Council in 1995.

Crown colonies ruled directly by a governor, such as Basutoland, Gibraltar, Saint Helena and Singapore, were fewest in number, were often smaller in territory or population, and had the least autonomy.

== List ==
The "from" column lists the year the colony began to be administered by the Crown. These colonies may have existed under a different type of English colonial administration before then.

Crown colonies
Name of colony	from	to	Reason for change of status
Aden	1937	1967	Became part of the Federation of South Arabia.
Akrotiri and Dhekelia	1960	1982	Became British Dependent Territory in 1983.
Anguilla	1980	1983	Became British Dependent Territory in 1983.
(Antigua and Barbuda) Antigua	1663	1967	Became an associated state.
(United Kingdom) Ashanti	1902	1957	Became part of the dominion named Ghana upon its establishment in 1957.
(The Bahamas) Bahamas	1718	1973	Became an independent Commonwealth realm.
Barbados	1663	1966	Became an independent Commonwealth realm.
(Lesotho) Basutoland	1884	1966	Became independent as Lesotho in 1966.
(British Honduras) Bay Islands	1852	1861	Became part of the Republic of Honduras in 1861
Bermuda	1684	1982	Became British Dependent Territory in 1983.
British Antarctic Territory	1962	1982	Became British Dependent Territory in 1983.
(United Kingdom) British Bechuanaland	1885	1895	Became part of British Cape Colony in 1895.
British Columbia	1866	1871	Became part of Canada in 1871.
British Guiana	1831	1966	Became independent as Guyana in 1966.
British Honduras (renamed Belize in 1973)	1884	1981	Became independent (as Belize) in 1981.
British Indian Ocean Territory	1965	1983	Became British Dependent Territory in 1983.
(United Kingdom) British New Guinea	1888	1902	Transferred to Australia as the Territory of Papua.
(British rule in Burma) Burma	1937	1948	Separated from British India in 1937 and became a Crown colony. Became independent in 1948 as Burma (later Myanmar).
(United Kingdom) United Province of Canada	1841	1867	Became part of Canada in 1867.
(Kingdom of Great Britain) Cape Breton	1785	1820	Annexed to Nova Scotia in 1820.
Cape Colony	1806	1910	Became part of the Union of South Africa in 1910.
Cayman Islands	1962	1982	Became British Dependent Territory in 1983.
(Dominion of Ceylon) Ceylon	1815	1948	Became independent in 1948 as Dominion of Ceylon (later Sri Lanka).
(United Kingdom) Christmas Island	1888	1958	Became a territory of Australia.
Cyprus	1914	1960	Became independent as Cyprus in 1960.
Dominica	1763	1967	Became an associated state.
(Kingdom of Great Britain) East Florida	1763	1783	Ceded to Spain. Later became part of the United States.
Falkland Islands	1841	1982	Became a British Dependent Territory in 1983.
Fiji	1874	1970	Became independent as Fiji in 1970
Gambia Colony	1888	1965	Became independent as The Gambia in 1965.
(Kingdom of Great Britain) Georgia	1755	1776	Became part of the United States of America in 1776.
Gibraltar	1713	1982	Became a British Dependent Territory in 1983.
Gilbert and Ellice Islands	1916	1976	A colony (and also then UN protectorate) divided into two distinct colonies (Kiribati and Tuvalu) in 1976 in preparation for independence.
Kiribati	1976	1979	Became independent in 1979.
(Gold Coast (British colony)) Gold Coast	1821	1957	Became independent in 1957 with Ashanti and Northern Territories of the Gold Coast as Ghana.
Grenada	1763	1967	Became an associated state.
(United Kingdom) Heligoland	1814	1890	Ceded to the German Empire.
Hong Kong	1843	1982	Imperial Japan military occupied 1941–1945. Reclassified as a British Dependent Territory in 1983. Transferred to Chinese sovereignty in 1997 pursuant to terms of 99-year lease then expiring.
Jamaica	1655	1962	Became independent in 1962 as Jamaica.
Kenya	1920	1963	United with the Kenya Protectorate in 1963 to form the independent country of Kenya.
Labuan	1846	1890	Administered by British North Borneo Company from 1890 to 1904.
Lagos	1862	1906	Became part of Colony and Protectorate of Southern Nigeria in 1906.
(United Kingdom) Lower Canada	1791	1841	Became part of Province of Canada in 1841.
Malacca	1946	1957	Became part of Malaya in 1957.
Malta	1813	1964	Became independent in 1964 as the State of Malta.
(Kingdom of Great Britain) Maryland	1689	1715	Reverted to proprietary rule in 1715, and became part of the United States of America in 1776.
Massachusetts Bay	1691	1776	Became part of the United States of America in 1776.
Mauritius	1810	1968	Became independent as Mauritius in 1968.
Montserrat	1636	1982	Became British Dependent Territory in 1983.
Natal	1843	1910	Became part of the Union of South Africa in 1910.
Newfoundland	1825	1907	Became the Dominion of Newfoundland in 1907, and later joined Canada in 1949.
New Hampshire	1692	1776	Became part of the United States of America in 1776.
(Kingdom of Great Britain) New Ireland	1779	1783	Ceded to the United States of America after Revolutionary War and again after War of 1812 (1814-1815).
(Kingdom of Great Britain) New Jersey	1702	1776	Became part of the United States of America in 1776.
New South Wales	1788	1901	Became part of the Commonwealth of Australia in 1901.
(Kingdom of Great Britain) New York	1685	1776	Became part of the United States of America in 1776.
New Zealand	1841	1907	Became the Dominion of New Zealand in 1907.
Nigeria	1914	1960	Became independent as Nigeria in 1960.
(United Kingdom) Norfolk Island	1788	1914	Placed under administration of Australia in 1914 as a non-self governing territory. The island was self-governing between 1979 and 2015.
North Borneo	1946	1963	Became part of Malaysia in 1963 as Sabah. Labuan separated from Sabah in 1984 to become a Federal Territory.
(Kingdom of Great Britain) North Carolina	1729	1776	Became part of the United States of America in 1776.
(United Kingdom) Nova Scotia	1710	1867	Became part of Canada in 1867.
Orange River Colony	1900	1910	Became part of the Union of South Africa in 1910.
Pitcairn Islands	1887	1982	Became British Dependent Territory in 1983.
Penang	1946	1957	Became part of Malaya in 1957.
(Kingdom of Great Britain) Quebec	1763	1791	Divided between Upper and Lower Canada and the Northwest Territory.
Queensland	1859	1901	Became part of the Commonwealth of Australia in 1901.
(Saint Christopher-Nevis-Anguilla) Saint Christopher, Nevis and Anguilla	1882	1967	Became an associated state.
Saint Helena	1659	1982	Became British Dependent Territory in 1983.
Saint Lucia	1814	1967	Became an associated state.
(Saint Vincent and the Grenadines) Saint Vincent	1776	1969	Became an associated state.
(Crown Colony of Sarawak) Sarawak	1946	1963	Became part of Malaysia in 1963.
Seychelles	1903	1976	Separated from British Mauritius in 1903 and became a Crown Colony and became independent in 1976.
Sierra Leone	1808	1961	Became independent as Sierra Leone in 1961.
Singapore	1946	1963	Became an autonomous state within Malaysia in 1963 and fully independent in 1965.
South Australia	1834	1901	Became part of the Commonwealth of Australia in 1901.
(Kingdom of Great Britain) South Carolina	1729	1776	Became part of the United States of America in 1776.
Southern Nigeria	1906	1914	Part of the Colony and Protectorate of Southern Nigeria. Merged with Northern Nigeria Protectorate as the Colony and Protectorate of Nigeria in 1914.
Southern Rhodesia	1923	1965/1980	Unilateral Declaration of Independence in 1965 as Rhodesia; formally reverted to colonial status in 1979 as Southern Rhodesia; independence granted in 1980 as Zimbabwe
Straits Settlements	1867	1946	Imperial Japan military occupied 1941–1945. Separated into the Crown colonies of Penang, Malacca and Singapore.
Tasmania	1825	1901	Named Van Diemen's Land until 1856, when it became the colony of Tasmania. Became part of the Commonwealth of Australia, as one of six founding colonies that became states, in 1901.
Transvaal Colony	1877	1910	Became part of the Union of South Africa in 1910.
(United Kingdom) Tobago	1877	1889	Became part of Trinidad and Tobago
(United Kingdom) Trinidad	1802	1889	Became part of Trinidad and Tobago
Trinidad and Tobago	1889	1962	Became independent in 1962
Turks and Caicos Islands	1962	1982	Became British Dependent Territory in 1983.
Tuvalu	1976	1978	Became independent in 1978. Formerly part of the Gilbert and Ellice Islands Colony/Protectorate.
(United Kingdom) Upper Canada	1791	1841	Became part of Province of Canada in 1841.
Vancouver Island	1848	1866	Merged with the Colony of British Columbia in 1866, which later joined with other colonies to become the nation of Canada in 1871.
(Victoria (state)) Victoria	1851	1901	Became part of the Commonwealth of Australia in 1901.
(British Virgin Islands) Virgin Islands	1713	1982	Became British Dependent Territory in 1983.
(Kingdom of Great Britain) Virginia	1624	1776	Became part of the United States of America in 1776.
Western Australia	1829	1901	Swan River Colony from 1829 to 1832. Became part of the Commonwealth of Australia in 1901.
(Kingdom of Great Britain) West Florida	1763	1783	Ceded to Spain. Later became part of the United States.

== See also ==
- British protectorate
- Crown dependency
- Direct rule over Northern Ireland
