= Coat of arms of Sabah =

Symbol of the Malaysian state

- Armiger: Sabah
- Adopted: 1988
- Crest: Upon a wreath of the Colours, two arms embowed, the hands grasping a staff thereon hoisted Sabah State Flag flowing to the sinister proper
- Torse: Azure, Gules, Argent, Bleu Celeste
- Shield: Bleu celeste, a representation of Mount Kinabalu proper, and a chief tierced per chevron reversed Azure, Argent and Gules
- Motto: "Sabah Maju Jaya" (Let Sabah Prosper)

The present coat of arms of Sabah is largely based on the coat of arms of the British Crown Colony of North Borneo and the state coat of arms first granted on 31 August 1963.

== Current coat of arms of Sabah ==
The current coat of arms of Sabah were officially established on 16 September 1988, the 25th anniversary of the formation of the Malaysian Federation. The two arms carrying the Sabah State Flag represents unity and harmony among its multiracial citizens towards progress and success. The state motto "Sabah Maju Jaya" means "Sabah Prospers".

The silhouette of Mount Kinabalu represents Sabah State.

The five different colours represent the five residencies (now divisions) of the Sabah State.

- Zircon blue colour represents peace and calmness.
- Icicle blue colour represents unity and prosperity.
- Royal blue colour represents strength and harmony.
- White colour represents purity and justice.
- Chilli red colour represents courage and determination.

Another version of the arms with two yellow rice stalks is reserved for use by the Yang di-Pertua Negeri of Sabah.

== Past coats of arms ==
Coat of arms of the Crown Colony of North Borneo
Description The design of the arms of the British Crown Colony of North Borneo was modified from the arms of the North Borneo Chartered Company (NBCC), which ruled North Borneo from 1882 until 1946 and serves as the basis for both the first and current Sabah state coat of arms. The shield featured the image of a ship saling in front of a mountain, similar to the former badge of the Crown Colony of Labuan which was incorporated into North Borneo on 15 July 1946. The Letter "T" on the mainsail of the schooner commemorates the liberation of Labuan and North Borneo from Japanese occupation by the 9th Australian Division. The "T" represents the shoulder badge of that Division and stands for "Tobruk" where the 9th Division won a historic victory over the Germans in World War II. Years in use 1948–1963 Crest Upon a wreath of the Colours, two arms embowed that on the dexter side being an arm of a native of North Borneo Proper, that on the sinister side being an arm vested Azure cuffed Argent, the hands grasping a staff proper thereon hoisted a flag flowing to the sinister Or charged with a lion passant guardant Gules. Torse Azure and Or Escutcheon Azure in base on waves of the sea in front of a representation of Mount Kinabalu, a sailing yacht in full sail to the sinister on the mizzen the letter “T” Sable all proper, and a chief Or thereon a lion passant guardant Gules. Motto Pergo Et Perago (Latin for I persevere and I achieve)

Coat of arms of the State of Sabah
Description Similar to the arms of the Crown Colony of North Borneo, but with the first state flag of Sabah replaced the colonial flag, a local arm replaced that of a European and the state motto Sabah Maju Jaya replaced the colonial motto. This version of the coat of arms was adopted on 31 August 1963 when Sabah achieve Self-Government within the British Empire and used until 31 December 1981, the day before Peninsular Malaysia aligned its time with that of Sabah and Sarawak to create a unified Malaysia Standard Time. The Sabah State Government led by People's United Front reportedly changed the Coat of arms because the Mount Kinabalu was also the symbol of the United Sabah National Organisation. Years in use 1963–1981 Crest Upon a wreath of the Colours, two arms embowed, the hands grasping a staff thereon hoisted Sabah State Flag flowing to the sinister proper. Torse Azure and Or Escutcheon Azure in base on waves of the sea in front of a representation of Mount Kinabalu, a sailing yacht in full sail to the sinister on the mizzen the letter “T” Sable all proper, and a chief tierced per chevron reversed of five Gules, Argent, Vert, Or and Azure. Motto Sabah Maju Jaya (Let Sabah Prosper)

Coat of arms of the State of Sabah
Description From 1 January 1982 until 15 September 1988, the coat of arms of Sabah was a kingfisher. The Sabah state government chose to adopt a state coat of arms that resembled the hornbill motif of Sarawak's coat of arms, in memory of the two Borneo states' common history as vassal states of Brunei in the pre-British times. The kingfisher was adopted because of its indigenous Bajau sea gypsies (who ancestrally hail from the Southern Philippines since their original homelands of Sulu-Mindanao are strategically close to this Malaysian state), were once politically powerful in the state administration from independence in 1963 until the rise of the United Sabah Party government in 1986, along with ethnic Bruneian Malays who are originally from Brunei in which they constitute the two largest Muslim Bumiputera ethnicities of this Malaysian state in Borneo, identify with this bird to a great extent. Both of these indigenous groups were traditionally fishermen and amongst Borneo natives, birds are considered messengers of the gods. The omen bird for the fishermen is the kingfisher. The majority native tribe, the interior-dwelling Kadazans or Dusuns, identify with the kingfisher to a lesser extent, as the bird is commonly found amongst their main occupational group, the rice farmers. The exclusion of Mount Kinabalu from the coat of arms at that time did not enjoy support from majority of the Sabah populace. Years in use 1982–1988 Escutcheon Tierced per pall, gules, argent and azure. Supporters A Kingfisher proper displayed, clutching a scroll of state motto. Motto Sabah Maju Jaya (Let Sabah Prosper) Other elements Two mirroring paddy plants (15 grains each)

== City and municipal council coat of arms and emblems ==
Emblem of Kota Kinabalu City Hall

Coat of arms of Sandakan Municipal Council

Emblem of Tawau Municipal Council

== See also ==
- Flag of Sabah
- Armorial of Malaysia
