= Flag of Labuan =

The Flag of Labuan may refer to:

- Flag of Labuan Territory (Adopted 2006)
- Flag of the Crown Colony of Labuan (1848–1946)
