= Flag of the Federal Territories =

- Use: Civil and state flag
- Proportion: 1:2
- Adopted: May 23, 2006; 20 years ago
- Design: Three horizontal bars of yellow, blue, and red, with the coat of arms of Malaysia in the middle.
- Designed by: Universiti Teknologi MARA

The flag of the Federal Territories of Malaysia consists of three horizontal bars of yellow, blue, and red, with the coat of arms of Malaysia in the middle. It was officially adopted on 23 May 2006.

== History ==
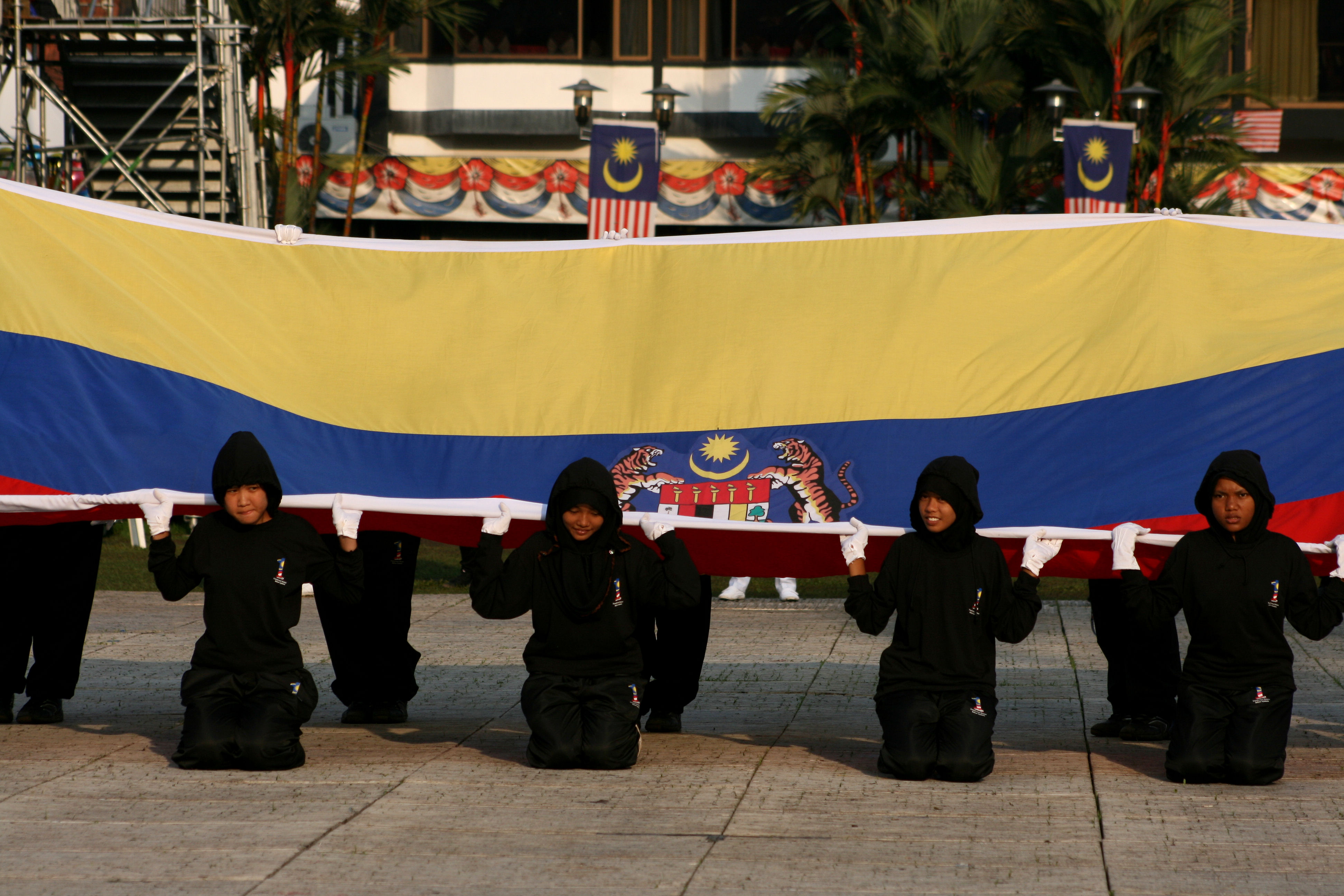
Flag of the Federal Territories at the 2011 Merdeka celebrations

Prior to the adoption of the flag, the three directly governed territories of Kuala Lumpur, Putrajaya and Labuan had utilised the flag of Kuala Lumpur to represent the Federal Territories as a collective unit, which was deemed inappropriate by Minister of Federal Territories, Zulhasnan Rafique as it did not reflect that there were three different Federal Territories. The Cabinet of Malaysia decided to adopt an official flag representing them collectively. The government had already sought the consent of the Yang di-Pertuan Agong Sirajuddin of Perlis on 12 May 2005 a year prior to the act.

On 1 March 2006, a meeting chaired by Zulhasnan Rafique was held. Rafique chose a proposed flag that designed by team from the Universiti Teknologi MARA, his choice was then approved by the cabinet on 26 April 2006.

The flag of the Federal Territories was first unveiled by the minister on 23 May 2006 and launched by the Yang di-Pertuan Agong on 20 August 2006. A series of performances by celebrities and schools were planned to be held at Merdeka Square, Kuala Lumpur to commemorate the launch. Deputy Prime Minister Najib Razak justified the new flag in a speech proclaiming the "common direction" of the three Federal Territories. The flag of the Federal Territories was to be used only when representing them collectively; otherwise, their individual flags remained in force.

The government has since encouraged residents of the three Federal Territories to fly the flag on 1 February to commemorate Federal Territory Day.

== Symbolism ==
The flag has three colours: yellow to represent respect, sovereignty and honour, red for strength and blue for unity, sincerity and harmony. The three stars below the coat of arms of Malaysia stand for the three territories, supporting their mission to become important administrative and business centres.

== Flags of the Federal Territories ==
Flag	Adoption Date	Use	Description
	14 May 1990	Flag of Kuala Lumpur	Three equal bands of white, blue and white with three equal horizontal stripes of red on both white bands. There is a yellow crescent and yellow fourteen-pointed stars on the left within the blue band. Before 2006, this flag was used to represent the entire Federal Territories.
	31 August 1992	Flag of Labuan	Three equal horizontal bands of red (top), white, and blue, there is a yellow crescent and yellow fourteen-pointed stars in the white band.
	1 February 2001	Flag of Putrajaya	Three vertical bands of blue, yellow (double width), and blue with the Malaysian coat of arms in the yellow band.

== See also ==
- Flag of Colombia
- Flag of Ecuador
- Flag of Gran Colombia
- Flag of Venezuela
