= Crown Colony of Malacca =

British colony in Asia from 1946 to 1957

Crown Colony of Malacca Jajahan Mahkota Melaka (Malay)
- 1946–1957
- Flag Badge
- Anthem: God Save the King/Queen
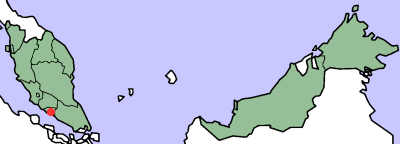
- Location of Malacca
- Status: British Crown Colony State of the Federation of Malaya
- Capital: Malacca Town
- Common languages: English, Malay, Chinese, Tamil and other languages
- Monarchs
  - 1946–1952: George VI
  - 1952–1957: Elizabeth II
- Residents-Councillor
  - 1956–1957: Maurice John Hayward (acting)
- Historical era: Post-war · Cold War
  - Dissolution of the Straits Settlements: 1 April 1946
  - Independence as part of the Federation of Malaya: 31 August 1957
- Currency: Malayan dollar
Preceded by	Succeeded by
British Military Administration (Malaya); Straits Settlements	Federation of Malaya; Malacca
- Today part of: Malaysia

Malacca was a British Crown colony from 1946 to 1957. It came under British sovereignty after the signing of the Anglo-Dutch Treaty of 1824, and was part of the Straits Settlements until 1946.

During World War II, it was occupied by the Japanese from 1942 to 1945. Following the disbandment of the Straits Settlements in the aftermath of World War II, Penang and Malacca evolved into Crown colonies within the Federation of Malaya, while Singapore transformed into an individual Crown colony distinct from Malaya. In 1955, Tunku Abdul Rahman held a meeting with the British to discuss the end of British rule in Malacca with a merger with Malayan Union (which was then replaced by Federation of Malaya). On 31 August 1957, when Malaya achieved its independence from the United Kingdom, Malacca was integrated as part of the federation, which was later known as Malaysia when it merged with the territories in British Borneo.

== Resident Commissioners ==
- Sep 1945 – 31 Mar 1946, James Calder (acting)
- 1946 – Nov 1947, Edward Victor Grace Day
- 24 Nov 1947 – 7 Mar 1949, John Falconer
- 1949, William Cecil Taylor
- 25 Oct 1949 – 1954, George Evans Cameron Wisdom
- 20 Dec 1950 – 9 Jan 1951, Jonathan Edgar Meredith Cave, acting for Wisdom
- 20 Dec 1951 – 6 Jan 1952, Jonathan Edgar Meredith Cave, acting for Wisdom
- 18 Apr 1952 – 21 Oct 1952, Harold George Hammett
- 21 Apr 1954 – 31 Aug 1957, Harold George Hammett
- 28 Aug 1954 – 15 Sep 1954, Fulwar Rupert Caven Fowle, acting for Hammett
- 25 Sep 1956 – Feb 1957, Maurice John Hayward, acting for Hammett
- 1957, Albert William Nicholson

== See also ==
- Crown Colony of Penang
