= George Wisdom =

British colonial administrator (1899–1958)

George Evan Cameron Wisdom CMG
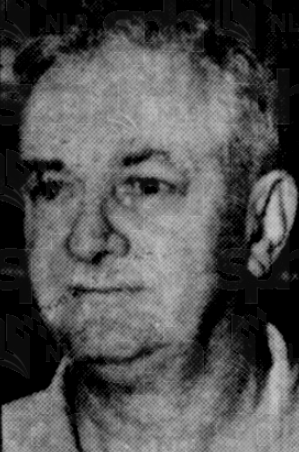
- Wisdom in 1954

Resident Commissioner of Malacca, Federation of Malaya
- In office 1949–1954
- Preceded by: William Cecil Taylor
- Succeeded by: Harold George Hammett

Personal details
- Born: 24 December 1899
- Died: 25 May 1958 (aged 58) Edenbridge, Kent
- Children: 2
- Occupation: Colonial administrator

George Evan Cameron Wisdom (24 December 1899 – 25 May 1958) was a British colonial administrator who served as Resident Commissioner of the British Crown Colony of Malacca, Federation of Malaya, from 1949 to 1954.

== Early life and education ==
Wisdom was born on 24 December 1899, the son of George Wisdom and Ethel Evans. He was educated at Prince Edward School, Salisbury, Southern Rhodesia and Oxford University.

== Career ==
After serving with the Royal Air Force during World War I in Europe between 1917 and 1920, Wisdom joined the British Colonial Service and was an officer in government administration for 18 years in the Gold Coast. In 1937, Wisdom was serving as Lieutenant in the Gold Coast Defence Force. During World War II, he served in North Africa and the Far East from 1942 to 1945, and reached the rank of Colonel.

After the War, Wisdom went to Malaya in 1945 as a senior affairs officer with the British Military Administration and served in various posts including Deputy Resident Commissioner of Province Wellesley; acting Resident Commissioner of Penang, and Resident Commissioner of Pahang. In 1949, he was appointed Resident Commissioner of Malacca. He also served as President of the Municipality. During his five years in the post he was responsible for many improvements in the settlement. In 1950, the new Malacca Airport was opened at Batu Berendam. He oversaw the construction of a new sports stadium (today known as Hang Tuah Stadium) and the founding of a sports committee established to promote sport. He also actively sponsored youth and welfare work including that of the Red Cross. He played a prominent role in the preservation of the settlement's heritage and was instrumental in the establishment of a museum. He remained in the post until he retired from the service in 1954.

== Personal life and death ==
Wisdom married Dorothea Rodwell in 1927 and they had two sons.

Wisdom died suddenly on 25 May 1958 at Edenbridge, Kent, aged 57.

== Honours ==
Wisdom was appointed Companion of the Order of St Michael and St George (CMG) in the 1954 New Year Honours.
