= Flag of Malacca =

Malaysian state flag

Malacca
- Use: Civil and state flag
- Proportion: 1:2
- Adopted: 1957
- Design: Two equal bands of red and white, with a yellow crescent and five-pointed star in a blue canton.

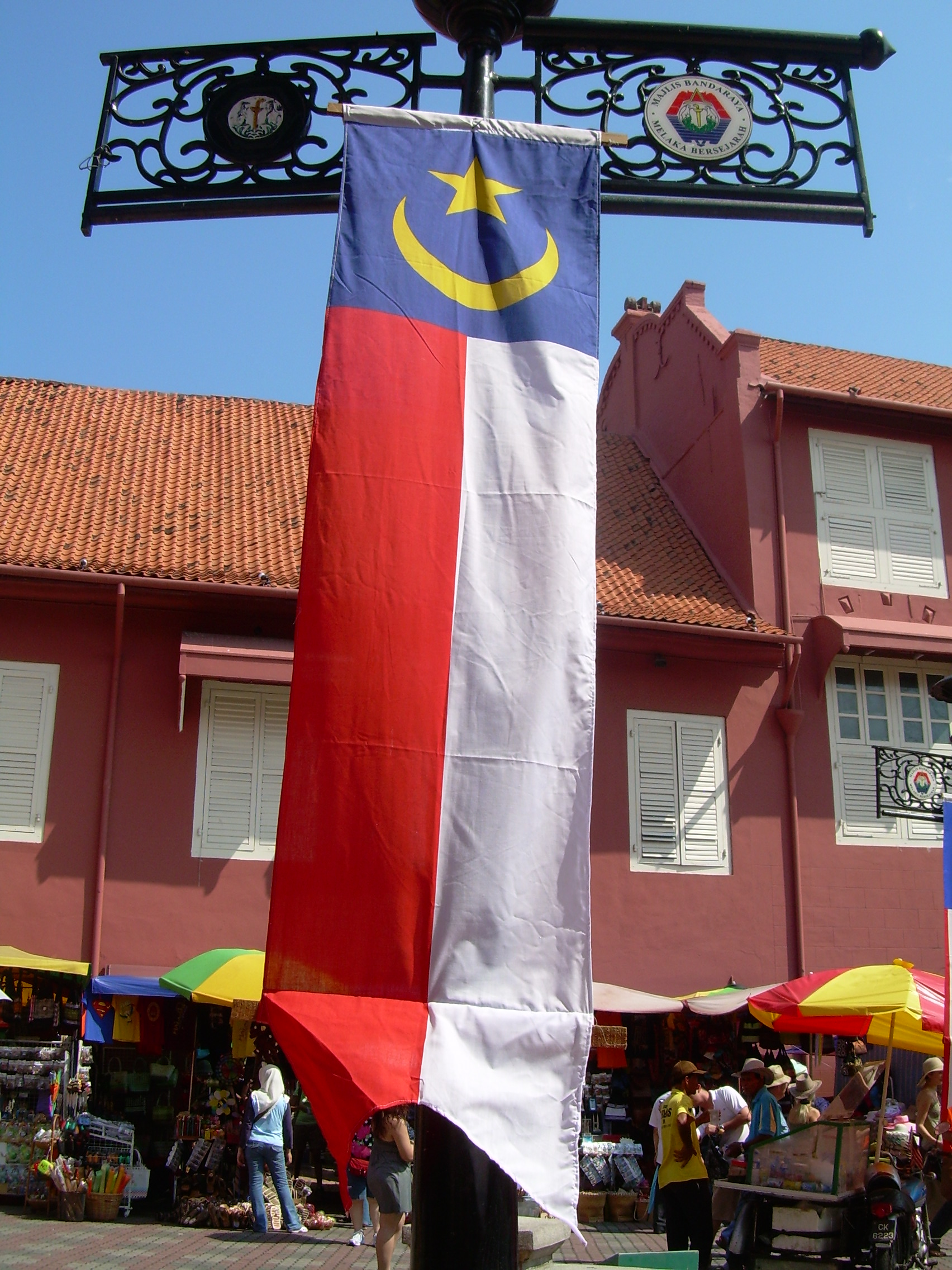
The state banner hung on a lamp post near the Stadthuys complex.

The Flag of Malacca consists of two horizontal bands of equal width in red and white, with a yellow crescent and five-pointed star in a blue canton. Red, white, yellow and blue – the colours of the flag of Malaysia, are used in the flag of Malacca to emphasize that Malacca is a member state of Malaysia. The star and crescent represents Islam, the official religion of the State and of the nation. This flag was adopted by the then Settlement Council on 16 July 1957 in preparation for the independence of Malaya.

== History ==
Prior to the British rule in 1824, there was no known flag representing Malacca. The first known representation of Malacca on a flag was as one of the three crowns on the flag of the Straits Settlements in use between 1877 and 1946. Following the dissolution of the Straits Settlements and the admission of Malacca as a Crown colony within the Malayan Union, there appears to be little clarity as to what flag Malacca used between Straits Settlement dissolution in April 1946 and the eventual adoption of a blue ensign defaced by the 1951 arms.

== Timeline of flags ==
Flag	Duration	Political Entity	Description
	1868–1877	Straits Settlements	Adopted as part of the Straits Settlements.
	1877–1904	Straits Settlements	Continued under Straits Settlements administration.
	1904–1925	Straits Settlements	Updated colonial flag.
	1925–1942	Straits Settlements	Pre-Japanese WWII administration.
	1945–1946	Straits Settlements	British returned post-Japan.
	1946–1951	Crown Colony of Malacca	Standard Union Jack for administration.
	1951–1957	Crown Colony of Malacca	Adopted in 1951 alongside the coat of arms granted to the settlement by a Royal Warrant of King George VI dated 14 August 1951.
	1957–present	Malacca	State flag after Malayan independence.
