= Unity makes strength =

Motto of many countries throughout history

Coat of arms of Belgium (middle version)

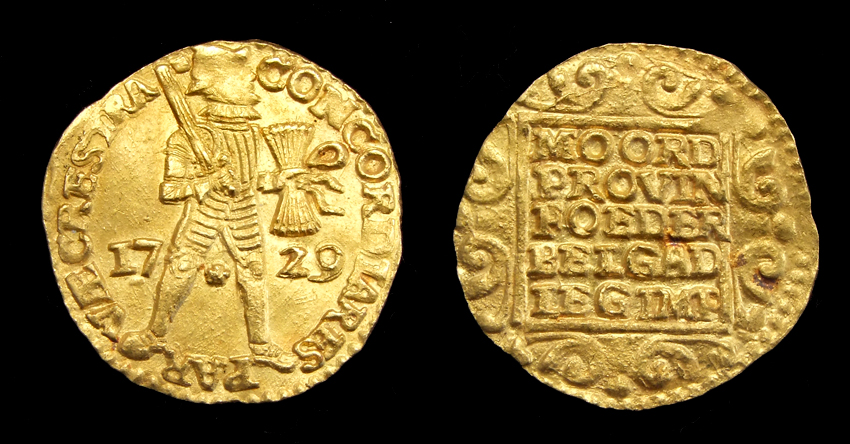
Netherlands, gold ducat (1729) with the motto concordia res parvae crescunt on the obverse, found in the Dutch East India Company (VOC) shipwreck 't Vliegend Hert

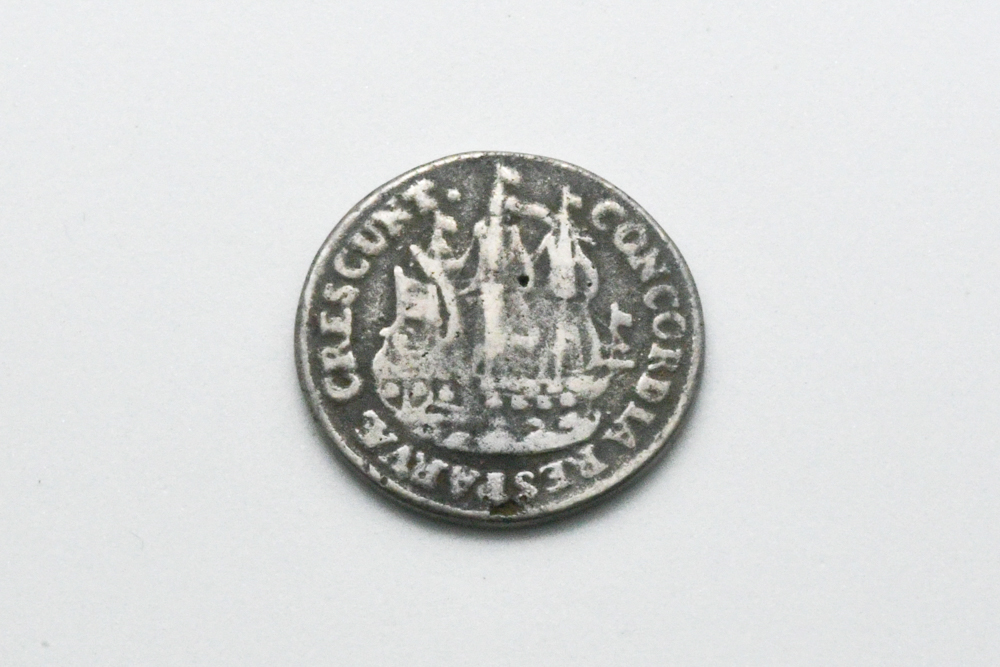
Token coin found in Borneo with the motto concordia res parvae crescunt

"Unity makes strength" (Note: Bulgarian: Съединението прави силата, romanized: Săedinenieto pravi silata; Dutch: Eendracht maakt macht [ˈeːndrɑxt maːkt ˈmɑxt]; French: L'union fait la force [lynjɔ̃ fɛ la fɔʁs]; German: Einigkeit macht stark [ˈaɪnɪçkaɪt maxt ˈʃtaʁk].) is a motto that has been used by various states and entities throughout history. It is used by Belgium, Bulgaria, Malaysia, Haiti and Georgia, Brooklyn on their coats of arms and is the national motto of Belgium, Bolivia, Malaysia, Georgia and Bulgaria.

The phrase was first used as national motto by the Dutch Republic. However its use predates the republic's independence, appearing for example as part of mottos and proverbs known as Gemeene Duytsche Spreekwoorden, which was published in 1550, back when the place was under the Habsburg empire of Charles V, which ruled over modern day Netherlands and Belgium. This was derived originally from a Greek phrase (ἰσχύς ἐν τῇ ἕνώσει, iskhús en têi henṓsei, lit. 'power lies in unity') attributed to Homer, dating to roughly 850 BC, that later appears similarly in the Latin phrase concordia res parvae crescunt ("small things flourish by concord"), which was used in the Bellum Jugurthinum of Roman Republican writer Sallust.

The similar moral of the Aesopic fable "The Old Man and his Sons" has been rendered in various related ways: "All power is weak unless united" (1668), "Unity makes strength, strife wastes" (1685), "Strength lies in union" (1867), "Strength is in unity" (1887), "Unity is strength" (title), "Union gives strength" (moral) (1894), "Union is strength" (1912), "In unity is strength" (1919); although older versions are more specific: "Brotherly love is the greatest good in life and often lifts the humble higher" (2nd century), "Just as concord supplies potency in human affairs, so a quarrelsome life deprives people of their strength" (16th century).

== Origins ==
=== Ancient Greek ===
The Iliad 13:237 has συμφερτὴ δ᾽ ἀρετὴ πέλει ἀνδρῶν καὶ μάλα λυγρῶν, sumphertḕ d' aretḕ pélei andrôn kaì mála lugrôn, lit. 'even weak men have strength in unity'.

=== Latin ===
One Latin version is vis unita fortior 'force united is stronger'. It was the original state motto of New Hampshire.

== Uses ==
=== Belgium ===
coat of arms of Belgium (lesser version)

The motto was used by Belgium after its Revolution of 1830, initially only in its French form "L'union fait la force". Only when Dutch was made equal in status to French did the Belgian state also take "Eendracht maakt macht" as its motto, sometimes with the variant "Eenheid baart macht". In 1830, this unity was identified with the unification of Belgium's nine provinces, whose nine provincial coats of arms are represented on the national arms, and the new country's unification of its liberal progressives and Catholic conservatives. Indeed, it was launched in 1827–1828 by newspapers published in Liège, which allied liberals and Catholics in the unionism which brought about the revolution and which then dominated Belgian politics until the founding of the Liberal Party in 1846. Although the motto is often used in Belgicist or unitarist circles (as a call to Flemings and Walloons, natives of Brussels and German speakers, all to maintain Belgium's unity), this is a historical misinterpretation; the motto is a unionist – not a unitarist – slogan. Its German version is "Einigkeit macht stark".

=== Bulgaria ===
"Unity makes strength" (Съединението прави силата), the motto on the coat of arms of Bulgaria

Following the Bulgarian unification and after Ferdinand of the House of Saxe-Coburg and Gotha took over the throne of the Principality of Bulgaria, the country adopted the motto (Bulgarian: Съединението прави силата, romanized: Sŭedinenieto pravi silata) - Unity makes strength. It was the country's motto until 1948. After the fall of the People's Republic of Bulgaria and the end of Communist rule in the 1990s, the parties debated what should be the country's new coat of arms, deciding on a modified version of its former royal coat of arms. However, the Bulgarian motto also represents the legendary last words of khan Kubrat, the founder of Old Great Bulgaria in 632 AD, and is likely rooted much earlier in Bulgarian symbolics than in other European states.

=== Canada ===
At the second national convention of Acadians in 1884, "L'union fait la force" was chosen as the national motto of Acadia and appeared in the coat of arms of Société nationale de l'Acadie in 1995.

=== Georgia ===
Dzala ertobashia (Georgian: ძალა ერთობაშია, "strength is in unity") is the official motto of Georgia.

=== Haiti ===
coat of arms of Haiti

One of the oldest uses of the term written in the French language, is known since 1807, on Haiti's national coat of arms bearing the motto, "L'union fait la force". Although, it should not be confused with the national motto of Haiti, which according to the Constitution of Haiti is "Liberty, Equality, Fraternity."

=== Malaysia ===
Coat of arms of Malaysia

The coat of arms of the Federation of Malaya (present day Peninsular Malaysia) in used between 1948 and 1963 adopted a variation of the motto, rendered "Unity is Strength" in English and "Bersekutu Bertambah Mutu" (literally "Federation Improves Quality") in Malay Jawi script. Following the formation of Malaysia in 1963, the English motto was replaced by "Bersekutu Bertambah Mutu" in Malay Latin (Rumi) script, while the Jawi motto remained unchanged.

=== Netherlands ===
Former coat of arms of the Netherlands (Dutch Republic)

This was the motto of the Dutch Republic (1581-1795) and during most of the Napoleonic times (1802–10). It continued to be used in the country until 1816 when it was replaced by the current Dutch motto Je maintiendrai. "Unity makes strength" was recorded for the first time in the Netherlands in the book Gemeene Duytsche Spreekwoorden ("Common Dutch Proverbs") in 1550, whilst the area was still within the Spanish Empire and under the rule of Charles V. After the Dutch gained independence, the new Dutch Republic took over the phrase as its motto and it appeared on several of its coins and coats of arms, usually in the original Latin form, Concordia res parvae crescunt (literally "together the small will grow"), referring to the new state's initially small territorial size. From the late 16th century onwards the start of the motto was frequently used on Dutch coinage, such as the Leicester-rijksdaalder in 1586.

The French occupied the Netherlands from 1795 to 1813, first as the Batavian Republic, then the Kingdom of Holland, then as an annexed part of France itself. Early in the occupation the national motto was changed to "Gelykheid, Vryheid, Broederschap" (Equality, Liberty, Fraternity), but from 1802 to 1810 'Unity makes strength' was re-introduced. It remained in use until the institution of the United Kingdom of the Netherlands when, in 1816, it switched to the House of Orange motto Je maintiendrai.

Today "Unity makes strength" ("Eendracht maakt macht") is still used by the Dutch football club PSV Eindhoven.

=== South Africa ===
coat of arms of the South African Republic

On 17 January 1852, the United Kingdom, ruler of the Cape Colony, approved the independence of the South African Republic in the Sand River Convention. "Eendragt maakt magt" was the motto on the new state's shield, and in 1888 it decided it should only use high Dutch (not Afrikaans) as its only official language. Rendered in Latin, the motto of the Union of South Africa from 1910 until 1961 was "Ex Unitate Vires" ("Out of Unity, Strength"). After 1961, as the Republic of South Africa, the motto was rendered on coins in both Afrikaans (as "Eendrag maak mag") and in English (as "Unity is Strength"). The motto was changed in 2000 to "ǃke e: ǀxarra ǁke", which is "Unity in diversity" written in ǀXam.

=== United States ===
The motto of Brooklyn, a borough of New York City founded by Dutch settlers, is "Een Draght Mackt Maght". It appears on Brooklyn's seal and flag. Additionally, it is the motto of The Collegiate School, the oldest primary and secondary school in the United States. The motto Eendragt maakt magt also appears on the badge of the police force of Holland, Michigan, combined with God zij met ons, but written as God Zy Met Ons ("God be with us").

== Other uses ==
Eendragt maakt Magt was a noble-society (Heeren-Sociëteit) founded in Rotterdam in 1830, originally based in the Kralingse Plaslaan. It originally held weekly meetings in the Den Otter coffeehouse on the corner of the Hoflaan and the Honingerdijk. On 1 May 1865, the Association of Shareholders began fundraising for a private building for the society. This coincided with the fiftieth anniversary of the Battle of Waterloo, which was one reason the society took the motto of king William II of the Netherlands. The architect Jan Verheul designed the new building, and it opened in 1903 on the corner of the Oudedijk and Waterloostraat. In 1980, the building was demolished to make way for the Caland Line metro route. A section of its ornate Art Nouveau facade (with the club's name between glazed tiles and leaf patterns) was preserved and built into the nearby Voorschoterlaan station.

The name was also used as the business name of the tailors "Eendracht maakt macht", who in 1910 decided to rent a building on Oranjeboomstraat in Rotterdam, as a joint workshop-office to move their office out of their home. The fine dust from the finished goods caused many to suffer from emphysema and a larger workplace named "Eendracht maakt macht" was built.

The motto was also used by Helena Blavatsky in her editorials, in response to the internal feuding which often affected the Theosophical Society.

The motto also appears on the historic crest of the Reformed Church in America (RCA), reflecting the denomination’s Dutch Reformed heritage. The RCA, founded in 1628 by settlers of the Dutch colony of New Netherland, retained the Dutch language and many cultural symbols well into the 18th century. The inclusion of Eendragt maakt macht on its crest expresses the church’s emphasis on unity within the body of Christ and continuity with its origins in the Dutch Reformation.

The motto of the fascist British government in the Doctor Who serial Inferno, mainly set in an alternate world, was "Unity is Strength," based on the slogan "Union is Strength" used by Oswald Mosley's contemporary Union Movement. Similarly, Norsefire, the fascist British government in the 2005 film V for Vendetta uses "Strength through Unity" (along with "Unity through Faith") as a prominent slogan.

In the 20th century, "L'Union Fait La Force" was the motto of and adorned emblems of the Union Saint-Jean-Baptiste d’Amérique, at one time the largest French Catholic fraternal organization in the United States.

The Latin form concordia res parvae crescunt is used by various institutions: the Ateneum in Helsinki, Finland; the former mortgage society in Riga, Latvia (now the Foreign Ministry).

== See also ==
- E pluribus unum
- Skilurus, a legendary Scythian king who taught the same moral by instructing his sons to break a bundle of arrows
- "Workers of the world, unite!"
