= Flag and coat of arms of Kuala Lumpur =

Symbols of the Malaysian capital city

The Flag and coat of arms of Kuala Lumpur are two major symbols that serve as the visual identity of Kuala Lumpur, the capital city and one of the three federal territories (along with Labuan and Putrajaya) of Malaysia.

== Flag ==
Federal Territory of Kuala Lumpur
- Proportion: 1:2
- Adopted: 14 May 1990; 36 years ago
- Design: A blue field with seven horizontal stripes alternating red and white on upper and lower lengths; charged with a yellow crescent and fourteen-pointed star in the hoist side.
- Designed by: Azmi Ahmad Termizi

The flag of Kuala Lumpur was officially adopted on 14 May 1990 to commemorate the Kuala Lumpur City Hall's 100 years as the local authority of Kuala Lumpur. The flag was designed as a variant to Jalur Gemilang, the Flag of Malaysia, incorporating design elements with its own identity as one of the Federal Territories of the nation. The flag is flown annually on the first day of February, commemorating the day when Kuala Lumpur became a Federal Territory on 1 February 1974.

=== History ===
Before the adoption of the current flag, Kuala Lumpur does not have its own city or territorial flag, although its City Hall had a plain white flag charged with its emblem (this was replaced by the city coat of arms in 1992) in the centre.

The flag designer was Azmi Ahmad Termizi, a DBKL architect and planner who was among the team assigned to design a flag to commemorate 100 years of DBKL's role as the local authority of Kuala Lumpur. Submitting fifteen designs to the management, four of them were shortlisted and presented to Prime Minister Mahathir Mohamad for approval. The winning design was approved on 24 April 1990. On the night of 14 May 1990, a symbolic ceremony was held where the new flag was received from the Yang di-Pertuan Agong Sultan Azlan Shah by the Lord Mayor (Datuk Bandar) of Kuala Lumpur Tan Sri Elyas Omar, after which the flag has been in official use until now.

=== Design ===
Azmi's design incorporates elements of the national flag into the flag of Kuala Lumpur. The flag is a blue field with seven equal horizontal alternating stripes of red and white on upper and lower length of the flag, charged with a yellow crescent moon facing, towards the fly, a yellow 14-pointed star.

According to the Malaysian Ministry of Information website, each design symbolises a particular identity. The red symbolises the city's courage and strength, the blue for the unity of its multiracial citizens, the yellow for sovereignty, and the white for cleanliness and beauty.

=== Usage ===
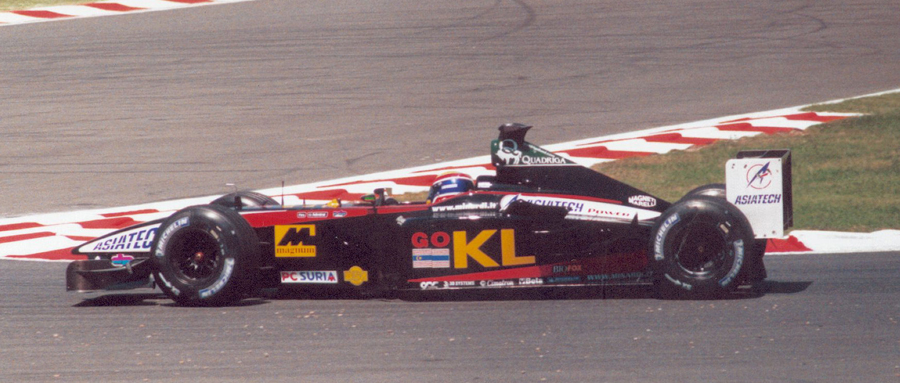
The Minardi PS02 displays KL flag which driven by Mark Webber.

- The Minardi PS02 livery displays the Kuala Lumpur flag.

== City hall coat of arms ==
Coat of arms of Kuala Lumpur
- Armiger: Kuala Lumpur City Hall
- Adopted: 1992
- Supporters: On either side a ribbon argent, glues and azure with a wreath of hibiscus flowers
- Motto: Dewan Bandaraya Kuala Lumpur (Kuala Lumpur City Hall)

The coat of arms of Kuala Lumpur City Hall, adopted on 31 January 1992, is a modification of the coat of arms of its former municipal council designed by British architect C.O. Jennings in 1951. The original coat of arms are as described: Gules, a chevron charged with five fruits of a rubber-tree, between three krisses 2 and 1 proper.

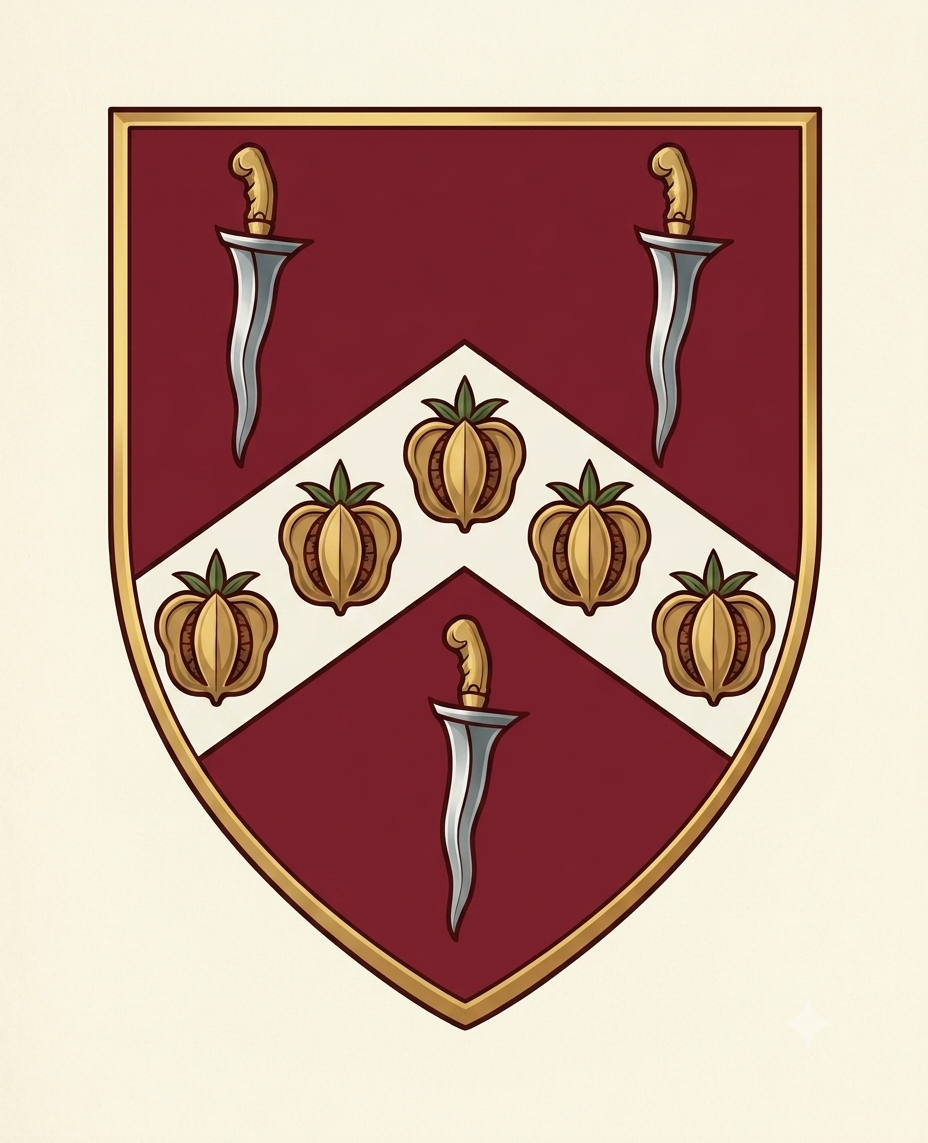

The current coat of arms incorporates the city's emblem in use since Kuala Lumpur became a city in 1972. The city's emblem consists of three interlocked hexagons with various symbols inside, clockwise from top to bottom:

Emblem of Kuala Lumpur

- The first one, blue with crescent and federal star represents Kuala Lumpur as the Federal Capital;
- The second one, yellow with interlaced ringgit or dollar signs ($) represents Kuala Lumpur as the commercial centre; (Note: In 1993, the dollar sign has been replaced by 'RM' as the symbol of Malaysian ringgit.) and
- The third one, green with an atom symbol and an open book represents Kuala Lumpur as the centre for culture and education.

Other features of the coat of arms include:

- A pair of inverted crossed krisses in front of the tiger's head (couped) as crest;
- A shield charged with red, white and blue chevrons; and
- Two branches of hibiscus plants with flowers wraped up by ribbons with red, white and blue stripes as supporters.

The city's emblem bears the name "Kuala Lumpur" at the top and the motto "Maju dan Makmur" (Progress and Prosper) at the bottom. Although the 1992 information book published by the Kuala Lumpur City Hall suggested the use of this emblem by Kuala Lumpur residents, it is rarely seen on public display nowadays.

A variation of the coat of arms with two yellow rice stalks, a yellow federal star and crescent and the blue scroll with the motto Tegas dan Setia in Romanised Malay (meaning Serious and Loyal) is reserved for use by the Enforcement Department of the City Hall. Additionally, the Enforcement Department also has a separate flag from the city hall, consists of three horizontal stripes of blue, red and green separated by white fimbriations with the department's coat of arms in the centre.

The coat of arms of the former municipal council consisted of the tiger's head couped, fimbriations of red and white, a helm and shield and a scroll inscribed with Jawi motto. The shield was blazoned: Gules, a chevron argent charged with five fruits of a rubber tree proper, between three krisses in pale point downwards two and one also proper. A lesser version of the arms without the tiger's head, red and white fimbriations and helm was also used by the municipal council.
