= Federal territories of Malaysia =

Territories administered by Federal Government of Malaysia

Federal Territories Wilayah Persekutuan (Malay)
- Flag Seal
- Motto(s): Maju dan Sejahtera "Progressive and Prosperous"
- Anthem: Wilayah Persekutuan Maju dan Sejahtera "The Progressive and Prosperous Federal Territory"
- Federal territories: Kuala Lumpur; Labuan; Putrajaya
- Designated: Kuala Lumpur: 1 February 1974; Labuan: 16 April 1984; Putrajaya: 1 February 2001
- Consolidated under the Ministry: 27 March 2004

Government
  - Minister: Hannah Yeoh
  - Director General: Dato' Indera Noridah binti Abdul Rahim

Area
  - Total: 381.65 km^{2} (147.36 sq mi)

Population (Q4 2023)
  - Total: 2,265,100
  - Density: 5,935.0/km^{2} (15,372/sq mi)
- National postal code: Kuala Lumpur; 50xxx to 60xxx 68xxx (Ampang and Selayang); Labuan; 87xxx Putrajaya; 62xxx
- Area codes: 03^{a} 087^{b}
- Administered by the: Federal Territories Department
- License plate: Kuala Lumpur; W and V Labuan; L Putrajaya; PUTRAJAYA and F
- Website: kwp.gov.my
- ^{a} Kuala Lumpur and Putrajaya^{b} Labuan

The federal territories (FT; Malay: Wilayah Persekutuan) in Malaysia comprise three territories—Kuala Lumpur, Labuan, and Putrajaya—governed directly by the Federal Government of Malaysia. Kuala Lumpur is the national capital of Malaysia, Putrajaya is the administrative capital, and Labuan is an offshore international financial centre. Kuala Lumpur and Putrajaya are enclaves in the state of Selangor. Labuan is an island off the coast of the Sabah state.

== Administrations ==
The territories fall under the jurisdiction of the Department of Federal Territories. Originally, the Federal Territory (FT) Ministry was established in 1979 and was in charge of planning and administration of Kuala Lumpur and Klang Valley. In 1981, the FT Ministry was re-established under the Prime Minister's Department as the Planning Unit of Klang Valley. In 2004, the FT Ministry was again formed into a full-fledged ministry which focused on the development of Kuala Lumpur, Labuan and Putrajaya. In 2022, under Prime Minister Anwar Ibrahim's administration, the ministry was scrapped and its functions delegated to other ministries. Currently, the federal territories are administered by the Department of the Federal Territories (Jabatan Wilayah Persekutuan) under the Prime Minister's Department.

== History ==
The federal territories were originally part of two states: Selangor and Sabah. Both Kuala Lumpur and Putrajaya were part of Selangor and Labuan was part of Sabah.

Kuala Lumpur, the state capital of Selangor at the time, became the national capital of the Federation of Malaya (and later Malaysia) in 1948. Since independence in 1957, the federal as well as the Selangor state ruling party had been the Alliance (later the Barisan Nasional). However, in the 1969 elections the Alliance, while retaining control of the federal government, lost its majority in Selangor to the opposition. The same election resulted in a major race riot in Kuala Lumpur.

It was realised that if Kuala Lumpur remained part of Selangor, clashes between the federal government and Selangor state government might arise when they are controlled by different parties. The solution was to separate Kuala Lumpur from the state and place it under direct federal rule. On 1 February 1974, the Federal Territory of Kuala Lumpur Agreement was signed, and Kuala Lumpur became the first federal territory of Malaysia.

The cession of Kuala Lumpur secured the Selangor state government for the Barisan Nasional until the 2008 general election. The separation of Kuala Lumpur meant that Kuala Lumpur voters lost representation in the Selangor State Legislative Assembly and could only vote for representation in the Parliament of Malaysia.

Labuan, an island off the coast of mainland Sabah, was chosen by the federal government for development into an offshore financial centre. Labuan became the second federal territory on 16 April 1984.

Putrajaya is a planned city, designed to replace Kuala Lumpur as the seat of the federal government. Sultan Salahuddin of Selangor, who was serving as the Yang di-Pertuan Agong at that time, was asked again to cede land to the federal government. Putrajaya became the third federal territory on 1 February 2001.

In recent years, efforts have been made to forge a common identity for the three federal territories. A flag of the Federal Territories was introduced on 23 May 2006 to represent the federal territories as a whole. During the 2006 Sukma Games in Kedah, Kuala Lumpur, Labuan, and Putrajaya (never competed) debuted as a unified Federal Territories team.

== Symbols ==
Maju dan Sejahtera (lit. 'Progress and Prosperity') is the official anthem of the federal territories.

In addition to the flag of federal territories, each federal territory also has its own flag.

Flag of Kuala Lumpur

Flag of Labuan

Flag of Putrajaya

== Sports ==
Since 2006, sport activities in all three federal territories are governed and coordinated by the Federal Territory Sports Council (Malay: Majlis Sukan Wilayah Persekutuan, WIPERS), a federal statutory body.

== Holidays ==
In addition to federal public holidays, all three federal territories celebrate Federal Territory Day. Labuan, with a significant Kadazan-Dusun community, celebrates Kaamatan with the neighbouring state of Sabah.

== Federal Parliament seats ==
The federal territories representatives in the Federal Parliament (Dewan Rakyat) since the 15th general election are:

Parliament	Seat Name	Member of Parliament	Party	Area
P114	Kepong	Lim Lip Eng	Pakatan Harapan (DAP)	Kuala Lumpur
P115	Batu	Prabakaran Parameswaran	Pakatan Harapan (PKR)	Kuala Lumpur
P116	Wangsa Maju	Zahir Hassan	Pakatan Harapan (PKR)	Kuala Lumpur
P117	Segambut	Hannah Yeoh Tseow Suan	Pakatan Harapan (DAP)	Kuala Lumpur
P118	Setiawangsa	Nik Nazmi Nik Ahmad	Pakatan Harapan (PKR)	Kuala Lumpur
P119	Titiwangsa (Maluri)	Johari Abdul Ghani	Barisan Nasional (UMNO)	Kuala Lumpur
P120	Bukit Bintang (KL Central Business District)	Fong Kui Lun	Pakatan Harapan (DAP)	Kuala Lumpur
P121	Lembah Pantai	Ahmad Fahmi Mohamed Fadzil	Pakatan Harapan (PKR)	Kuala Lumpur
P122	Seputeh (Old Klang Road)	Teresa Kok Suh Sim	Pakatan Harapan (DAP)	Kuala Lumpur
P123	Cheras	Tan Kok Wai	Pakatan Harapan (DAP)	Kuala Lumpur
P124	Bandar Tun Razak (Bandar Tasik Selatan)	Wan Azizah Wan Ismail	Pakatan Harapan (PKR)	Kuala Lumpur
P125	Putrajaya	Mohd Radzi Md Jidin	Perikatan Nasional (PPBM)	Putrajaya
P166	Labuan	Suhaili Abdul Rahman	Independent	Labuan

== See also ==
- Federal Territories
