= Flag of Sabah =

Flag of the Malaysian state of Sabah

- Use: Civil and state flag
- Proportion: 1:2
- Adopted: 16 September 1988; 38 years ago
- Design: Red, white and three different shades of blue
- Designed by: Yaman Ahmad Mus

The flag of Sabah, a state of Malaysia, was adopted on 16 September 1988, the 25th anniversary of the formation of the Malaysian Federation. It is red, white and three different shades of blue. The mountain is in the canton as in the 1963 flag, but now in dark blue on a light blue background. The field is medium blue over white over red. The mountain shown on the flag (and the state's coat of arms) is Mount Kinabalu.

The five different colours represent the five divisions in Sabah.

- A silhouette of Mount Kinabalu represents the state of Sabah.
- Zircon blue represents peace and calmness.
- Icicle blue represents unity and prosperity.
- Royal blue represents strength and harmony.
- White represents purity and justice.
- Chilli red represents courage and determination.

== Symbolism ==
=== First Sabah state flag (1963–1981) ===
On 31 August 1963, Sabah adopted a four-striped flag (red over white over yellow over blue) with a green canton and a brown mountain – symbol of Mount Kinabalu. It was designed by Idris Echin, a Land and Survey Department architect who hailed from Jesselton (now Kota Kinabalu). The green canton represents the State's young land and forests, while Mount Kinabalu brown in colour represents the people's unity. The red stripe represents courage and the willingness to sacrifice for the country, white represents purity, yellow represents state's riches and blue represents peace and happiness.

=== Second Sabah state flag (1982–1988) ===
The second flag design was created in 1981 by the Sabah People's United Front Party (BERJAYA)-led state government, and was formally adopted on 1 January 1982, the day Peninsular Malaysia aligned its time with that of Sabah and Sarawak to create a unified Malaysia Standard Time. It had a completely different design from the previous one: blue over white with a red triangle on the hoist. It is similar to the Trisakti flag used by the neighbouring state of Sarawak until 31 August 1988, which was red over white with a blue triangle on the hoist. The state government explained that red represents courage and aspiration, blue stands for peace and progress and white for sincerity and truth. The change was made reportedly because the Mount Kinabalu was also the symbol of the United Sabah National Organisation. The decision to exclude Mount Kinabalu from the flag at that time did not enjoy support from majority of the Sabah populace.

== Historical flags ==
Flag of North Borneo (1882–1902)

Flag of North Borneo (1902–1942 and 1945–1946).

Civil ensign of North Borneo (1882–1902)

Civil ensign of North Borneo (1902–1942 and 1945–1946).

Flag of the governor of North Borneo (1882–1903).

Flag of the governor of North Borneo (1903–1915).

Flag of the governor of North Borneo (1915–1946).

Flag of the Crown Colony of North Borneo (1948–1963).

Civil ensign of the Crown Colony of North Borneo (1948–1963).

Flag of the governor of North Borneo (1948–1963).

Flag of the state of Sabah (1963–1981).

Flag of the state of Sabah (1982–1988).

State flag of Sabah in current use.

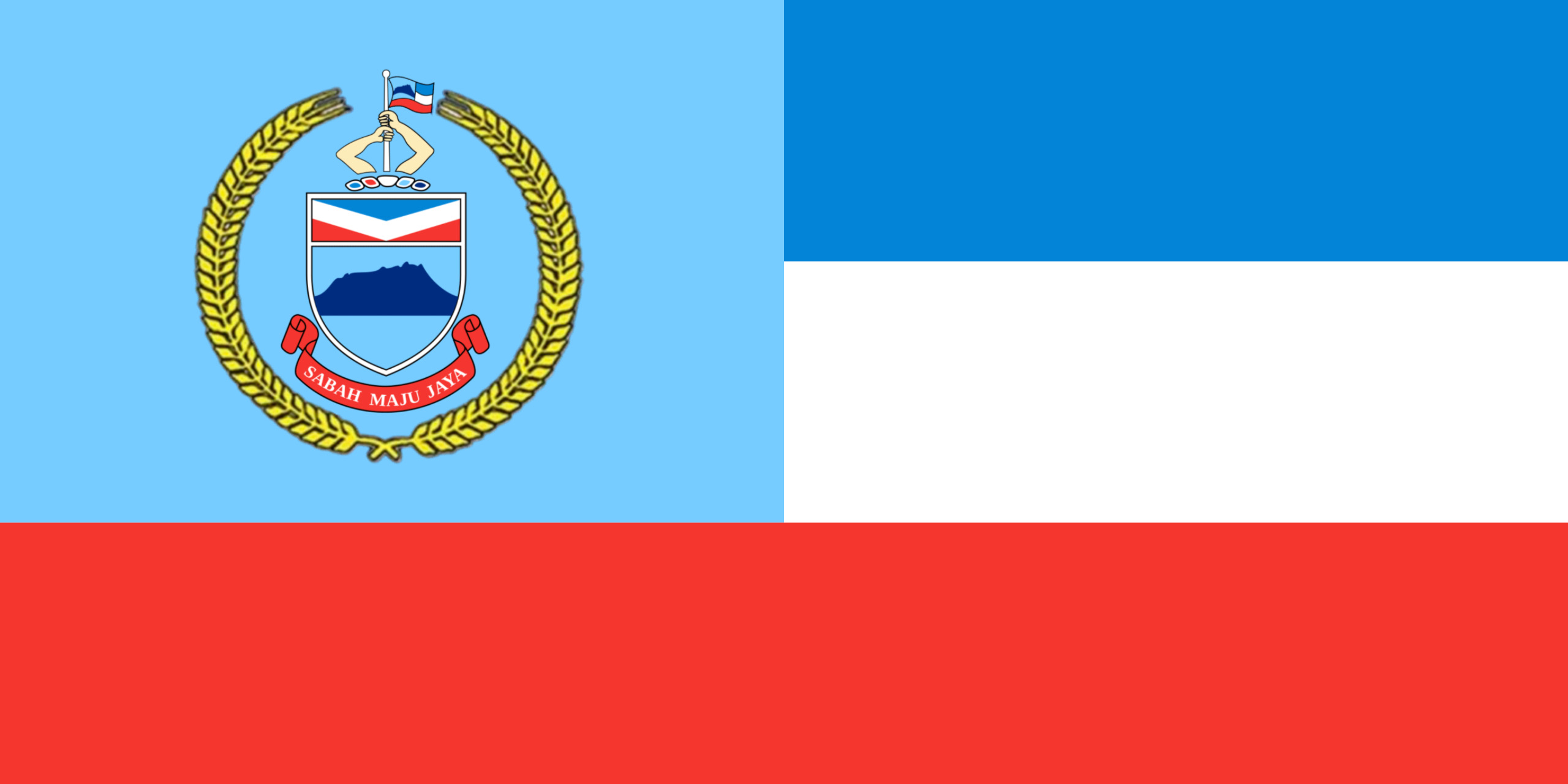
The flag of Sabah used by the Yang di-Pertua Negeri.

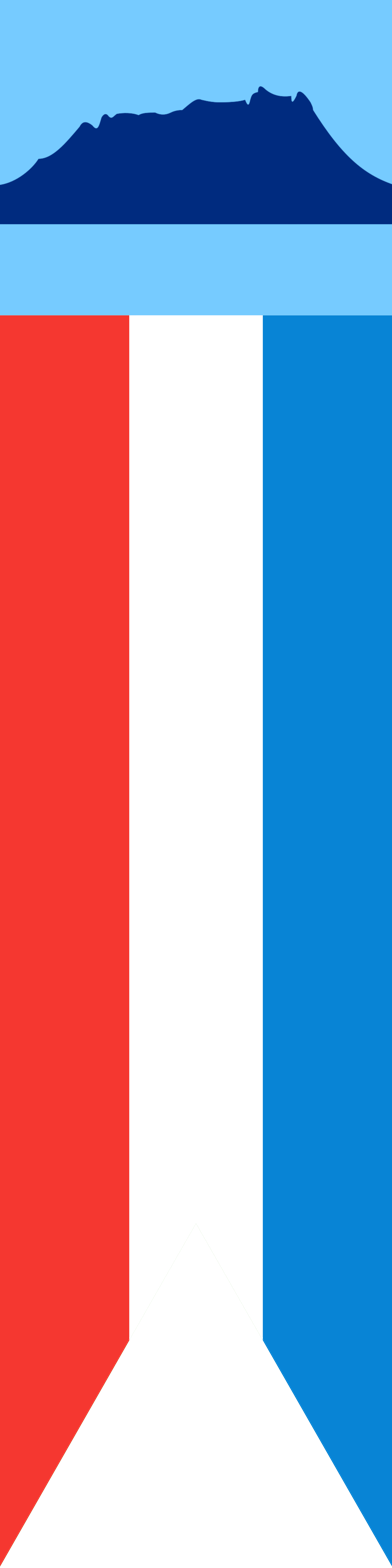
Banner of Sabah

== City flags ==
City	Flag	Description
Kota Kinabalu		Four horizontal bands of red, white, yellow and green and a light blue canton with a dark blue silhouette of Mount Kinabalu.

== See also ==
- Coat of arms of Sabah
