= Coat of arms of Sarawak =

Symbol of the Malaysian state

- Armiger: Sarawak
- Adopted: 1988
- Shield: Sarawak State Flag Proper
- Supporters: A rhinoceros hornbill proper displayed, clutching a scroll of state motto
- Motto: Sarawak on the smaller scroll, Bersatu, Berusaha, Berbakti ("Unity, Effort, Service") on the larger scroll
- Other elements: Two mirrored branches of Bunga Raya (Hibiscus flower) proper

The present coat of arms of Sarawak is largely based on the second state coat of arms, which was granted on 31 August 1973.

== Current coat of arms of Sarawak ==
The current coat of arms was established on 31 August 1988. The shield features a symbolic wing-spread Kenyalang or rhinoceros hornbill with the shield bearing the state flag. The hornbill's wings have 13 feathers, which represent the states in Malaysia. The Hibiscus represent the Malaysia's national flower which appears on the right and left sides of the bird's legs and the hornbill perches a banner bearing the words "Bersatu, Berusaha, Berbakti" which means 'Unity, Effort, Service'.

== Past coat of arms ==
Coat of arms of the Raj of Sarawak
Description The heraldic arms of the Brooke dynasty of the Raj of Sarawak were based on the emblem used by James Brooke. It consisted of a red and black cross on yellow shield, crested by a badger, known in heraldic parlance as a "brock" and hence alluding to the dynastic surname. A crown was added in 1848, and the shield design was used as the basis of the Sarawak flag until 1973. In 1988 the state flag reverted to these original colours. Years in use 1841–1946

Coat of arms of the Crown Colony and the State of Sarawak
Description The arms of the British Crown Colony of Sarawak were based on the arms of the Raj. Also used as the state coat of arms when Sarawak formed Malaysia with Malaya, Sabah and Singapore in 1963. Years in use 1947–1973 Escutcheon Or, on a cross parted per pale Sable and Gules, an Eastern crown of the field.

Coat of arms of the State of Sarawak
Description The design of the arms of the state of Sarawak from 1973–1988 serves as the basis for the current state coat of arms and was the first to feature a rhinoceros hornbill as the state emblem. Most of the elements of the emblem are similar to the current version, except for the then state flag – the "Trisakti" on the shield and the then state motto Hidup Selalu Berkhidmat. Years in use 1973–1988 Escutcheon Tierced per pall, azure, argent and gules. Supporters A rhinoceros hornbill proper displayed, clutching a scroll of state motto. Motto Sarawak on the smaller scroll, Hidup Selalu Berkhidmat (Malay for 'Live to serve') on the larger scroll. Other elements Two mirrored branches of Bunga Raya (Hibiscus flower) proper.

== Yang di-Pertua Negeri arms ==
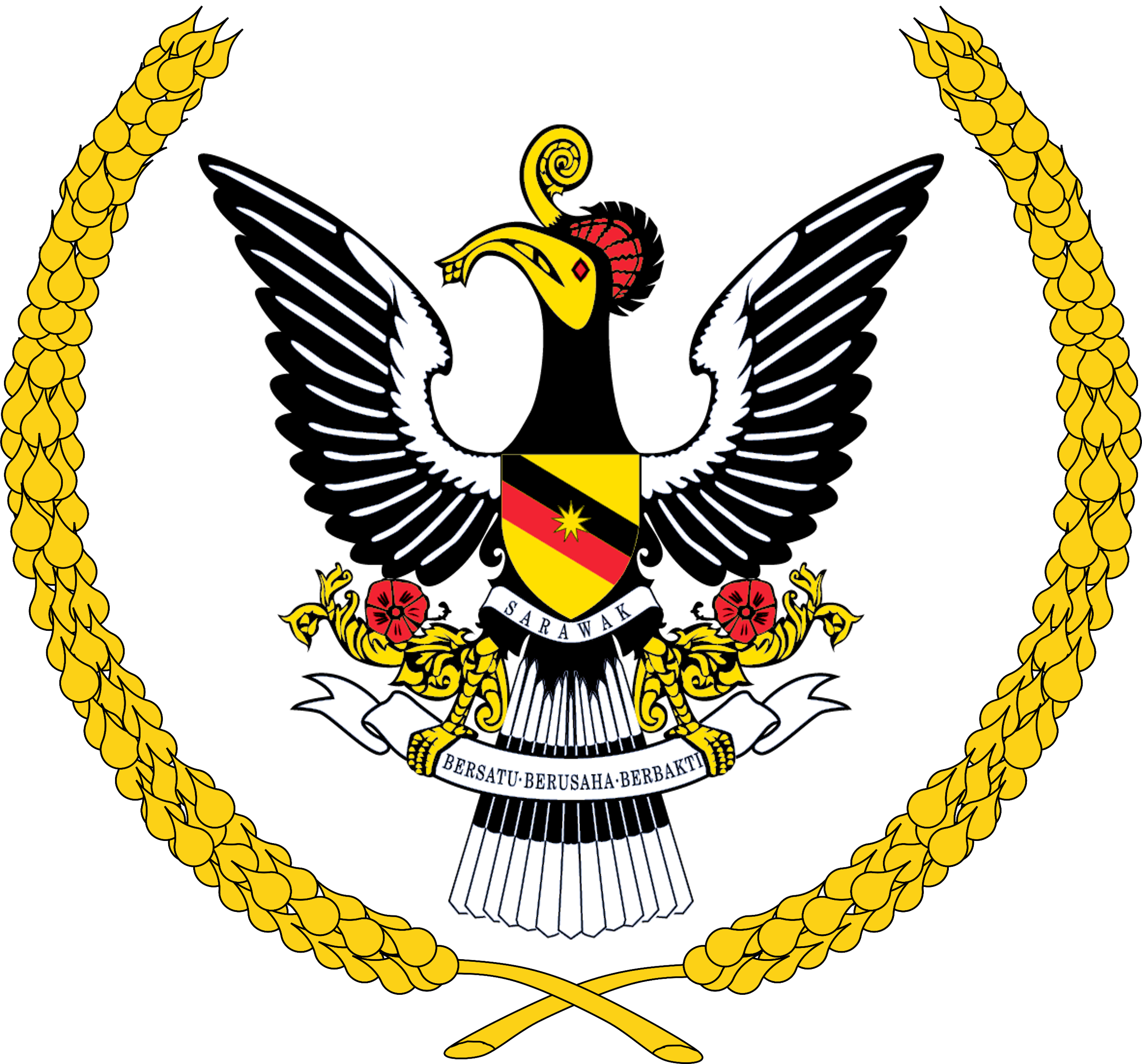
The arms of the Yang di-Pertua Negeri of Sarawak consists of the state arms surrounded by two wreaths of rice.

== City, district and municipal council emblems ==
Emblem of Kuching North City Hall

Emblem of Kuching South City Council

Emblem of Miri City Council

Emblem of Bintulu Development Authority

Emblem of Kota Samarahan Municipal Council

Emblem of Padawan Municipal Council

Emblem of Sibu Municipal Council

Emblem of Sibu Rural District Area

== See also ==
- Flag of Sarawak
- Armorial of Malaysia
