= Malaysian literature =

Malaysian literature consists of literature produced in the Malay Peninsula until 1963 and in Malaysia thereafter. Malaysian literature is typically written in any of the country's four main languages: Malay, English, Chinese and Tamil. It portrays various aspects of Malaysian life and comprises an important part of the culture of Malaysia.

The earliest works of Malaysian literature were transmitted orally in the absence of writing scripts. Oral literature encompasses a variety of genres of Malay folklore, such as myths, legends, folk tales, romances, epics, poetry, proverbs, origin stories and oral histories. Oral tradition thrived among the Malays, but continues to survive among the indigenous people of Malaysia, including the Orang Asli and numerous ethnic groups in Sarawak and Sabah.

== Oral traditions ==
Early Malay literature was mainly influenced by Indian epics, such as the Mahabharata and the Ramayana, which later included other traditions that now form the Malay literary heritage prose which were delivered through generations by oral tradition. These include the Hikayat Seri Rama, Hikayat Mara Karma, Hikayat Panca Tanderan and Hikayat Gul Bakawali. Much of the stories were compiled and published into books by Dewan Bahasa dan Pustaka, the national language society. Malay romantic tales were also sourced from the Panji cycle of Hindu Java.

The hikayat is a form of Malay literature that writes concerning the adventures of heroes and legends from the pre-modern time period within the Malay Archipelago (spanning modern Indonesia and Malaysia, especially in Sumatra), it may also chronicle royalties and events surrounding them. The stories they contain, though based on history, are heavily romanticized.

For the Orang Asli, literature was and still is constituted by accounts of actual events. Different ethnic groups have different versions of the same story, although there are several recurring themes and elements in every tale.

The cultural practices of the indigenous people in Sarawak are shaped in part by oral traditions. Themes like the relationship of the people to their past, particularly their ancestry, and the spirit world, including its influence on the production of food and health are the primary themes of the oral literature of various ethnic groups in Sarawak. The recitation of oral literature is often accompanied by rituals. While the oral traditions of Sabah encompass folk tales and legends, such as creation myths, that have been preserved by the ethnic groups in the state. This oral literature is recited during ceremonies conducted by priestesses, who serve as ritual specialists, faith healers and spirit mediums.

== Written format ==
=== Early modern epics and chronicles ===
The literary traditions of the Malay sultanates throughout the 16th to early 19th centuries were distinct in that scribes were hired to record the significant events of the time. One important work of this period was the Sejarah Melayu (The Malay Annals), which was written during the era of the Malacca Sultanate, rewritten in 1536 and revised in 1612. Others include Hikayat Merong Mahawangsa, Hikayat Amir Hamzah, Hikayat Patani or the Tuhfat al-Nafis. Though chronicles of these types did not reach a mass audience and instead were confined to an elite few.

=== Modern period ===
By the late 19th century, oral storytelling on the Malay Peninsula had been superseded by literature. This was attributed largely in part to the gradual introduction of Islam to the peninsula and the adoption of the Jawi script. Mixed with the early 20th century fervor of nationalism by intellectuals that were educated in Turkey or in Al-Azhar University in Egypt produced a new generation of writers. Works during this time ranged from theological literature that discussed religion as the crucial solution towards social problems as well as colonialism such as Melati Kota Bharu by Abdul Kadir Adabi (1901–1944); romances were made such as Nasib Hasnah by Abdullah Sidek (1913–1973) which discusses the principles of romance and long-lasting relationship between husband and wife; stories with moral anecdotes are commonly seen in short stories throughout 1920s and the 1930s; while popular tales of Islamic prophets and even tales surrounding animals were written in a number of styles ranging from religious to the Hikayat form.

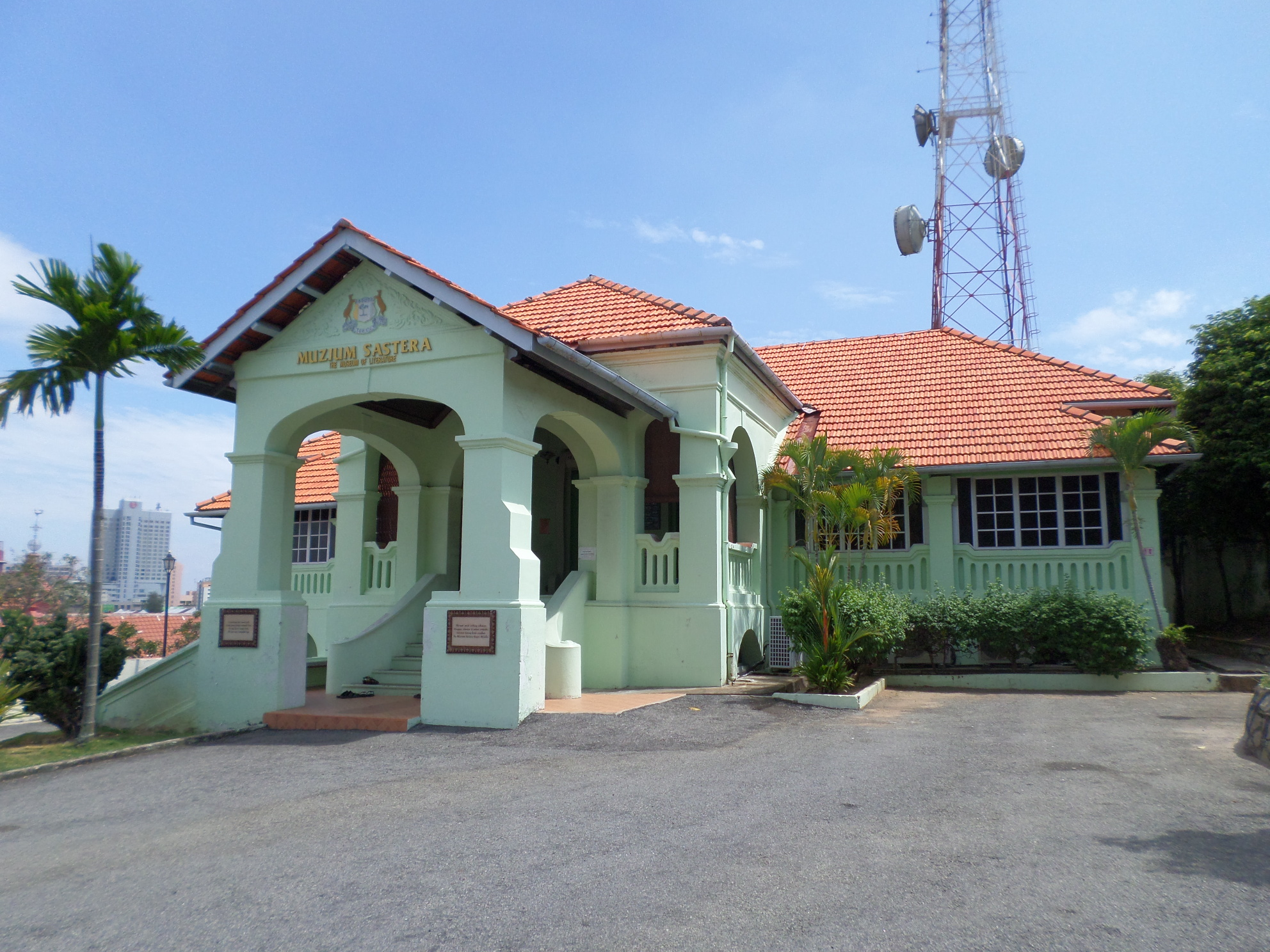
Malacca Literature Museum

A surge of new, modern writers gave birth to what is considered as a novelty then, in the form of a novel or short story. Through colonialism, increasing numbers of intellectuals mainly educated in MPSI (Maktab Perguruan Sultan Idris) or MCKK (Malay College Kuala Kangsar) had such a profound impact throughout the development of the two forms of literature. First developed by Munshi Abdullah (1796–1854) in his Hikayat Pelayaran, it later developed by the end of the 1920s and throughout the 1930s. Much of the works were didactic in every sense, implementing elements of religion and theology, and a critique of the social problems that surfaced which deemed to halt such progress of economic prosperity and independence. Their novels were often melancholic and portrayed the Malay working class in an idealistic manner, much driven with realism and romanticism. Writers during this period include Abdul Rahim Kajai (1894–1943), Harun Aminurrashid (1907–1986) and to a lesser extent, Abdullah Sidek.

During the Japanese occupation, literature were mainly driven with such fervor by the Emperor of Japan and were published in magazines (such as Fajar Asia). Most of the works centered on the strength of the Japanese Army and their successes as well as Japanese-induced nationalistic fervor. Few novels, short stories and poetry were written during this period, only a few remained from the 1930s such as those by Ishak Haji Muhammad and Abdul Rahim Kajai.

A new generation of post-independence writers started exploring themes of the complexities of human relationships amid changing times, such as A. Samad Said (born 1935) in his novel Salina (1961). Known for his poetry and plays, Usman Awang (1929–2001) was a central figure in Malaysian literature, his works often addressed themes of social justice, human dignity, and rural life, reflecting his commitment to the struggles and aspirations of the common people.

== Poetry ==
Traditional Malay poetry was used for entertainment and the recording of history and laws. Several forms of Malay poetry, which are either in the form of pantun (poems that rhymed with each other and are didactic in its every sense), syair (a long narrative poem, that is made up of four stanzas and recited with a tone akin to singing), gurindam and seloka and still remain popular today. Modern Malay poetry consists of the sajak.

== See also ==
- List of libraries in Malaysia
- Malaysian National Laureate
- May 13: Declassified Documents on the Malaysian Riots of 1969
- Terengganu Inscription Stone

== Sources ==
- Adopted from Selected Poems and Short Stories Form 1 textbook
- Adopted from Selected Poems and Short Stories Form 4 textbook
- Adopted from Antologi Tingkatan 1 textbook
- Adopted from Antologi Tingkatan 2 textbook
- Adopted from Antologi Tingkatan 3 textbook
- Adopted from Antologi Tingkatan 4 textbook
- Adopted from Antologi Tingkatan 5 textbook
- Quayum, Mohammad A., (2001) Malaysian Literature in English: A Critical Reader. Kuala Lumpur: Pearson Education, ISBN 983-74-1956-3.
