= Kosmo! =

Malaysian newspaper

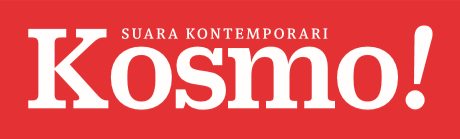

- Front page on 27 April 2021
- Type: Daily newspaper
- Format: Compact
- Owners: The Utusan Group (2004–2019); Media Mulia Sdn Bhd (2020–present)
- Publisher: Mohamad Azlan Jaafar
- Editor: Wan Hasnan Wan Hasan
- Deputy editor: Jamdi Nasir
- News editor: Megat Ramli Megat Raof Mustapa Lakawa; Turmadzi Madun; Atikah Dali; Suhana Md Yusop; Siti Kamilah Mustapha Muhammad Firdaus Hassan
- Founded: August 30, 2004; 22 years ago
- Language: Malay
- Headquarters: Level 4 (East) & 5, Quattro West No. 4 Lorong Persiaran Barat 46200 Petaling Jaya, Selangor, Malaysia
- Circulation: 187,967 (daily); 205,520 (Kosmo Ahad); *Source: Audit Bureau of Circulations, Malaysia; July – December 2015
- Website: www.kosmo.com.my
- Free online archives: www.kosmo.com.my

Kosmo! (short for Cosmopolitan; Malay: Kosmopolitan) is a Malay-language compact format newspaper tabloid in Malaysia owned by the Utusan Group, which also owns Kosmo!'s Sunday paper Kosmo! Ahad, Utusan Malaysia, and Mingguan Malaysia. It is available in Malaysia at most newsstands.

== History ==
Kosmo! was launched on 30 August 2004 by Prime Minister Dato’ Seri Abdullah Ahmad Badawi. All the sections in this newspaper use an exclamation mark (!). Unlike its rival newspaper, Harian Metro, whose readership and daily circulations increased over the years, Kosmo! has a much lower readership and decreased daily circulations.

Formerly, Kosmo! was sold in Malaysia at a price of 80 cents daily excluding Sundays, when it was sold at RM 1.00 under a different name, that is Kosmo! Ahad. However, by April 2007, Kosmo! priced at RM1.00 per day, while on Sundays it is sold at RM1.20. As of July 2016, it is priced at RM1.00 for both Kosmo! and Kosmo Ahad.

Despite initial reports in mid-August 2019 that the Utusan Group would be shutting down its newspaper operations including Kosmo!, Utusan Malaysia, and their respective Sunday edition, the company retracted its decision after receiving a RM1.6 million cash injection from the United Malays National Organisation. However, the Utusan Group announced that they will be raising Kosmo! Ahad's price from RM1.00 to RM1.50 and shifting to a new business model.

Despite attempts to salvage Kosmo! and its sister newspapers, the Utusan Group executive chairman Datuk Abd Aziz Sheikh Fadzir announced that the company's newspapers would cease publication on 10 October 2019 due to poor cash flow, mounting debts and declining sales. Staff were given a few hours to clear their belongings from the Utusan Group headquarters. The four Utusan newspapers are expected to resume publication on 1 November 2019 under a new management. Aurora Mulia, a company linked to business tycoon Syed Mokhtar Al-Bukhary which also hold a stake in Media Prima, had reportedly acquired 70 percent of Utusan's wholly owned subsidiary Dilof Sdn Bhd. However, only some of the 862 redundant employees would be rehired.

In January 2020, it was reported that Kosmo!, along with its sister newspaper, Utusan Malaysia is set to be revived soon, as some sources in the industry confirming that newspaper's new management has recruiting staff to start working in February.

Kosmo!, together with Utusan is expected to be relaunched in July 2020. According to their website, an animated teaser, which written in Malay showed: "Nantikan Julai ini. Dibawakan oleh Media Mulia Sdn Bhd." ("Awaiting this July. Brought to you by Media Mulia Sdn Bhd,"). It is understood that the new headquarters of the publication will be based at the New Straits Times Press main office at Jalan Riong, Bangsar. On 6 July, the newspaper's relaunch is expected to take place on 20 July.

== See also ==
- Other Malay-language newspapers in Malaysia:
  - Berita Harian
  - Harian Metro
  - Utusan Malaysia
  - Utusan Borneo, a newspaper publication for the state of Sabah and Sarawak
  - Sinar Harian
