= A. Samad Said =

Malaysian novelist and poet (born 1935)

Yang Berbahagia Sasterawan Negara Dato' Seri A. Samad Said DGPN DMSM Malaysian National Laureate
- عبدالصمد بن محمد سعيد
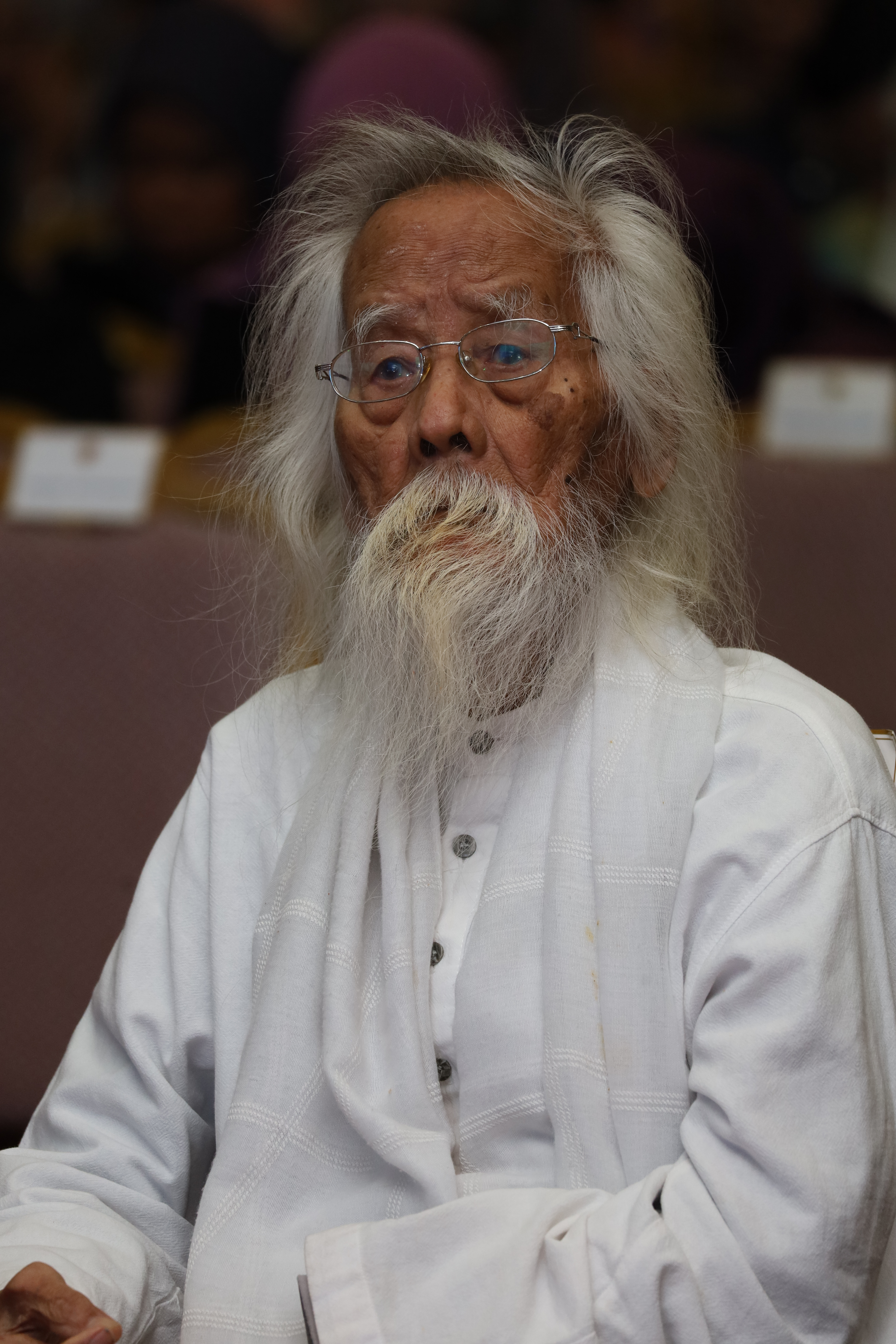
- A. Samad Said in 2025
- Born: Abdul Samad bin Mohamed Said; 9 April 1935 (age 91); Durian Tunggal, Malacca, Straits Settlement, British Malaya (now Malaysia)
- Education: Victoria School, Singapore
- Occupation: writer
- Spouse: Salmi Manja
- Writing career
- Language: Malay, English
- Genres: Novelist, poet
- Notable awards: Pejuang Sastera (1976); S.E.A. Write Award (1979); Sasterawan Negara (1985); Sasterawan Nusantara (1999)

Abdul Samad bin Mohamed Said (born 9 April 1935) is a Malaysian novelist and poet. In May 1976, he was named by Malaysia literature communities and many of the country's linguists as the Pejuang Sastera [Literary Exponent] receiving, within the following decade, the 1979 Southeast Asia Write Award and, in 1986, in appreciation of his continuous writings and contributions to the nation's literary heritage, or Kesusasteraan Melayu, the title Sasterawan Negara or Malaysian National Laureate. He was the recipient for the 2024 Merdeka Award for his contributions to Malay literature.

== Education ==
A native of the Malaccan Kampung village of Belimbing Dalam, near the town of Durian Tunggal, young Abdul Samad completed his primary education during the World War II years of 1940–46 at Singapore's Sekolah Melayu Kota Raja (Kota Raja Malay School). During the wartime occupation of Malaya and Singapore by the Japanese Empire, he attended the occupying authorities' Sekolah Jepun school for a brief three-month period. Upon the war's conclusion, he furthered his studies at Singapore's Victoria School, graduating in 1956 with Senior Cambridge Certificate. Although starting as a clerk in a hospital, he was soon able to achieve his ambition of becoming a full-time writer in Utusan Melayu, Warta Tebrau and Berita Harian, authoring numerous poems and short stories in the years to come.

== Achievements ==
1. Pejuang Sastera (1976)
2. SEA Write Award (1979)
3. Sasterawan Negara (1985)
4. Sasterawan Nusantara (1999)

His poem, "The Dead Crow" was translated into English language and was included in the Malaysian lower secondary school English literature curriculum from 2000 to 2009. A survey was done among 360 students and it was found that 10 (2.8%) of the students described the poem as "hardest to understand" of all the poems taught in secondary school.

== Works ==
A.Samad Said wrote in almost all field of literature and creative writing. Two of his notable works are Salina, about a prostitute in Malay pre Independence and Hujan Pagi (translated to English as Morning Post), considered as Malaysia's first magical realism novel. He wrote novel, short stories, poem, essay, drama and article. Among his anthologies are Suara Dari Dinding Dewan (2003) and Dirgahayu Dr. Mahathir & Rindu Ibu (2004). His most recent anthology of essays is Ilham Di Tepi Tasik (2006). A. Samad Said is also known as Hilmy, Isa Dahmuri, Jamil Kelana, Manja, Mesra and Shamsir.

- Salina. Kuala Lumpur: Dewan Bahasa dan Pustaka, 1961. OCLC 3220023 / Revised edition, 1976. OCLC 851140838. This version uses the New Rumi Spelling. / Second edition, 1989. ISBN 9836203680; OCLC 1223479218.
  - Shōfu Salina (娼婦サリナ). Translated by Tatsuo Hoshino. Tokyo : Imura bunka zigyousya, 1983. OCLC 963154279. Japanese version of Salina.
  - Sallinauiyeonindeul (살리나의연인들). Translated by Jong Yeong-nim. Seoul: Chihaksa, 1987. OCLC 19842949. Korean version of Salina.
  - Salina. Translated by Hawa Abdullah. Kuala Lumpur: Dewan Bahasa dan Pustaka, Ministry of Education Malaysia, 1991. OCLC 1110424624. / Translated by Lalita Sinha. Kuala Lumpur: Institut Terjemahan & Buku Malaysia, Attin Press, 2013. ISBN 9789674302566; OCLC 862575621. English versions of Salina.
  - Shā lì nà (莎丽娜). Translated by Yu Yu. Taiyuan: Beiyue Literature and Art Publishing House, 1992. ISBN 7537805326; OCLC 299479243. Chinese version of Salina.
  - Salina. Translated by Laurent Metzger. Paris: L'Harmattan, 1997. ISBN 2738448372; OCLC 37574979. French version of Salina.
  - Salina. Translated by Rosa Maria Glavan Martinez. Kuala Lumpur: Institut Terjemahan & Buku Malaysia, 2014. ISBN 9789674303686; OCLC 973217422. Spanish version of Salina.
- Bulan Tak Bermadu di Fatehpur Sikri. Malacca: Toko Buku Abbas Bandong, 1966. OCLC 30025401. This version uses Za'aba Spelling and released as Bulan Ta' Bermadu di-Fatehpur Sikri / Revised edition, Subang Jaya, Selangor: Tra-Tra, 1982. OCLC 9852583.
- Sungai Mengalir Lesu. Kuala Lumpur: Pustaka Gunong Tahan, 1967. OCLC 41075388. / Kuala Lumpur: Dewan Bahasa dan Pustaka, 1988. ISBN 9836205535; OCLC 851106765. This version is written in Jawi script.
  - Lazy river Translated by Harry Aveling. Kuala Lumpur: Heinemann Asia, 1981. OCLC 9240656. English version of Sungai Mengalir Lesu.
  - Yōuyōu héshuǐ (悠悠河水). Translated by Lee Ngeok Lan. Kuala Lumpur: Institut Terjemahan & Buku Malaysia, 2014. ISBN 978-967-430-571-0; OCLC 973218046. Chinese version of Sungai Mengalir Lesu.
- Benih Harapan. Kuala Lumpur: Grafika Sendirian Berhad, 1973. OCLC 63842871. A poem collection.
- Di Hadapan Pulau. Kuala Lumpur: Dewan Bahasa dan Pustaka, 1978. ISBN 9789836208873; OCLC 963070129.
- Langit Petang. Kuala Lumpur: Dewan Bahasa dan Pustaka, 1980. OCLC 656155371.
- Daerah Zeni. Petaling Jaya: Fajar Bakti, 1985. ISBN 9789679333015; OCLC 18234602.
- Benih Semalu
- Daun Semalu Pucuk Paku
- Warkah Eropah
- Al-Amin
- Suara Dari Dinding Dewan
- Hujan Pagi
- Lantai T Pinkie
- Wira Bukit
- Adik Datang
- Cinta Fansuri

== Activism and political views ==
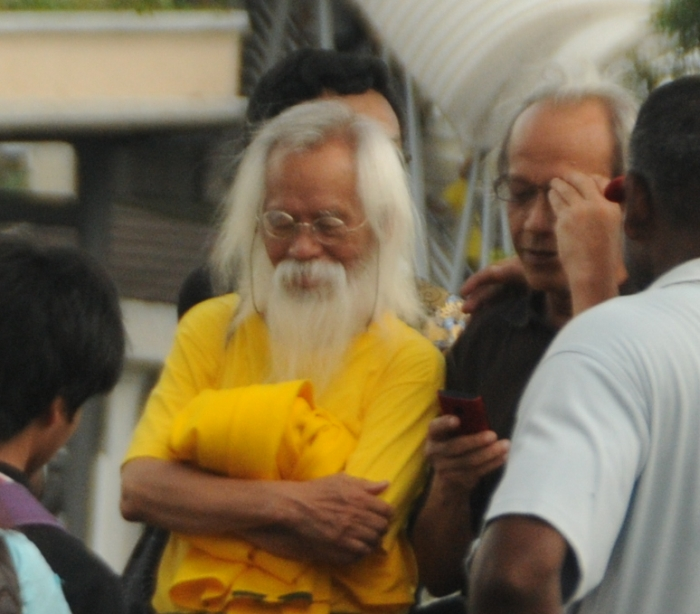
A. Samad Said during Bersih 3.0 rally.

In 2009, A. Samad Said together with four other literary scholars, campaigned to abolish PPSMI (Teaching of Mathematics and Science in English) in Malaysian secondary schools. He believed that such opposition is needed to prevent the degradation of Malay language usage in Malaysia. He also participated in an anti-PPSMI rally near the Malaysia Royal Palace in order to hand over a memorandum to the palace.

He became the co-chairperson for Bersih 2.0 rally together with Ambiga Sreenevasan in 2011 in order to support a free and fair elections in Malaysia. He also composed a poem named "Unggun Bersih" (Cleansing fire) where the poem became a subject of police investigation for sedition. Disappointed with the lack of electoral reform, he openly supported for Bersih 3.0 rally in the following year. During this rally, he composed another two poems which expressed his disappointment when he was not allowed to go to National Mosque of Malaysia to conduct his prayers and describing a clash between the Bersih 3.0 supporters and authorities guarding the Merdeka Square, Kuala Lumpur. During the 2013 Malaysian general elections, he openly supported Pakatan Rakyat (PR) coalition in order to end the Barisan Nasional (BN) rule in Malaysia, believing that PR can deliver on fixing the problems in Malaysian healthcare, education, and democracy systems. He also criticised BN for using racist, vote-buying, and scare-tactics during the election. In Samad Said's opinion, Chin Peng was not a communist terrorist as depicted by Malaysian government but should be regarded as a freedom fighter and be allowed back to Malaysia from exile in Thailand. This is because Chin Peng had fought against the Japanese and British colonial masters before the independence of Malaya. On 13 June 2015, Samad Said joined Democratic Action Party (DAP). He described the party as a "truly Malaysian party, which is clean, focused, with a genuine Malaysian dream".

== Personal life ==
A Samad Said's wife, Salmi Manja died on 26 December 2023, at the age of 86.

== Honours ==
=== Honours of Malaysia ===
- Penang
  - Commander of the Order of the Defender of State (DGPN) – Dato' Seri (2017)
- Melaka
  - Companion Class I of the Exalted Order of Malacca (DMSM) – Datuk (1996)

== See also ==
- Mass media in Malaysia
- Abdul Rahim Kajai
- Abdul Samad Ismail
- Aziz Ishak
- Ishak Haji Muhammad
- Said Zahari
- Usman Awang
- Yusof Ishak
