= Keris Mas =

- Born: Kamaluddin bin Muhamad; 10 June 1922; Kampung Ketari, Bentong, Pahang
- Died: 9 March 1992 (aged 69); Kuala Lumpur Hospital
- Resting place: Bukit Kiara Muslim Cemetery, Kuala Lumpur
- Occupations: Journalist; Editor; Literary administrator Write; Critic
- Years active: 1981–1992
- Spouse: Roswita Ali
- Children: 2

Keris Mas (10 June 1922 – 9 March 1992), born Kamaluddin Muhamad, was a prominent Malaysian literary figure and was one of the founders of the Asas '50 literary movement. His numerous contributions to Malay language literature (especially in the short story form) led him to become Malaysia's first National Laureate in 1981.

== Biography ==
Born in Kampung Ketari, Bentong, Pahang. Keris Mas received his early education at the Malay School in his village, before going to the Tawalib school in Sumatra, and the Muallimin Al-Islamiah College.

After World War II, he joined the Parti Kebangsaan Melayu Malaya (The National Malay Party of Malaya) (PKMM) wing in Pahang, and was actively involved in its branch in Singapore. In the party, he held the Information Officer post.

He also worked with several newspapers, such as the Melayu Raya, Warta Negara (until 1956), and Utusan Melayu in Singapore (as the Editor of Publication). He is credited with contributing a lot towards the development of Mastika magazine and Utusan Zaman, a Malay-language newspaper in Jawi script.

He joined the Dewan Bahasa dan Pustaka in December 1956 as an editor, and his highest post, before his retirement on 10 June 1977, was as the head of the literary development section. After his retirement, he continued to be a Penulis Tamu (Resident Writer) at the University of Malaya and Dewan Bahasa dan Pustaka.

== Literary career ==
Keris Mas main contribution in the field of local literature was in short stories. By the end of the 1960s, he had written about 60 short stories. His first short story was Wasiat Orang Bangsawan (The Last Will and Testament of a Nobleman), published in the magazine Suluh Malaya (The Malayan Torch) in 1946. His works are now contained in the following anthologies: Mekar dan Segar (Rise and Shine) (1959), Dua Zaman (Two Eras) (1963), Patah Tumbuh (What Is Lost Returns) (1963); and Pertentangan (Conflict) (1968).

He is also the author of four novels: Pahlawan Rimba Malaya (Hero of the Malayan Jungle) (1946); Korban Kesuciannya (His Holy Sacrifice) (1949); Anak Titiwangsa (The Son of Titiwangsa) (1949); Saudagar Besar dari Kuala Lumpur (The Big-Time Merchant From Kuala Lumpur) (1983),and Rimba Harapan (The Jungle of Hope) (1983).

His works are distinguished by their themes of addressing social injustice and strong and lively characters that resonate with the reader.

=== Asas 50 ===
Asas 50 (Angkatan Sasterawan 50) (Writers movement '50) came into existence on 6 August 1950. Keris Mas was one of the 19 founding members (comprising teachers and journalists) of the movement, which includes Usman Awang, Abdul Samad Ismail, Masuri SN and others.

With the motto Seni Untuk Masyarakat (The Arts for the People), it was inspired by the Indonesian writers movement, Angkatan 45, and has been described as a watershed moment for the development of Malay literature in the region. Seen as an angry young men movement, it championed several aims:

- To free Malay society from those elements of its culture which was obstructing or negating the pursuit of modernity and progress;
- To advance the intellectual awareness of the rakyat (Malay masses) towards the ideals of social justice, prosperity, peace and harmony;
- To foster Malay nationalism; and
- To refine and promote the Malay language as the lingua franca of Malaya.

To that end, members employed a realist style in their writing, deliberately going against established genres that they felt were too preoccupied with stylistics and the trivial aspects of human life, thus not reflecting the reality of human life.

Keris Mas himself described the movement as follows:

"In the field of literature, the proponents of ASAS 50 adopted a new breathe [sic?] of style, employing a mode of language that is fresh, departing from the preceding genre of writers, propounding the themes of societal awareness, politics and culture with the aim of revitalising the spirit of freedom, the spirit of independence of a people (bangsa) of its own unique sense of honour and identity, upholding justice and combating oppression.

.... We criticised societal backwardness and those whom we regard as the instruments responsible for the birth of such backwardness. We criticised colonialism and its instruments, that is, the elite class, those whose consciousness have been frozen by the influence of feudalism and myths, and superstition that has been enmeshed with religion."

It is still a registered body until today. Its motto however has since developed to "Seni Bina Manusia" or "Literature develops humanity" but the primary philosophy has upheld. ASAS 50 has also since developed its youth wing to develop and nurture budding talents. Today, its youth wing is led by highly motivated individuals each developing their own identity, approach, and style towards the Malay literature, language and culture.

== Awards ==
In 1981, he became the first recipient of the Sasterawan Negara award.

In 1989, he was also conferred an honorary doctorate in literature by Universiti Sains Malaysia (The Science University of Malaysia).

== Death ==
Keris Mas died on 9 March 1992 from a heart attack at the Kuala Lumpur General Hospital, at 3am. At the time of his death, he was survived by his wife, Roswita Ali and two children, Hayati and Amir, and seven grandchildren. He was buried at the Bukit Kiara Muslim Cemetery, Kuala Lumpur.

== Legacy ==
Several places and honours were named after him, including:

- Kolej Keris Mas, a residential college at Universiti Kebangsaan Malaysia, Bangi, Selangor
- Taman Keris Mas, Sungai Udang, Melaka
