= Aziz Ishak =

Malaysian politician (1915–1999)

Abdul Aziz Ishak
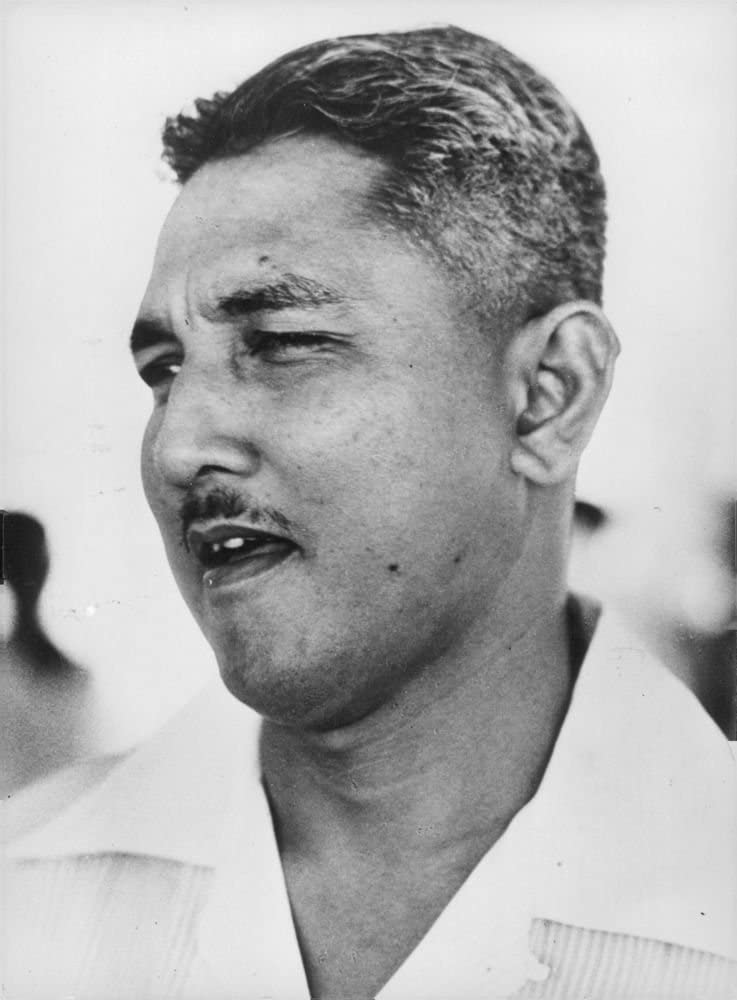
- Aziz, c. 1955.

Minister of Agriculture and Co-operatives
- In office 9 August 1955 – 2 October 1962
- Prime Minister: Tunku Abdul Rahman
- Preceded by: Omar Ong Yoke Lin
- Succeeded by: Lim Swee Aun

President of Parti Perhimpunan Kebangsaan
- In office 29 August 1963 – 13 February 1965
- Preceded by: Position established
- Succeeded by: Position abolished
Parliamentary offices
Member of the Malaysian Parliament for Kuala Langat
In office 11 September 1959 – 1 March 1964
Preceded by	Constituency established
Succeeded by	Mohd Tahir Abdul Majid
Member of Parliament for Selangor Barat
In office 27 July 1955 – 19 August 1959
Preceded by	Constituency established
Succeeded by	Constituency abolished

Personal details
- Born: 7 October 1915 Terong, Perak, Federated Malay States
- Died: 23 June 1999 (aged 83) Ampang, Kuala Lumpur, Malaysia
- Party: NCP (1963–1965)
- Other political affiliations: KMM (until 1946); PKMM (1946–1950); IMP (1951–1952); UMNO (1950–1951; 1953–1963); PAS (1987 –1999)
- Relations: Yusof Ishak (brother); Abdul Rahim Ishak (brother)
- Parent: Ishak Ahmad (father)
- Education: Victoria School; Raffles Institution

Abdul Aziz bin Ishak (1915–1999) was a Malaysian politician, activist and journalist. He was the only member of the Kesatuan Melayu Muda (KMM) to have served in the 1955 and post-Merdeka Cabinets under Tunku Abdul Rahman.

Between 1955 and 1962, he was the Minister for Agriculture and Co-operatives, where his efforts in rural development to improve the lives of rice farmers and fishermen were important although less known compared to similar efforts undertaken by the Rural Development Ministry.

Aziz's brother Yusof Ishak was the founder of Utusan Melayu and the first President of Singapore after its separation from Malaysia in 1965.

== Early life ==
Born in 1915 the state of Perak, which was then part of the Federated Malay States, Aziz Ishak is the descendant of prominent Sumatran Malay Datuk Jannatun who migrated to Penang in 1759 or 15 years before Francis Light arrived on the island.

Aziz is of Minangkabau descent from his father's side while his mother is a native of Langkat regency in North Sumatra province of Indonesia. His brother, Yusof Ishak was the first President of Singapore and his face adorns the current paper currency of Singapore that is in circulation since 1999. Another brother was Abdul Rahim Ishak, who served as Singapore's Education and Foreign Affairs Minister before assuming a number of ambassadorial positions.

Denied entry into the Malay College Kuala Kangsar because of his non-aristocratic background, Aziz attended Victoria Bridge School (now Victoria School) and Raffles Institution in Singapore.

His time at Raffles was an important learning experience. He mixed well with students of various ethnic backgrounds and was the School Captain for two years, perhaps the only Malay to have held this distinction.

At Raffles, he formed a Malay literary association with friends including Hamid Jumaat, Tun Sardon Jubir and Ahmad Ibrahim and contributed articles on the Malays and their plight to Warta Malaya, a leading Malay newspaper in Singapore. This was done through his brother Yusof who was already working as a journalist.

== Career ==
=== Colonial officer ===
Upon completing his Senior Cambridge, Aziz joined the colonial service in the Fisheries Department-based initially in Port Dickson in 1936, followed by Kuantan and then Batu Kurau where he was responsible for the northern region.

In Kuantan, his sympathy for the Malay fishermen did not go down well with officials, notably the English district officer, while in Kuala Kurau his immediate boss wanted him to read books on fisheries only and not literary works.

=== Journalism ===
Frustrated with British officialdom and after being unfairly accused of collaborating with the Japanese by his European boss (who was humiliated by the Japanese during 1942–45 and imprisoned in Changi), Aziz left the colonial service to join his brother Yusof Ishak after he founded Utusan Melayu.

It was through journalism that Aziz became widely known in Malaya. He wrote feature articles on UMNO, on the state and federal administrations and occasionally editorials.

Aziz was a member of the KMM while he was a fisheries officer in Kuala Kurau. In 1946, he and Abdul Samad Ismail formed Gerakan Angkatan Melayu Sedar (Geram), which was refused registration by the colonial authority. It was closely watched by the Special Branch. Geram was critical of the Malayan Union; it was also critical of UMNO because of the prominent role of the feudal aristocracy within the movement. Geram died a natural death when Aziz moved to Kuala Lumpur in 1948 as Utusan Melayu correspondent in the central region.

Aziz was the only journalist who was appointed a member of the Federal Legislative Council and he played an active role in its proceedings. In September 1951, he urged the government to declare an end to the Emergency.

== Political involvement ==
Aziz's political involvement was varied. Before 1942, he was a member of the KMM and after 1945 sympathised with the PKMM. However, in 1950 he joined UMNO when it was still led by Datuk Onn Jaafar although his idea of full independence for Malaya at this time was neither acceptable to Onn nor Tunku Abdul Rahman.

When the Independence of Malaya Party was formed in 1951 by Onn, Aziz became deputy chairman of the IMP's Kuala Lumpur branch and contested the 1952 elections in Sentul but lost to the Alliance candidate.

In the same year, he left the IMP due to personal differences with Onn. Upon Tunku's encouragement, he rejoined UMNO in April 1953. Aziz then held important positions within Umno and the Alliance. In 1953, he was appointed to the Alliance Round Table Conference that called for an early general election in Malaya.

In September 1954, Aziz campaigned actively with Tunku in the Terengganu election which was won by the Alliance despite open support for Parti Negara by the British.

In 1955, he was appointed head of Selangor UMNO and chairman of the Selangor Alliance. He was very much involved in drafting the 1955 Alliance manifesto for the general election held that year; the manifesto covered issues such as Malay language, agriculture, economy, education, and finance.

In the elections, he stood on the Alliance ticket and won in Selangor Barat. He faced Parti Negara candidate Mohd Rashid Ahmad, a former schoolmate. Despite official backing for Parti Negara, including from the colonial police force, the Alliance went on to win the first national elections, taking 51 of the 52 seats. Aziz himself obtained 8,713 votes, handily defeating his opponent with a 6,438 majority.

For the country's first elections after independence which were held in 1959, Aziz shifted to the Kuala Langat parliamentary seat. He secured 9,492 votes, defeating Syed Ibrahim Syed Salim of PMIP by 5,193 votes.

In 1987, during PAS muktamar (or annual grand meeting), he was registered as one of the party members.

== Cabinet position ==
Aziz was appointed Minister of Agriculture and co-operatives, a post he kept until 1963. Tun Abdul Razak took note of Aziz's useful work among the rural folk, especially the setting up of co-operatives to eliminate the exploitation by middlemen.

The year 1955 saw a growing rift between Aziz with his Cabinet colleagues, notably the Tunku and Abdul Razak who was overall in charge of rural development. Aziz's blunt criticisms of ministers, such as the wearing of uniforms, did not endear him well with the Tunku. He was also unhappy at the Alliance's neglect of the 1955 manifesto due to the exuberant push for political independence.

In his memoirs, Aziz claimed that the 1955 Cabinet was beset with policy differences on various issues, including the replacement of expatriate British officers with Malayans or Malayanisation. Aziz was equally passionate on press freedom that he claimed had been eroded after 1955.

Aziz resigned from the Cabinet in 1963 after he was transferred to the Health Ministry. This was due to irreconcilable differences with the Tunku and other Cabinet colleagues on strategies for rural development. There was no place for a socialist in a Cabinet that was pursuing capitalistic policies and firmly committed to upholding a free-market economy. On 13 February 1963, he was expelled from UMNO.

Aziz eventually went on to form the short lived National Convention Party that joined the left wing Malayan Peoples' Socialist Front together with the Labour Party of Malaya and Partai Ra'ayat to contest the 1964 general elections.

This was not a successful move as he was defeated in the 1964 elections. He attempted to defend his Kuala Langat parliamentary seat under the Socialist Front banner but lost by 3,797 votes to his former party colleague Mohd Tahir Abdul Majid. The NCP and PRM both failed to win any seats in the election, and the Labour Party only won two seats.

== Post-Cabinet ==
In 1963, soon after the outbreak of the Konfrontasi between Malaysia and Indonesia, the Alliance government began yet another massive round up of politicians and activists among the opposition under the Internal Security Act. Among those arrested and detained were Ahmad Boestaman, Ishak Haji Muhammad, Abdul Aziz Ishak (head of GERAM), Datuk Kampo Radjo (later the president of PRM), Tan Kai Hee, Tan Hock Hin, Dr. Rajakumar, Hasnul Hadi, Tajuddin Kahar and hundreds of others.

Aziz was accused of being a traitor and collaborating with Indonesian agents to form a government-in-exile, a charge that he denied. He was detained between 1965 and 1966 under the law.

In his book Special Guest: The Detention in Malaysia of an Ex-Cabinet Minister he describes in detail the irreconcilable differences with the Tunku and the events that led to his resignation, subsequent detention and release. The book was banned and only allowed restricted access in university libraries.

His earlier biographical account Katak Keluar dari Bawah Tempurong stopped at 1955 and his subsequent appointment as minister. As a result, not much is known about Aziz Ishak and his role in the struggle for independence through the newspaper Utusan Melayu and in the political arena when he was head of Selangor UMNO and Selangor Alliance in the mid-1950s when the political bargaining among the Alliance partners were struck.

He turned down all subsequent offers of state and federal awards.

== Election results ==
Federal Legislative Council
Year	Constituency	Candidate	Votes	Pct	Opponent(s)	Votes	Pct	Ballots cast	Majority	Turnout
1955	Selangor Barat	Abdul Aziz Ishak (UMNO)	8,713	73.81%	Mohd Rashid Ahmad (NEGARA)	3,092	26.19%	12,043	5,621	86.97%

Parliament of the Federation of Malaya
Year	Constituency	Candidate	Votes	Pct	Opponent(s)	Votes	Pct	Ballots cast	Majority	Turnout
1959	P075 Kuala Langat	Abdul Aziz Ishak (UMNO)	9,492	68.83%	Syed Ibrahim Syed Salim (PAS)	4,299	31.17%	13,791	5,193	81.66%

Parliament of Malaysia
Year	Constituency	Candidate	Votes	Pct	Opponent(s)	Votes	Pct	Ballots cast	Majority	Turnout
1964	P075 Kuala Langat	Abdul Aziz Ishak (NCP)	6,043	38.05%	Mohd. Tahir Abdul Majid (UMNO)	9,840	61.95%	15,883	3,797	80.16%

Selangor State Legislative Assembly
Year	Constituency	Candidate	Votes	Pct	Opponent(s)	Votes	Pct	Ballots cast	Majority	Turnout
1964	N22 Morib	Abdul Aziz Ishak (NCP)	2,823	37.23%	Harun Idris (UMNO)	4,760	62.77%	8,205	1,937	80.61%

== See also ==
- Mass media in Malaysia
- Abdul Rahim Kajai
- A. Samad Said
- Abdul Samad Ismail
- Ishak Haji Muhammad
- Said Zahari
- Usman Awang
- Yusof Ishak
