= Harian Metro =

Malaysian daily newspaper

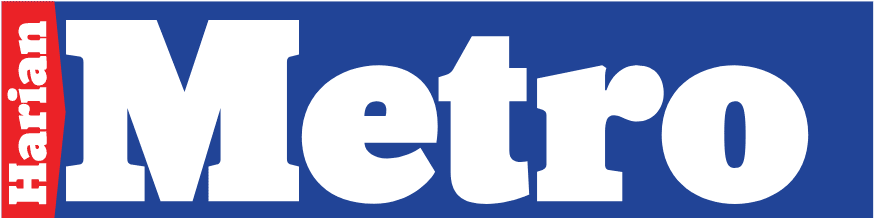

- Front page on 19 March 2018.
- Type: Daily newspaper
- Format: Tabloid
- Publisher: The New Straits Times Press (M) Berhad
- Editor: Mustapa Omar
- Deputy editor: Ahmad Salim Bachok
- Associate editor: Noorsham Md Saleh; Husain Jahit
- Managing editor: Shariffudin Mohamed; Othman Mamat
- News editor: Manan Samad; Mohd Safar Ahmad; Yusri Abdul Malek; Ahmad Shahrul Nizam Muhammad
- Photo editor: Khairil Shahriman Maarup
- Founded: 26 March 1991; 35 years ago
- Language: Malay
- Headquarters: Balai Berita 31, Jalan Riong, 59100 Bangsar, Kuala Lumpur, Malaysia
- Circulation: 179,231 (daily); 207,119 (Metro Ahad); 1,743 (daily E-paper); 1,741 (Metro Ahad E-paper); *Source: Audit Bureau of Circulations, Malaysia – July to December 2015
- Website: www.hmetro.com.my

Harian Metro is a Malaysian daily tabloid newspaper published by the New Straits Times Press, covering entertainment, lifestyle, and current affairs.

== History ==
=== 1990s ===
On 26 March 1991, Harian Metro, Malaysia's first afternoon Malay-language newspaper, was launched. The cover price at launch was RM0.50. The first news editor appointed was Mior Kamarul Shahid. Later, on 26 June 1991, the newspaper underwent its first redesign. In 1992, Ahmad Puad Onah was appointed editor. On 25 March 1992, the southern edition of Harian Metro was launched in Johor Bahru. On 1 April 1994, Zian Johari was appointed editor. In the same year, Harian Metro Edisi Timur was launched on 16 May and Edisi Utara on 1 August. On 29 August 1995, Metro Ahad, the Sunday edition of the Harian Metro, was launched.

=== 2000s ===
On 17 July 2000, Harian Metro was redesigned with a new tagline, "Kini, Sini, Terkini". On 23 July, Metro Ahad also underwent a redesign. On 26 March 2001, Harian Metro celebrated its tenth anniversary. In the fourth quarter of 2003, Metro Ahad reached 1,068,000 readers.

On 27 January 2004, official websites for Harian Metro and Metro Ahad were launched at Balai Berita in Kuala Lumpur. Later, on 1 June 2004, Berita Harian Sdn. Bhd. appointed Hafifi Hafidz as executive editor of Harian Metro and Metro Ahad, replacing Zian Johari, who became executive editor of Berita Minggu.

On 27 July 2004, Harian Metro launched a weekly column titled Liku-liku Niaga, which was published every Tuesday in the business section. On 23 August 2004, a new pullout titled "Bintang dan Variasi Metro" (V‑Met) was launched.

On 1 January 2005, the cover price of Harian Metro increased to RM1.20, while Metro Ahad rose to RM1.50. In Sabah and Sarawak, both titles were sold for RM2.00 per copy. On 6 June 2006, i‑Metro, an interactive portal for community contributions, was launched. On 15 July 2006, Harian Metro adopted a new layout with added sections on celebrities, lifestyle, health, and fashion; new nameplates were introduced, renaming "Bintang" to "Rentak Artis Popular" (RAP) and "V‑Met" to "Variasi", while Metro Ahad replaced "Meta" with "Ekspresi". On 16 July 2006, Metro Ahad was also revamped.

On 1 March 2008, Abdul Ghafar Ismail was appointed executive editor of Harian Metro and Metro Ahad. On 12 April 2009, Metro Ahad launched the "GIGS – Gema Informasi Generasi Semasa" pullout, published on Sundays. On 13 April 2009, the cover price of Harian Metro increased to RM1.50 (RM2.30 in Sabah and Sarawak); the "RAP" and "Variasi" pullouts adopted new nameplates. On 1 July 2009, Abdul Ghafar Ismail was re‑designated Deputy Group Editor; on 17 August 2009, Datuk Mustapa Omar was appointed as a Group Editor; and on 9 October 2009, Harian Metro launched the "AYU" pullout.

=== 2010s ===
On 3 May 2010, Harian Metro became available in Sabah and Sarawak. On 23 May 2010, its regional edition was officially launched in Kuching. The 64-page edition was priced at RM1.50 and covered sports, education, and community events. On 7 January 2013, the weekday entertainment pullout "Rentak Artis Popular" was shortened to "RAP". In October 2019, the weekend entertainment section "Bling" was renamed "RapXtra".

== See also ==
- Berita Harian
- Kosmo!
- Utusan Malaysia
- Utusan Borneo, a newspaper publication for the state of Sabah and Sarawak
- Sinar Harian
