= Said Zahari =

Singaporean newspaper editor (1928–2016)

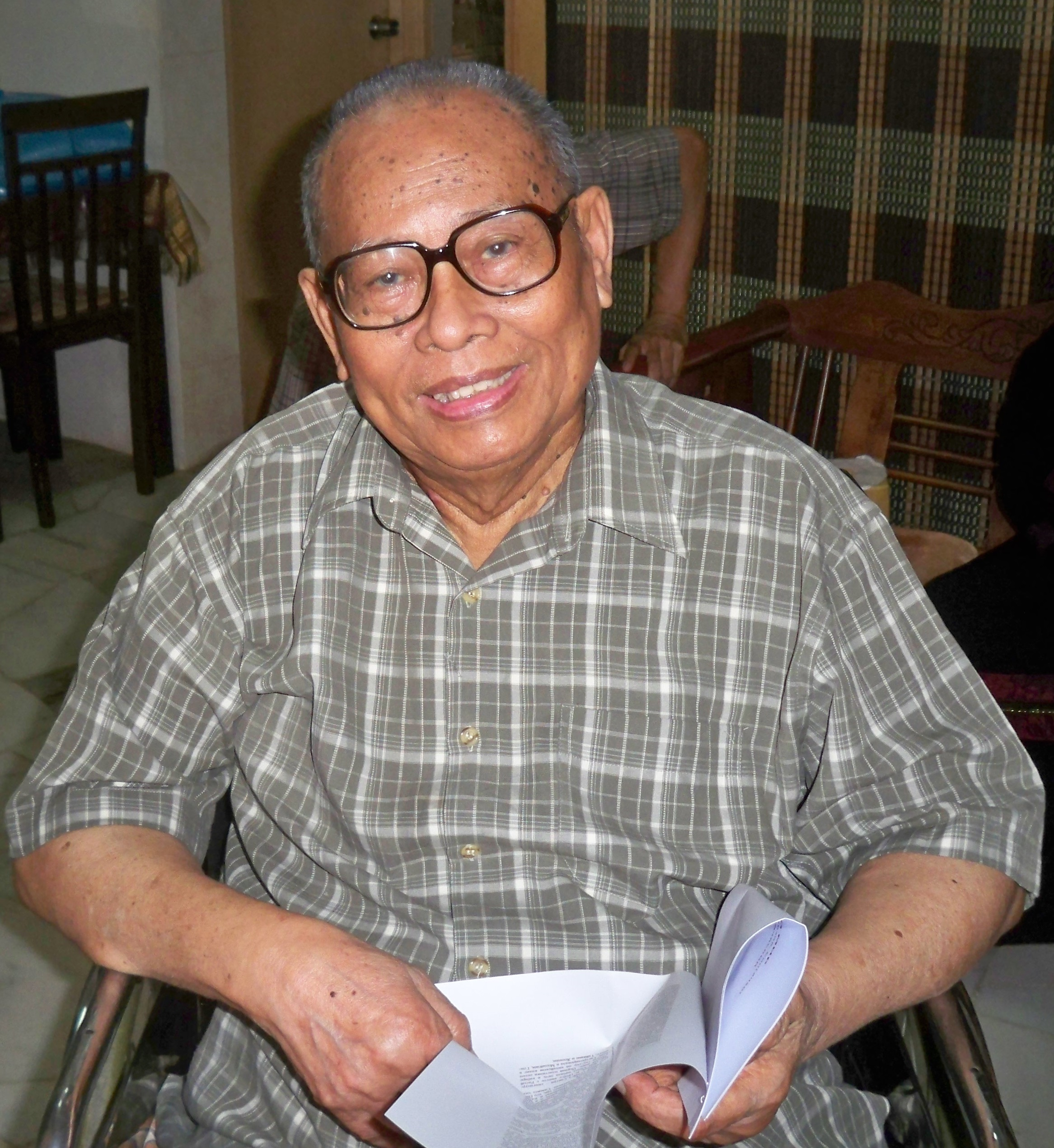
- Born: May 18, 1928; Singapore, Straits Settlement
- Died: April 12, 2016 (aged 87); Malaysia
- Other name: Pak Said
- Education: Tanglin Besar Malay School; Sultan Idris Training College; Sihan Gakko; General Certificate of Education
- Occupations: writer (former), editor-in-chief (former)
- Employers: Utusan Melayu (former); Asia Research Bulletin (former); ASEAN Business Quarterly (former)
- Known for: former prisoner of conscience of Operation Coldstore
- Notable work: Puisi Dari Penjara (Poems From Prison) (1973); Meniti Lautan Gelora: Sebuah Memoir Politik (Dark Clouds At Dawn: A Political Memoir) (2001); Dalam Ribuan Mimpi Gelisah: Memoir (The Long Nightmare: My 17 Years As A Political Prisoner) (2006); Suara bicara: Fragment memoir Said Zahari (2016)
- Spouse: Salamah Abdul Wahab (m. 1955; died 2004)
- Children: 4

Said Zahari (18 May 1928 – 12 April 2016) was a Singaporean writer and journalist. He was a former editor-in-chief of the Malay language newspaper Utusan Melayu, and an advocate of unbiased freedom of the press. Although he resided in Malaysia with his family, he insisted on retaining his Singapore citizenship.

== Early life ==
Said was born in Singapore to Javanese parents. He led a journalists' strike against the takeover of the newspaper by the United Malays National Organisation (UMNO) in 1961.

"At the time, Utusan Melayu—founded by Yusof Ishak—was a progressive newspaper and not a government propaganda instrument.”

Also known as Pak Said, he was detained on 2 February 1963 at 4.30 am by the Singapore Government and subsequently held for 17 years without trial. Allegations against him included being a "Communist". He now holds the distinction of being the second longest-serving political detainee in Singapore after Chia Thye Poh.

He was arrested during Operation Coldstore, a joint Malaysian and Singaporean operation to silence 117 opposition and union leaders under the Internal Security Act.

A documentary made by film maker Martyn See about his 17 years as a political prisoner in Singapore was banned by the Board of Film Censors under the Films Act, which prohibit its possession and distribution.

In the documentary, Zahari recounts the events that follows his election as chairman of Parti Rakyat Singapura on the night before Operation Coldstore.

He details his subsequent detention where he was kept in solitary confinement for long period in poor condition and explicitly threatened with death if he did not choose to confess his alleged crimes and cooperate with the authority. Part of the film shows Zahari conversing with the interviewer in fluent Mandarin, which he was taught during his forced detention without trial by fellow Chinese educated detainees, who were in the majority.

In a Singapore government media release highlighting the ban, it was stated that the documentary in question, "gives a distorted and misleading portrayal of Said Zahari's arrest and detention under the Internal Security Act in 1963".

He wrote about his experience in two books, Dark Clouds at Dawn: a Political Memoir (2001) dan The Long Nightmare: My 17 Years as a Political Prisoner (2007).

Amnesty International recognizes Zahari as a former "prisoner of conscience."

== Personal life ==
Said Zahari married Salamah Adul Wahab in 1955. He had 2 sons and 2 daughters.

Said Zahari died on 12 April 2016 at 12.30 pm (UTC+08:00) in Malaysia; his death was announced by his son Norman Said on his Facebook post.

== Legacy ==
In 2019, the Pusat Sejarah Rakyat launched the Said Zahari Young Journalist of the Year award, which was established to encourage young journalists with a special focus on social justice and human rights issues.

Among the winners were Chew Huiyee for “Once sea nomads, now stateless“ (2019), Zaim Aiman Ibrahim for “Pesawah buat benih sendiri untuk lawan kartel padi” (2020), Law Yao Hua for “Cut, Carved and Cleared, When Big Forests Go” (2021) and Liani MK for “Amid Tourism Push, Malaysia Keeps Binational Families Apart” (2022).

== Notable works ==
- Puisi Dari Penjara (Poems From Prison) (1973)
- Meniti Lautan Gelora: Sebuah Memoir Politik (Dark Clouds At Dawn: A Political Memoir) (2001)
- Dalam Ribuan Mimpi Gelisah: Memoir (The Long Nightmare: My 17 Years As A Political Prisoner) (2006)
- Suara bicara: Fragment memoir Said Zahari (2016)

== See also ==
- Mass media in Malaysia
- Abdul Rahim Kajai
- A. Samad Said
- Aziz Ishak
- Ishak Haji Muhammad
- Abdul Samad Ismail
- Usman Awang
- Yusof Ishak
