= Usman Awang =

Malaysian poet, playwright, novelist

Yang Berbahagia Dato' Usman Awang DPMP
- وان عثمان وان اواڠ
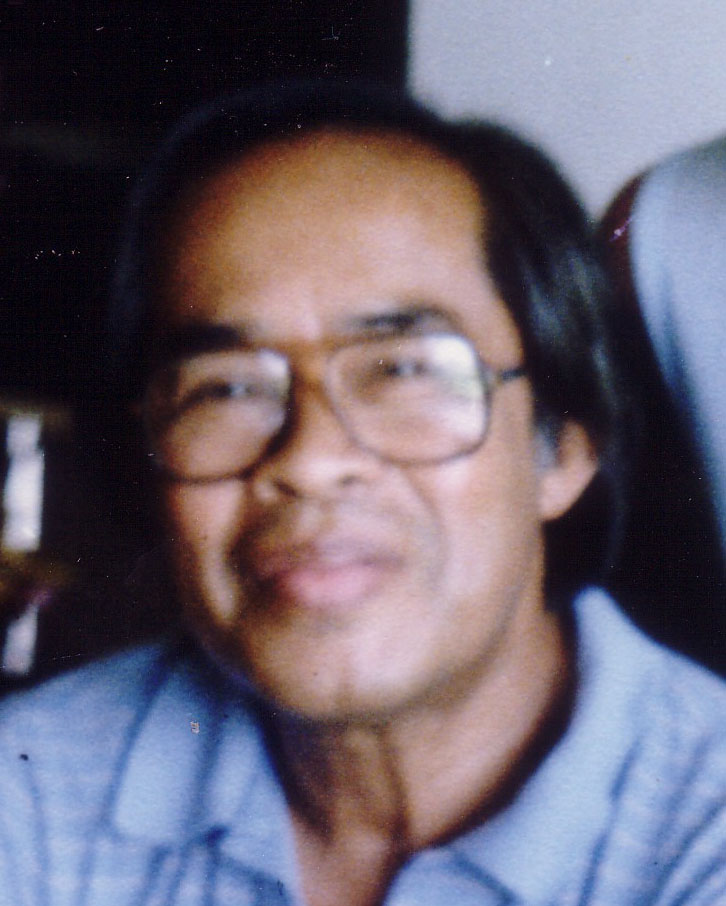
- Born: Wan Osman Wan Awang; 12 July 1929; Kuala Sedili, Johor, Malaysia
- Died: 29 November 2001 (aged 72); Kuala Lumpur
- Resting place: Bukit Kiara Muslim Cemetery, Kuala Lumpur, Malaysia
- Citizenship: Malaysia
- Occupations: Poet, short story writer, dramatist
- Writing career
- Language: Malay
- Years active: 1951-2001
- Notable awards: S.E.A. Write Award (1982)

Wan Osman Wan Awang, better known by his pen name Usman Awang, (Jawi: عثمان اواڠ, 12 July 1929 – 29 November 2001) was a Malaysian poet, playwright, novelist and Malaysian National Laureate (1983).

== Biography ==
Born into a poor peasant family in Johor, he graduated from the 6th grade of his local Malay school. During the Japanese occupation, he was kidnapped by Japanese soldiers to Singapore to do forced labour there. After the war, he joined the police force and served in Johore and Malacca from 1946 to 1951.

In 1951, he moved to Singapore, where he initially worked as a proofreader and then as a reporter for the newspaper Melayu Raya. He later joined the weekly Mingguan Melayu in 1952. His first poems and stories were published in this newspaper as well as its daily counterpart Utusan Melayu. One of Usman's most well-known pseudonyms was "Tongkat Warrant", a reference to his days as police officer, combining "warrant" with "tongkat", the Malay word for a police stick.

While in Singapore and within the context of the emergence of Malay nationalism and its struggle against British colonialism, Usman participated in the founding of the literary group Angkatan Sasterawan 50, better known as Asas '50. Inspired by their Indonesian counterpart Angkatan Sasterawan 45 and the Indonesian National Revolution, Usman's group advocated the use of the Malay language as an act of national expression and pushed the concept of "art for society's sake", as opposed to "art for art's sake". The group's output was explicitly left-wing in nature, writing about the poor, the peasantry, the struggle against poverty, and the inequity of landlordism.

He lived in Kuala Lumpur after the independence of Federation of Malaya, where he worked at the national language and literary regulatory board, the Dewan Bahasa dan Pustaka from 1963 until 1985 as one of its chief editors. From 1961 until 1965, Usman served as the first chairman of the literary organisation Pena.

He was also involved in the Keranda 152 (Coffin 152) movement in 1967, which protested the fact that Malay, the national language, was still not used as a medium of instruction and in the judiciary. The protest resulted in the National Language Act 1963/67, which made Malay the sole official language of the country.

In 1986, he initiated the creation of the Council for Translation and Creative Works of Malaysia, now known as the Institut Terjemahan Buku Malaysia (the Malaysian Book Translation Institute). He was also awarded an honorary doctorate from the University of Malaya during this period.

On November 29, 2001, Usman died of a heart attack in Kuala Lumpur at the age of 72. He was laid to rest at Bukit Kiara Muslim Cemetery, Kuala Lumpur.

== Works ==
Usman wrote several collections of poetry, more than twenty plays, numerous short stories, journalistic articles, and one novel titled Tulang-Tulang Berserakan (Scattered Bones). His works have been translated into 11 languages, including English.

== Critical evaluation ==
Soviet orientalist B. B. Parnickel assessed Usman's creativity, writing:

"With rich, euphonious, in a way traditional language, he wrote a lot and enthusiastically about his homeland, love, freedom, and the wave of his emotions affects truly magically his readers."

== Legacy ==
Several places and honours were named after him, including:

- Sekolah Kebangsaan Dato Usman Awang, a primary school at Kampung Kota Kechil in Kota Tinggi, Johor.
- Sekolah Menengah Kebangsaan Dato' Usman Awang, a secondary school which was formerly known as Sekolah Menengah Kebangsaan Taman Perling located at Taman Perling in Johor Bahru, Johor.
- Jalan Dato' Usman Awang, a road in Sedili, Johor.
- On 15 May 2014, the Usman Awang Foundation was established in Kuala Lumpur, which annually awards the National Integration Award named after him.
- In April 2016, a stamp and envelope with the image of the writer were issued.

== Awards ==
- S.E.A. Write Award (1982)
- State Literary Prize (1983)
- Malaysian National Laureate (1983)
- Honorary Doctor of University of Malaya
- Darjah Kebesaran by the Sultan of Perak and the title "Dato’" (1991)

== See also ==
- Mass media in Malaysia
- Abdul Rahim Kajai
- A. Samad Said
- Aziz Ishak
- Ishak Haji Muhammad
- Said Zahari
- Abdul Samad Ismail
- Yusof Ishak

== Bibliography ==
- Pogadaev, Victor (5 December 2001), Bapa Sastera Melayu Moden (The Father of Modern Malay Literature). – Berita Harian, .
- Pogadaev, Victor (16 March 2002), ‘Dari Bintang ke Bintang’ papar kekuatan puisi Usman ("From One Star To Another" Shows the High Level of Usman' Poetry). – Berita Harian
- Zurinah Hassan, (2006) Sasterawan negara Usman Awang (National Laureate Usman Awang). Kuala Lumpur:Dewan Bahasa dan Pustaka. ISBN 978-983-62-9164-6
- Muhammad Haji Salleh (2006), Seorang Penyair, Sebuah Benua Rusuh: Biografi Usman Awang (A Poet and Revolting Continent: Usman Awang' Biography). Kuala Lumpur: Dewan Bahasa dan Pustaka. ISBN 983-62-8759-0, ISBN 978-983-62-8759-5
- Usman Awang: Penghubung Sastera Moden Dengan Akar Tradisi (Usman Awang: A Linc Between Modern and Traditional Literature). 2003. Editor, Hamzah Hamdani. Johore Baru: Yayasan Warisan Johor, . ISBN 983-2440-04-1, ISBN 978-983-2440-04-8
- Halilah Haji Khalid (2004), Usman Awang Dalam Esei dan Kritikan (Usman Awang in Essays and Ctitics). Kuala Lumpur: Dewan Bahasa dan Pustaka, 2004.
- Chong Fah Hing (2010), Karya Usman Awang dari Persepsi Masyarakat Cina (Works of Usman Avang in the perception of the Chinese community). - Dlm. Menyirat Inspirasi. Penyelenggara Dato 'Dr. Ahmad Khamal Abdullah, Johor Bahru: YWJ Citra Holdings Sdn. Bhd.pp. 109–113. ISBN 978-967-5361-04-3
