= Ishak Haji Muhammad =

Malaysian writer

Ishak Haji Muhammad (14 November 1909 – 7 November 1991), better known as Pak Sako, was a Malaysian writer, active in the 1930s until the 1950s. He was a nationalist and his involvement began before independence and continued thereafter. He fought for the idea of the unification of Melayu Raya where Indonesia, Malaysia and Brunei are united in one collective.

He was also a prominent leader of the Labour Party of Malaya and the Socialist Front who experienced detention without trial.

The moniker Pak Sako was from the title 'Isako-san' given to him by the Japanese, which was the phonetic pronunciation of his name in the Japanese tongue. Ishak's other pseudonyms include Anwar, Hantu Raya (The Great Ghost), Isako San and Pandir Moden (The Modern-day Pandir).

== Early life ==
Ishak was born in 1909 in Kampung Bukit Seguntang, Temerloh, Pahang and received his early education at the Kg. Tengah Malay School, Temerloh in 1919 and continued his education at the Clifford High School, Kuala Lipis from 1924 to 1928. He received his certificate of education from the Raub English School in 1929. In 1930, he went to the Malay College Kuala Kangsar (MCKK) to train as an officer in the Malayan Civil Service. He held posts as Assistant Deputy District Officer, a Class III Magistrate and a language teacher before entering the literary scene. He joined the Parti Kebangsaan Melayu Malaya in 1941 before the Japanese Occupation of Malaya and became a central committee member along with Rashid Maidin, Ahmad Boestamam and Abdullah CD.

== Writings and politics ==
Ishak grew bored with his job as a British administrator and found the life of a British civil servant full of deception, favouritism and no interest in preserving the interests of the Malays who were said to have been given protection by the British. In 1934, he resigned from the Malayan Civil Service and travelled the peninsula Malaya. He later concentrated on nationalist literature and politics as a leader of the Labour Party and Socialist Front.

He contested in the 1959 general election in Temerloh where he lost to Umno's Mohamed Yusof Mahmud by 1,353 votes. In the 1964 election he ran in Bukit Bintang, coming in third behind Tan Toh Hong of the Alliance and Wong Lin Ken of PAP.

He was imprisoned twice from 1948–1953 and 1965–1966. After the collapse of the Socialist Front he joined Ahmad Boestamam in the short-lived Parti Marhaen.

== Newspaper founder ==
Ishak was the first with the idea to publish the Utusan Melayu (The Malay Post) newspaper and subsequently became the founder of the publication. He left Warta Malaya (Malayan Times) and travelled to Pahang, Kelantan and Terengganu to campaign for the establishment of the Utusan Melayu Press. He worked at the paper under Abdul Rahim Kajai as editor. During the Japanese occupation of Malaya, he became the editor of Berita Malai (Malayan News).

He continued to live in Hulu Langat even though he worked in Kuala Lumpur. He would take public transport to the office. For a while, he did have a Fiat when he was working in Rembau, but he did not drive and had to hire a driver.

== Literature ==
Ishak produced many novels, short stories, essays and memoirs as well as writing articles for the Utusan Melayu Group's newspapers. The National Library of Malaysia has, in their collection, more than 1,000 copies of his literary works.

His two most well-known works are Putera Gunung Tahan (The Prince of Mount Tahan) and Anak Mat Lela Gila (The Son of Crazy Mat Lela), which reflected his views and aspirations as a patriot and writer. They were satire novels aimed at the British and also were a critique of the British. Ishak placed importance on Malay culture in his writings and glorified Malay culture by comparing it to English culture which is said to lack quality and is too aggressive. He was also active in short story-writing.

Below is a sample of his other works:

1. Budak beca (Trishaw Boy). Marang: Mohamad bin A. Rahman, 1957
2. Judi karan (The Electric Bet). Singapore: Geliga, 1958
3. Pengantin baru (The Newlyweds). Singapore: Geliga

In his later years, he was more known as a columnist in Utusan Malaysia and Gila-Gila (a local satire magazine).

== Awards ==
As tribute for his contributions, the University of Malaya awarded him an Honorary Doctorate of Literature on 29 June 1973. On 29 May 1976, Ishaak received the Pejuang Sastera (Literary Exponent) Award from the Prime Minister.

== Death ==
He died on 7 November 1991 at 5.40 am at his home in Kampung Bukit Raya, in Hulu Langat, Selangor. He was buried in his childhood village in Temerloh, after the Friday prayers, next to the graves of his parents, in accordance with his wishes. He had been admitted to the Tawakal Hospital on 18 October after suffering from a stroke, and had just left the hospital for two weeks before he died. Earlier in the year, he had suffered another stroke and was admitted to the Kuala Lumpur General Hospital on 22 July. That attack left his right side paralysed.

As tribute, UMNO donated RM16,874.15 to his family at the close of its General Assembly that year. RM10,000 came from the UMNO headquarters while the remainder was contributed by its delegates during the assembly. It was presented by the Prime Minister Mahathir Mohamad to the Pahang Menteri Besar Mohd Khalil Yaakob to be given to his family.

== Legacy ==
Several places and honours were named after him, including:

- Jalan Pak Sako, Temerloh, Pahang
- Kolej Pak Sako, Universiti Industri Selangor (UNISEL), Bestari Jaya, Selangor
- Akademi Pak Sako, Jalan Telawi, Bangsar, Kuala Lumpur

== Election results ==
Parliament of the Federation of Malaya
Year	Constituency	Candidate	Votes	Pct	Opponent(s)	Votes	Pct	Ballots cast	Majority	Turnout
1959	P088 Temerloh	Ishak Haji Muhammad (LPM)	6,665	45.39%	Mohamed Yusof Mahmud (UMNO)	8,018	54.61%	14,808	1,353	71.47%

Parliament of Malaysia
Year	Constituency	Candidate	Votes	Pct	Opponent(s)	Votes	Pct	Ballots cast	Majority	Turnout
1964	P072 Bukit Bintang	Ishak Haji Muhammad (LPM)	5,000	23.34%	Tan Toh Hong (MCA)	9,107	42.51%	22,100	2,440	65.70%
1964	P072 Bukit Bintang	Ishak Haji Muhammad (LPM)	5,000	23.34%	Abdul Aziz Ismail (PAS)	650	3.03%	22,100	2,440	65.70%
1964	P072 Bukit Bintang	Ishak Haji Muhammad (LPM)	5,000	23.34%	Wong Lin Ken (PAP)	6,667	31.12%	22,100	2,440	65.70%

== See also ==
- Mass media in Malaysia
- Abdul Rahim Kajai
- A. Samad Said
- Aziz Ishak
- Abdul Samad Ismail
- Said Zahari
- Usman Awang
- Yusof Ishak
