= Abdul Rahim Kajai =

Malaysian journalist

- عبدالرحيم كجاي
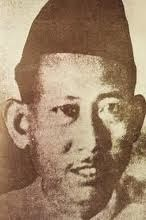
- Portrait of Abdul Rahim Kajai
- Born: Abdul Rahim Haji Salim; 1894; Setapak, Selangor, Federated Malay States (now Malaysia)
- Died: 5 December 1943 (aged 48–49); Selangor, Japanese-occupied Malaya
- Education: Setapak Malay School
- Occupations: Typesetter, journalist, novelist, editor
- Years active: 1925–1943

Abdul Rahim Kajai (1894 – 5 December 1943), born Abdul Rahim bin Haji Salim was a Malayan journalist, editor and novelist. His career began as a typesetter and was a writer for multiple local Malay newspapers. He later became a correspondent for Penang-based weekly Sinar Zaman. During his later years, he became involved in Warta Malaya and Utusan Melayu, the most prestigious Malay newspaper of the 1930s and 1940s respectively, and wrote several political and religious treatises concerning Malay rights in British Malaya. Between 1936 and 1941, he wrote 48 short stories, which were later compiled in several books published between 1949 and 1961. For his pioneering work, he was highly regarded within Malaya as one of the most prominent contributors of Malayan literature. He was given the honorific title of "Father of Malay Journalism and Short Stories" by the National Library of Malaysia (PNM).

== Early life ==
Abdul Rahim Kajai was born Abdul Rahim Haji Salim on 1894 at Setapak, Selangor, Federated Malay States. His father, Haji Salim was a Minangkabau migrant from nagari Kajai, a village at West Sumatra, which became the basis for his later pen-name, Kajai. Kajai received elementary education at the Setapak Malay School (Malay: Sekolah Melayu Setapak) and passed his examinations in 1905. His academic achievements qualified him for enrollment at an English school in Kuala Lumpur, but this notion was rejected by his parents. Instead, in connection to his father's catering business for Muslim pilgrims, Kajai was sent to Mecca in 1906 for further studies in Arabic and Islam. He later returned from Mecca in 1909, and worked as a typesetter for publishing houses at Kuala Lumpur and Singapore until 1913. His father, Haji Salim, died in 1913. This forced Kajai to return to Mecca for three years until 1917.

== Journalistic career ==
During his time in Mecca, he was inspired by the events of the Battle of Jarrab in 1915, which made Kajai interested in journalism. After his return to Malaya, he was employed as a writer in January 1925 in Sinar Zaman, a weekly based at Penang. For three years, he wrote short stories about his life in Mecca until 1927, when he returned to Malaya once more when his mother died.

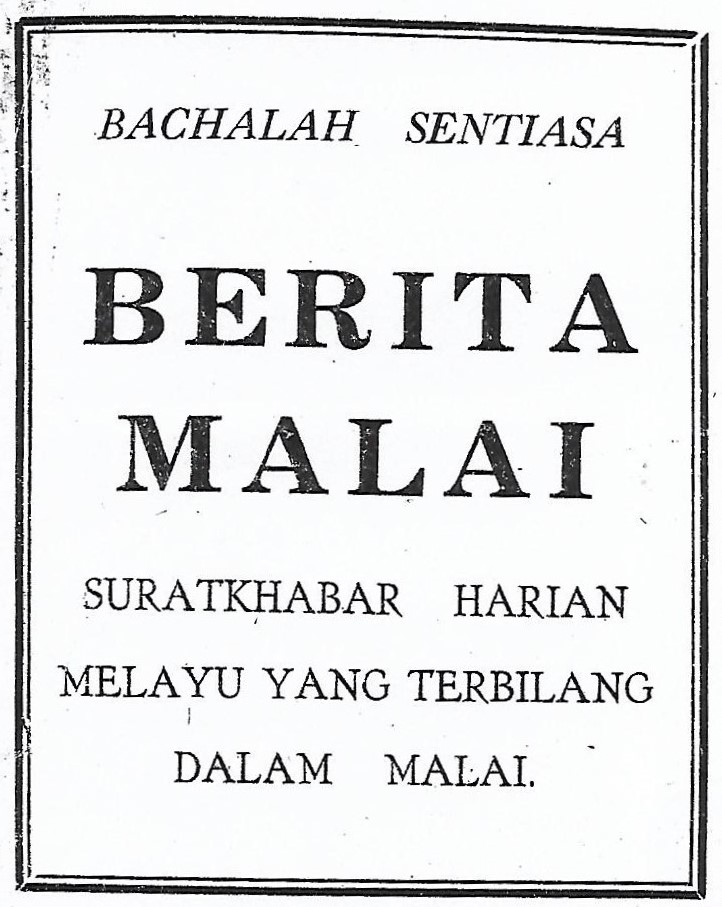
Berita Malai (1943)

After his return, he became a writer for Saudara, a weekly newspaper at Kuala Lumpur led by Syed Sheikh Syed Ahmad Al-Hadi. It was during that time he began to adopt the nickname "Kajai" as a token of remembrance of his father. In September 1930, he was formally promoted as the editor for Saudara. He left the newspaper shortly after and joined Majlis as an editor in late-1931. However, he left after disagreements over the publishing frequencies of the newspaper.

In January 1935, he joined the editorial team of Warta Malaya. The Singapore-based newspaper became one the largest circulated Malay dailies of Southeast Asia of the 1930s, and was a hub of Malay nationalistic journalism of that era. During his tenure in Warta Malaya, he wrote political essays discussing Malay rights. Warta Malaya, written in Jawi alphabets, became the first Malay newspaper to directly subscribe to global news agencies. Kajai later involved himself in Warta Jenaka, a pictorial weekly, and Warta Ahad, a weekly newspaper. In 1941, Warta Malaya ceased publication after it failed to compete with Utusan Melayu (now Utusan Malaysia). Kajai, along with other members of Warta Malaya's editorial team, went on to work as an editor for Utusan Melayu, and later for Mustika and Utusan Zaman (companions of Utusan Melayu).

On 20 December 1941, Kajai left Singapore for Kuala Lumpur after the Japanese invasion of Malaya commenced. With the approval of the Japanese-occupied government of Malaya, he began work on a Japanese-supported Malay newspaper known as Perubahan Baru (Malay: New Change). He returned to Singapore in 1943 and launched work on his final newspaper, Berita Malai (or known as Malay Sinpo), a merger between Utusan Melayu and Warta Malaya. Berita Malai involved several important Malay politicians and writers of the early 20th-century, such as Ishak Haji Muhammad (alias Pak Sako), Yusof Ishak and Abdul Samad Ismail (alias Pak Samad).

== Personal life ==
Kajai married his wife in 1913. Kajai became ill in August 1942. He died on 5 December 1943, aged 48. By the time of his death, he had written 48 short stories, which were later compiled into publications in 1949 and 1961.

== Legacy ==
Kajai is often known as a leading pioneer of Malay journalism. He was later given the honorific title of "Father of Malay Journalism" for his work in six different newspapers between 1925 and 1943.

In 1982, the Malaysian Press Institute (MPI) created the Kajai Award, which became the most prestigious journalism award in Malaysia. The first Kajai Award was given to Rosmah Majid of Utusan Melayu in 1982.

== Selected works ==
- Saduran Cerita Dzul-Ruhain (1930–1931)
- Panduan Wartawan (1941)
- Cerita Awang Putat (1941)
- Pusaka Kajai (collection of short stories, published 1949)
- Lain Padang Lain Belalang (collection of short stories, published 1961)
- Banyak Udang Banyak Garam (collection of short stories, published 1961)

== See also ==
- Mass media in Malaysia
- Abdul Samad Ismail
- Onn Jaafar
- A. Samad Said
- Aziz Ishak
- Ishak Haji Muhammad
- Said Zahari
- Usman Awang
- Yusof Ishak
