= Hikayat Abu Samah =

Text of Betawi literature adapted from Malay literature

Hikayat Abu Samah is a text of Betawi literature adapted from Malay literature. This manuscript is classified into Islamic legend because it originates from Islamic history. This can be proven if you look at the characters and events in this manuscript that really existed and have happened, such as Ali, Uthman, and other Prophet Muhammad companions. Manuscripts of Hikayat Abu Samah are stored in several places, such as National Museum of Indonesia stores six manuscripts, and Leiden University Library stores four manuscripts, School of Oriental and African Studies, and University of London Library stores one script. One of the manuscripts which is now in the National Museum of Indonesia, was copied by Muhammad Cing Saidullah in 1823.
