= Asas '50 =

The Generation of Writers of 1950 (Angkatan Sasterawan 1950), better known as Asas '50, is the first and oldest literary association in post-war Singapore. It was founded on 6 August 1950, with a stated philosophy of "Art for Society" (Seni untuk Masyarakat).

Asas '50 was formed in the interest of developing Malayan literature. Asas '50 currently works to promote and propagate literature through seminars, workshops, forums, dialogues, courses etc.

Asas '50 emphasized the use of literature as a means of achieving political change.

== History ==
Asas '50 emerged from the journalistic milieu in post-war Singapore, then a crown colony, in the context of escalating political repression by British colonial authorities during a period of increasing national consciousness and communist insurgency. Malay nationalism represented a major influence on the philosophy of the association, and many of its members' writings were left-wing in nature, featuring socially progressive themes. The association sought to safeguard Malay culture and language, refine and promote the latter as the lingua franca of Malaya, foster nationalism, and to advance the intellectual awareness of the Malay. Seni Untuk Masyarakat (Art for Society) was adopted as its motto.

The association was involved in the push for the independence of Malaya in the 1950s. As many of its founders were members of the Parti Kebangsaan Melayu Malaya, their conception of an independent Malaya was that of a constituent part of a Greater Indonesia or Melayu Raya. Inspiration was taken from the Indonesian writers' association, Angkatan Sasterawan 45, for its name, and its political philosophy from the Indonesian National Revolution. Indonesian literature had an outsized influenced on the output of Malayan writers, and the intelligentsia of both nations were often in contact with one another.

The early activities of Asas '50 were described by Keris Mas as follows:

In the field of literature, the proponents of ASAS 50 adopted a new breathe of style, employing a mode of language that is fresh, departing from the preceding genre of writers, propounding the themes of societal awareness, politics and culture with the aim of revitalising the spirit of freedom, the spirit of independence of a people (bangsa) of its own unique sense of honour and identity, upholding justice and combating oppression... We criticised societal backwardness and those whom we regard as the instruments responsible for the birth of such backwardness. We criticised colonialism and its instruments, that is, the elite class, those whose consciousness have been frozen by the influence of feudalism and myths, and superstition that has been enmeshed with religion.

An important event in the early history of Asas '50 was the debate on the purpose of literature that occurred between two groups. The Utusan Melayu group, headed by Asraf, Asas '50's chief ideologue, and the Majalah Hiburan group headed by Hamzah Hussien. The crux of the debate was whether to follow "Art for Society" (Seni untuk Masyarakat) or "Art for Art's Sake" (Seni untuk Seni). According to researcher Athi Sivan, Hamzah propagated the Gautierian understanding of art and called to distance Asas '50 from the left-wing ideologies prevalent at that time in Singapore, especially in Utusan Melayu. The debate resulted in Hamzah leaving Asas '50 to form a new literary organisation. Following this debate, Asas '50 became less active after 1955, when several of its main members (Keris Mas, Usman Awang, etc.) left for mainland Malaya.

An attempt initiated by Asas '50 to absorb the splinter literary groups such as Grup Gelorasa and Pass into Asas '50 was carried out in 1974. A new slogan "Literature for the Community" was coined to provide a mutual understanding and mission among the new members of Asas '50. The slogan was intentionally generic and without ideological leanings. It was accepted by all the new members of Asas '50. However, the purpose of Asas '50 had also changed, as it was no longer necessary to fight for the independence and physical extrication of the community. For this reason, Asas '50's stated aim was to free the community from psychological and intellectual oppression left behind during the reign of the colonial masters and the Japanese cccupation. Asas '50's mission is still schooled in the concept of "Literature for the Community" even though it has since changed its slogan.

The National Library Board (NLB) of Singapore has recognised Asas '50 for its "Singapore Literary Pioneers Gallery" and NLB Online Repository of Artistic Works (NORA) projects. This includes a database collection of Malay writers and manuscripts. Another project piloted by NLB and Asas '50 was the "Potret Tun Seri Lanang." In this project, Asas '50 acted as the middleman in obtaining the literary works of the Tun Sri Lanang award winners, which included books, private collections, and more. These were displayed at the special collections section of the NLB.

Asas '50 has also published "Leksikon", a directory of descriptions of 70 important writers in Singapore from 1965 to 2005. The launch of "Leksikon" also made Asas '50 the first association to have held an event at the new NLB building at Victoria Street.

The organisation has been Singapore's official representative in learning the development of the Malay literature in the region. The association works with regional literary associations such as Gapena (Malaysia), Asterawani (Brunei), Horisons (Indonesia) and others. Many of its members are also involved in activities organised and held by the Dewan Bahasa dan Pustaka (DBP) of Malaysia, Mastera and Mabbim.

Asas '50 has awarded the Malay Literary Award (Anugerah Persuratan), previously known as the Malay Literary Prize (Hadiah Sastera) to writers since the 1970s.

== Impact ==
=== On the Malay language ===
Asas '50's worked towards the development of the Malay language and was described by kakiseni.com as

the movement that championed the use and development of the Malay language

The association initiated the 3rd Malay Language Congress (Kongres Bahasa ke-3) in 1956, which saw the introduction of the Roman script to Malay. Jawi writing was initially the modus operandi. This change simplifies language learning, as Roman spelling is also used in the English language. Research and study of materials and sources from the West were thus made more accessible to Malaysians. Roman spelling has since eclipsed the use of Jawi in daily matters and in education.

=== On the Malay film industry ===
Many filmmakers involved in the Malay film industry during the 1950s and 1960s were members of the association, including actors and directors Jamil Sulong, Hamzah Hussin, and S. Roomai Noor.

P. Ramlee, who was considered one of the most popular actors in that period, regularly interacted with the association's members, and his statements often echoed the group's goals. Ramlee's film magazine, Bintang (Star) also shared an office building with the association and was edited by Fatimah Murad, the wife of Asraf, who was considered the association's leading ideologue.

Asraf capitalised on this avenue and network to promote the ideologies held by Asas '50. Film critics have observed this ideological connection in the film "Bujang Lapok". The film contained satirical critique of the greater Malay culture of the time. Another trait prevalent in these films was the use of the actors' real name such as "Ramlee", "Sudin" and "Aziz." This was P. Ramlee's method of highlighting the emotional reality of the time.

=== On local media and news ===
The local newspaper has also followed the principle of "Literature for the Community" by publishing literary works that spoke of the latest issues faced by the community. These poems, shorts stories, and essays focused on issues of the community from the social, religious, political, and economical perspectives. The number of literary works published in the local newspaper totaled 3,200 from 1,600 writers as of 1965. This reception has caused Singapore Malay literature to be referred to as "newspaper literature (sastera akhbar)." Inadvertently, Asas '50's mission was proliferated by the local newspaper, which held many of the same ideologies as the literary association.

== Youth wing ==
The Asas '50 youth wing was started in 2002 with the mission of shaping the next generation of leaders and activists in the Malay literary scene. This aim was advocated for by Masuri S.N, who believed that the strength of an association is reliant on the youths, who will eventually receive the baton to carry the association into the next phase of its mission. The younger members of Asas '50 comprise a large portion of the trainee teachers of the National Institute of Education Townsville Campus. Today, a number of these members are appointment holders in the association's executive committee.

== Publications ==
To date, Asas '50 has published many books. However, a number of these publications were only produced in the early 2000s, but other books were published independently by members of Asas '50. Among the publications was the 2005 release of Abdul Ghani Hamid's Petikan Rasa/Extracts of Feelings. Funded by National Arts Council via the Singapore Cultural Medallion Grant, the book was a bilingual compilation of Abdul Ghani Hamid's poems and paintings. Another book published by Asas '50 was "Memoir Perjalanan Mas" in 2004. This historical biography of Muhammad Ariff Ahmad depicted the life and struggles of Mas. This book highlights the importance of Muhammad Ariff Ahmad in the Malay culture, language, and literary arena. Inadvertently, this book has become the unofficial documentation of the Malay literary movement history in Singapore.

The publishing of the first Malay writer's directory called Leksikon was a collaborative effort with the NLB, and it was the first of its kind in the Singapore Malay literature. The book provides detailed information on the creative writers of Singapore since 1965. Another Asas '50 publication was an anthology of poems and short stories called "Menyongsong Pelangi" in 2005. This anthology comprises literary works contributed by young writers and is released in commemoration of Asas '50's 55 years celebration.

== Bibliography ==
- Abdul Samat Ali & Mohamed Latiff Mohamed, Perjalananku : Karya Sayembara Cerpen Pelajar Menengah 2008, Angkatan Sasterawan '50, Singapore, 2008.
- Anuar Othman & Mana Sikana, Jatuh Ke Laut Menjadi Pulau : Pemikiran Sastera Malaysia & Singapura, Anuar Othman & Associates Media Enterprise, Singapore, 2003.
- Anwar Ridhwan, Jati Diri Pasca Asas '50, Dewan Bahasa dan Pustaka, Kuala Lumpur, 1999.
- Asmah Haji Omar, Ensiklopedia Bahasa Melayu, Dewan Bahasa dan Pustaka, Kuala Lumpur, 2008.
- Athi Sivan, Hamzah Hussin: Sekitar Pemikiran Seni untuk Seni, Penerbit UKM, Bangi, 1997.
- Masuri SN, Dalam Merenung Dalam, Angkatan Sasterawan '50, Singapore, 2007.
- Mohamed Latiff Mohamed, Bila Rama-Rama Patah Sayapnya, Angkatan Sasterawan '50, Singapore, 2007.
- Mohamed Pitchay Gani Bin Mohamed Abdul Aziz, Melayu Singapura Dalam Kritikan, Angkatan Sasterawan '50, Singapore, 2002.
- Mohamed Pitchay Gani Bin Mohamed Abdul Aziz, Leksikon: Direktori Penulis Melayu Singapura Pasca 1965, National Library Board, Singapore, 2005.
- Muhammad Ariff Ahmad, Perjalanan MAS, Angkatan Sasterawan '50, Singapore, 2007.
- Muhammad Ariff Ahmad, NILAM : Nilai Adat Melayu, Majlis Pusat, Singapore, 2007.
- Nirwana Haliza Bte Mohamed Halil, Sastera Sebagai Alat Alternatif Menangani Masalah Sosial in Aktivis Academic Journal 8, National Institute of Education, Nanyang Technological University, Singapore, 2008.
