= Malaysian Press Institute =

Malaysian foundation

- Institut Akhbar Malaysia
- Abbreviation: MPI / IAM
- Formation: 1966 (as South East Asia Press Centre); 1974 (as Institut Akhbar Malaysia); 2007 (as Malaysian Press Institute foundation)
- Type: Journalism training institute
- Headquarters: Cyberjaya, Malaysia
- Region served: Malaysia
- Website: mpi.my

The Malaysian Press Institute (MPI) is a foundation dedicated to journalism training, professional development, and media research in Malaysia. It was formally established as a foundation under the Companies Act on 13 April 2007, after previously operating as the Institut Akhbar Malaysia (IAM), a society registered under the Societies Act.

== History ==
The origins of the Institute trace back to the South East Asia Press Centre (SEAPC), which was set up in 1966 to provide journalism training in Malaysia and the wider Southeast Asian region. When international funders withdrew, SEAPC was reconstituted and officially registered in 1974 as the Institut Akhbar Malaysia (IAM), though its training operations had begun around 1968.

IAM’s early focus was on short, practical courses for non-graduate journalists at a time when university-level journalism programmes were still emerging in Malaysia.

In the 1980s, IAM launched the Hadiah Kewartawanan Malaysia (HKM), the national journalism awards, in 1980 and later issued the Canons of Journalism on 20 May 1989.

On 13 April 2007, the organisation was reconstituted as a foundation under the Companies Act and adopted the name Malaysian Press Institute (MPI). Since then, MPI has expanded its scope to include training programmes, corporate workshops, publications, and research, and the Institute launched its own e-Journal in 2025.

== Offices ==
Over its five decades, the Institute has moved several times, with locations in Bangsar, Brickfields, Petaling Jaya, and Taman Tun Dr. Ismail. In 2009, it relocated to Jalan Bukit Ledang, and in 2018 it shifted to Radius Cyberjaya.

== Functions ==
MPI’s activities include:

- Conducting journalism and media training courses;
- Organising the annual Hadiah Kewartawanan Malaysia (HKM) awards;
- Publishing codes and canons of journalism ethics;
- Producing publications and research outputs, including its e-Journal;
- Serving as an industry forum bridging media practitioners, academia, and policymakers.

== See also ==
- Media in Malaysia
- Journalism in Malaysia
- Malaysian National News Agency
