= Arena Wati =

Malaysian writer

Muhammad Dahlan Abdul Baing
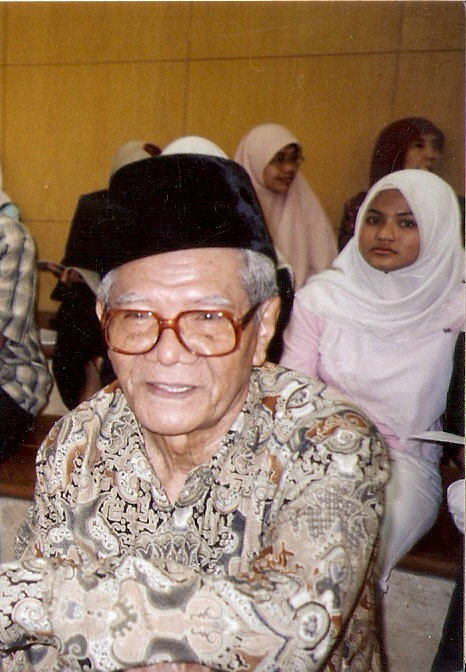
- Born: Muhammad Dahlan Abdul Baing; 30 July 1925; Jeneponto, Makassar, South Sulawesi, Dutch East Indies (now Indonesia)
- Died: 25 January 2009 (aged 83); Kuala Lumpur
- Resting place: Tanah Perkuburan Islam; Bukit Kiara
- Citizenship: Malaysia
- Occupation: Writer
- Writing career
- Pen name: Arena Wati
- Language: Malay
- Years active: 1959–2009
- Notable awards: S.E.A. Write Award

Muhammad Dahlan Abdul Baing (or Andi Mohammad Dahlan Andi Buyung) (30 July 1925 – 25 January 2009), whose pseudonym was Arena Wati, was a Malaysian writer. He was declared as the Malaysian National Laureate in 1988. His writings were in the Malay language. He also known as Duta Muda dan Patria.

== Life ==
He was born in Jeneponto, Makassar, Dutch East Indies (now Indonesia). Arena received his early education in Dutch schools, Hollands Indische School, before the outbreak of World War II. During World War II, at the age of 18, Arena Wati became a seaman. His experience in this field improved his skills in writing and produced a good novel. He completed his secondary education at Makassar in 1953. After graduating from school, Arena Wati became a journalist and worked with publishing company in Singapore, and then to Johor Bahru and Brunei. During this period, he has become a citizen of Malaysia and between 1962 and 1974, and later served as the editor of Pustaka Antara. Most of the work of Arena Wati based on academic, imaginative, thought-provoking and scathing criticism and venomous.

He was married with six children. He died of lung cancer. He was buried at the Bukit Kiara Muslim cemetery.

== Works ==
Arena Wati's works often focus on the struggles of the poor and the disadvantaged. His work "Sandera" is widely viewed as one of the finest Malaysian novels. His first novel is a story of three cruises (Kisah Tiga Kapal) in 1959 where his published in Singapore.

- Lingkaran (1962),
- Sandera (1971),
- Rontok (1980),
- Eno (1985),
- Syair Pangeran Syarif (1989),
- Syair Pangeran Syarif Hasyim Al-Qudsi (1989),
- Syair Perang Cina Di Monterado (1989),
- Burung Badai (1990),
- Turina (1991),
- Citra (1991),
- Memoir Arena Wati Enda Gulingku (1991),
- Ombak Samudera(1992),
- Meniti Kala (1993),
- Panrita (1993),
- Sudara (1994),
- Mevrouw Toga (1995),
- Begawan (1996),
- Koleksi Terpilih Arena Wati (1996),
- Sukma Angin (1999),
- Getar-Getir Maya Kumpulan Cerpen (2000),
- Trilogi Busa (2002),
- Armageddon (2004),
- Kutukan Dari Langit (2004),
- Langkah Pertama Kumpulan Cerpen Awal 1954-1959 (2004),
- 7 Tegak Bersama (2005),
- Warna Sukma Usia Muda (2005),
- Cakra Waruga (2006).

=== Awards ===
His numerous awards included:-

- South East Asia Literary award – the SEA Write Award, an award presented by the King of Thailand, and his 1988 investiture as the National Laureate.
- Anugerah Sasterawan Negara (1987).
- Sukma Angin (1999) won the Literature Prize Perdana Malaysia 1998/99
- Sastera Majlis Sastera Asia Tenggara (Mastera Literary Award) 2003.
