= Malacca Literature Museum =

Museum in Melaka Tengah, Malacca, Malaysia

- Muzium Sastera Melaka
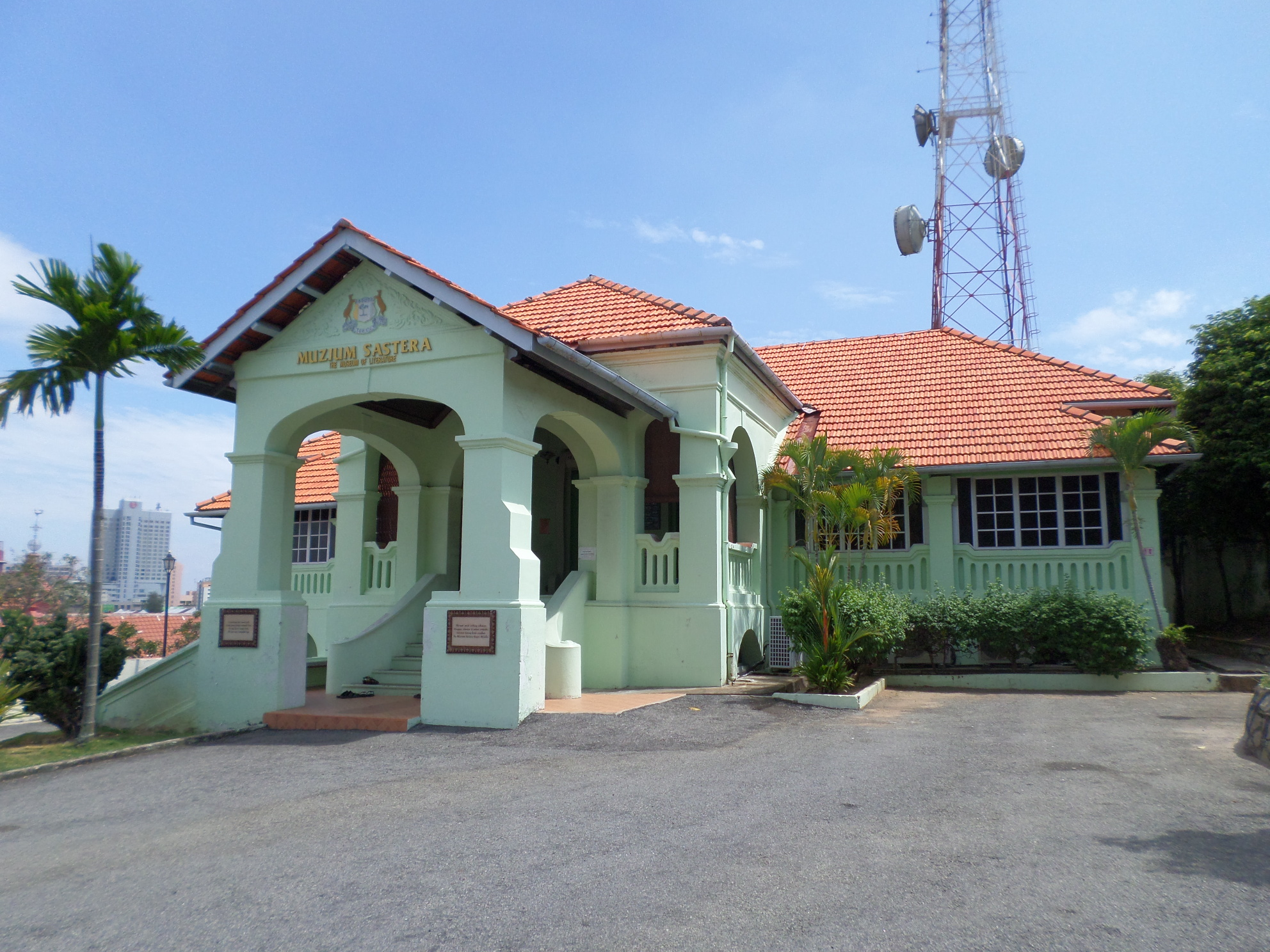
- Established: 1984
- Location: Malacca City, Malacca, Malaysia
- Coordinates: 2°11′37.7″N 102°14′58.4″E
- Type: museum

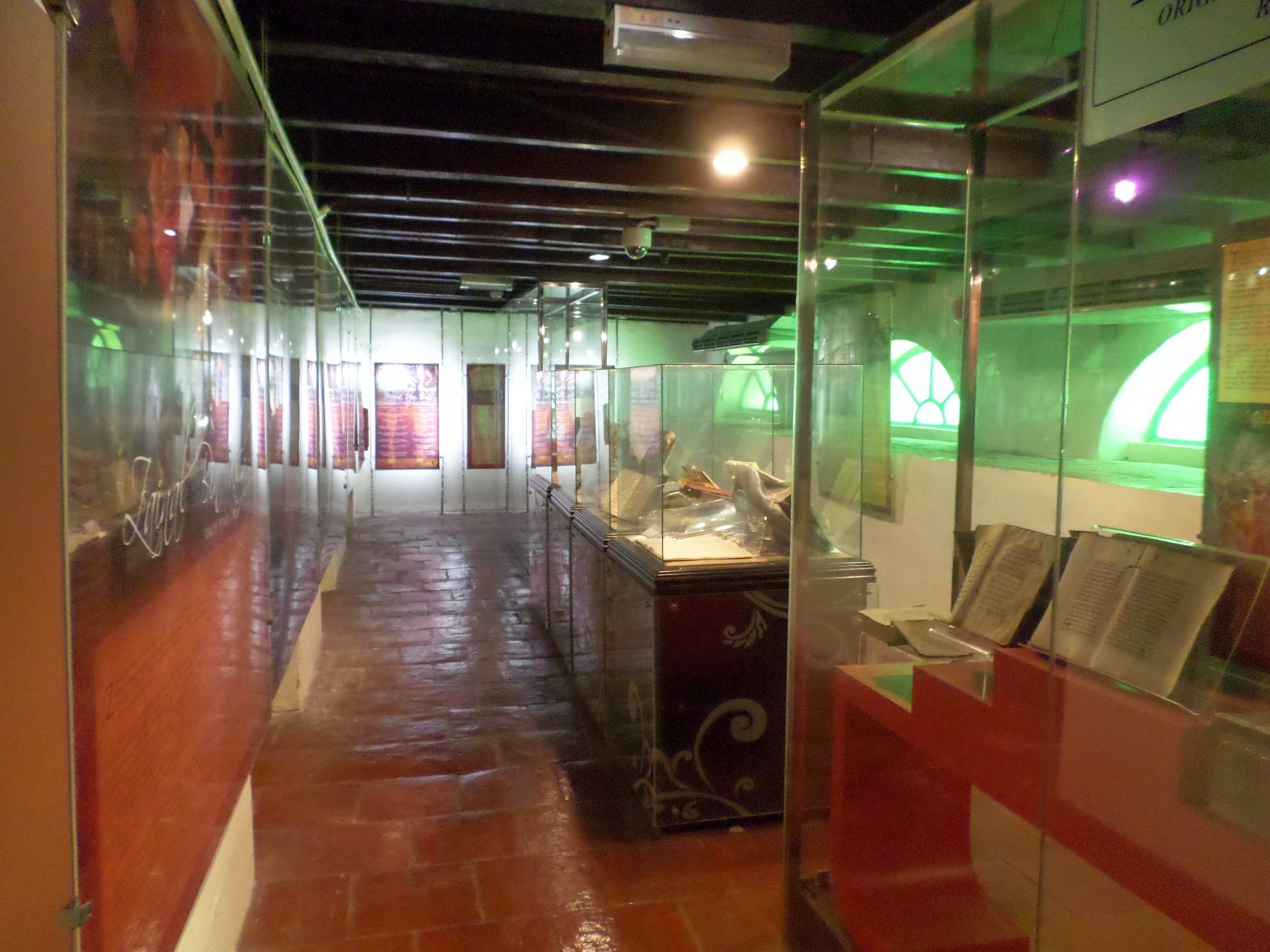
Museum exhibition hall

Malacca Literature Museum (Malay: Muzium Sastera Melaka) is a museum about Malaysian literary works in Malacca City, Malacca, Malaysia, which resembles the structural design of a residence and was officiated by Chief Minister Mohd Zin Abdul Ghani in 1984.

The museum's building was built during the British Malaya on St. Paul's Hill and was formerly used as residence and prison. It also housed the Malacca State Development Corporation (Malay: Perbadanan Kemajuan Negeri Melaka) until 1974 before it was moved to Ayer Keroh as its current location.

The museum exhibits material pertaining to the written history of Malacca, the writings of Munsyi Abdullah and local Malay folklore. It also displays the growth of literature from the period of the Malacca Sultanate to contemporary literary scene. The front of the museum displays a mural that depicts of evolution of writing in Malaysia from the use of stone tablets, to the introduction of Arabic script, the precursor to Jawi, ending with the modern tools of the computer and keyboard. A large section is devoted to the tale of Hang Tuah. The museum also showcases the earliest known Malay letters, dating to the 16th century, the contributions of Malay authors, and the influence of Islam on the nation's laws. Displays are done using graphical panels, exhibition boxes, audio visual and kiosk information.

== See also ==
- List of museums in Malaysia
- List of tourist attractions in Malacca
