= Berita Harian (Malaysia) =

Malaysian daily newspaper

- Front page of Berita Harian from 5 March 2020.
- Type: Daily newspaper
- Format: Compact
- Publisher: The New Straits Times Press (M) Bhd
- Founded: 1 July 1957; 69 years ago (original); 1 September 1972; 54 years ago (current)
- Political alignment: UMNO
- Language: Malay
- Headquarters: Balai Berita 31, Jalan Riong, 59100 Bangsar, Kuala Lumpur, Malaysia
- Circulation: 106,754 (daily); 109,811 (BH Ahad); 3,766 (daily E-paper); 3,765 (BH Ahad E-paper); *Source: Audit Bureau of Circulations, Malaysia – July to December 2015
- Website: www.bharian.com.my

Berita Harian (lit. 'Daily News' abbreviated as BH) is a Malay-language daily newspaper published in Malaysia. It is published by the New Straits Times Press part of the Media Prima conglomerate. Its Sunday edition, BH Ahad (formerly Berita Minggu), was launched on 10 July 1960. This newspaper is indirectly connected to the Singaporean paper of the same name, both papers originated from a single publication founded on 1 July 1957 but spun off in September 1972.

The newspaper adopted the Roman script at its founding, the first morning Malay language newspaper on the formerly British-colonized side of the Malayosphere to do so in contrast to contemporaries like Utusan Melayu, which continued to publish the Jawi script. Over the decades, it underwent several format changes, transitioning from a broadsheet to a compact format in 2008.

It has also contributed to Malay-language education through pullout publications. Berita Harian is published from Balai Berita, Kuala Lumpur, and maintains an online presence at www.bharian.com.my.

== History ==
Berita Harian launched on 1 July 1957. Abdul Samad Ismail was appointed as its first editor in April 1958.

In 1960, a Sunday edition of the paper was launched, originally titled Berita Minggu it was renamed to BH Ahad in 2012.

=== Format changes ===
In 1966, BH introduced a revised masthead. In 1974, the page count increased from 10 to 12, allowing for expanded content, including trade, photography, and foreign news.

In 1989, the sports section expanded with the launch of Jaguh, a 16-page pullout.

On 5 July 2008, BH transitioned from a broadsheet to a compact format. This shift included structural updates and the introduction of youth-oriented content.

With the rise of digital media, BH established an online platform and mobile services offering digital news content. On 1 July 2012, BH revamped its sections, renaming Ekonomi to Bisnes, Ratu to Famili, and Rona to Kembara. Additional changes in typography, layout, and pagination were also introduced.

== Content ==
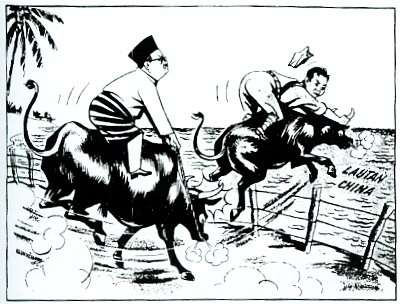
Editorial cartoon by Peng, featured in the paper's weekly Saturday column (Hidangan Hari Sabtu) dated 7 September 1957.

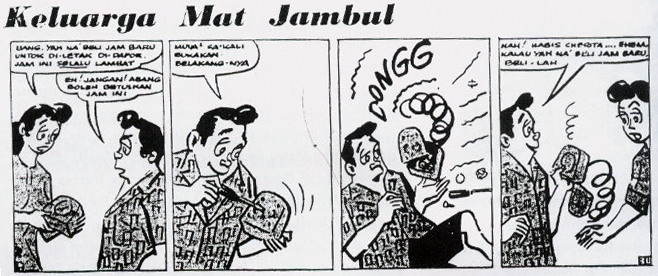
"Mat Jambul Family" cartoon strip, published on 14 May 1961, in Berita Harian.

=== Comics ===
Early on, the newspaper regularly prioritised cartoons and comic strips. The tagline on the first published issue of the paper read "Akhbar untuk Keluarga" (lit. 'A Newspaper for the Whole Family') and included front page text highlighting the inclusion of "the largest collection [of comic pictures] to be found in a newspaper in Malaya."

The newspaper initially featured translated Western comic strips, but in December 1958, the newspaper began a regular competition where readers could send original comic panels and cartoons written in Malay. Winners would be given a cash prize and have their contribution featured in the next issue of the paper.

=== Educational supplements ===
BH introduced several educational initiatives, including the Berita Pelajar and Minda Pelajar pullouts, to engage students. In 1994, the newspaper launched Berita Komputer, providing technology-focused content for readers interested in computing and digital literacy.

=== Political positions ===
A share majority in Berita Harian's parent company Media Prima is held by members of the right wing United Malays National Organisation under Gabungan Kesturi Sdn Bhd. Its editorials during the 2013 and 2018 general elections, as with that of Utusan Malaysia, were often rhetorically charged invoking fears of a decay in "the dignity of [the Malay] race, the sanctity of [Islam]..." while denouncing "those who have a liberal view about everything", saying that "liberalism and pluralism will engulf the nation"; arguing the rule of an alliance between the opposition People's Justice and Democratic Action parties will begin "the fall of Islam as the religion of the Federation".

== See also ==
- Sister publications:
  Harian Metro
- Other Malay language newspapers in Malaysia:
  Utusan Malaysia
  Kosmo!
  Utusan Borneo, a newspaper serving the states of Sabah and Sarawak
  Sinar Harian
