= Malaysian National Laureate =

Malaysian National Laureate (Malay: Sasterawan Negara) are individuals who were awarded the Laureate for their contributions to Malay literature.

== List of recipients for the Malaysian National Laureate ==
1. 1981 : Kamaludin Muhammad (Keris Mas)
2. 1983 : Shahnon Ahmad
3. 1985 : Usman Awang
4. 1987 : A. Samad Said
5. 1989 : Muhammad Dahlan Abdul Biang Andi (Arena Wati)
6. 1991 : Muhammad Haji Salleh
7. 1993 : Noordin Hassan
8. 1995 : Abdullah Hussain
9. 2001 : Syed Othman bin Syed Omar Al-Yahya (S. Othman Kelantan)
10. 2009 : Anwar Ridhwan
11. 2011 : Ahmad Kamal Abdullah
12. 2013 : Baharuddin Zainal (Baha Zain)
13. 2015 : Zurinah Hassan
14. 2017 : Siti Zainon Ismail
15. 2023 : Rahman Shaari
16. 2026 : Mana Sikana
