= Sinar Harian =

Malay language newspaper

- Front page of the inaugural Selangor & KL edition
- Type: Daily newspaper
- Format: Compact
- Owner: Kumpulan Karangkraf
- Publisher: Sinar Karangkraf Sdn Bhd
- Editor: Rozaid Rahman
- Deputy editor: Zamri Rambli; Junhairi Alyasa
- News editor: Ruzy Adila Idris
- Founded: 31 March 2006
- Language: Malay
- Headquarters: Shah Alam, Selangor
- Circulation: 65,000–80,000
- Website: www.sinarharian.com.my

Sinar Harian (lit. Daily Light) is a Malay-language daily compact newspaper published in Shah Alam, Malaysia. Launched on 31 March 2006 by Kumpulan Karangkraf through subsidiary Sinar Karangkraf Sdn Bhd, it initially covered East Coast states before expanding nationally by September 2007. Priced at RM1.80 (2025), it emphasizes regional news and community issues.

== Digital expansion ==
The newspaper launched Sinar Daily in 2020 as its English-language digital arm, offering:

- Real-time political updates
- East Coast flood monitoring
- Investigative journalism collaborations with Malaysiakini and The Vibes

Mobile apps introduced in 2021 feature:

- Push notifications for major news
- E-paper subscriptions
- Podcast integrations (e.g., Sinar Harian Bicara)

== Public engagement ==
Known for organizing townhall forums since 2012, its events have featured:

- Opposition leader Anwar Ibrahim (2014)
- Muhyiddin Yassin during the 2021 political crisis
- Civil society groups like BERSIH and PERKASA

Critics note uneven representation in panels, with 60% of 2015–2020 speakers affiliated with the ruling coalition.

== Features ==
Sinar Harian distinguishes itself through extensive regional coverage, with localized pull-out sections comprising over 50% of its content. As of 2024, it publishes four regional editions:

- Northern: Perak, Penang, Kedah, Perlis
- Central: Selangor, Negeri Sembilan, Kuala Lumpur, Putrajaya
- East Coast: Pahang, Terengganu, Kelantan
- Southern: Malacca, Johor

The newspaper employs district-level correspondents ("Skuad Cakna") in each coverage area, a practice documented in its 2021 editorial guidelines.

=== Political reporting ===
During the 2013 People's Uprising rally, Sinar Harian provided comparatively neutral coverage versus competitors:

- Published rally attendance figures (45,000 by police estimates)
- Included speeches from both government and opposition figures
- Contrasted with Utusan Malaysia’s editorial calling it a "failed protest"

A Universiti Malaya study later cited this event as demonstrating the paper’s editorial independence relative to government-linked media.

== Notable incidents ==
- The newspaper's slogan Cakna & Dinamik (lit. "Concerned & Dynamic") incorporates cakna, a lexical item from Terengganu Malay dialect reflecting its East Coast roots.
- In February 2018, Sinar Harian published a controversial article titled "Cara Kenal Pasti Homoseksual" ("How to Identify Homosexuals") featuring disputed behavioral checklists and commentary from conservative scholar Hanafiah Abdul Malek. The piece drew criticism from LGBT rights groups and the Human Rights Commission of Malaysia (SUHAKAM), who called it discriminatory. The Ministry of Communications and Multimedia Malaysia later issued a warning to the publication under Malaysia's media content guidelines.

== Awards and recognition ==
Notable awards
Year	Award	Category
2013	Malaysian Press Institute	Best Regional Newspaper
2018	Petronas Journalism Awards	Environmental Reporting
2022	Digital Media Awards Asia	Best News Website (Malaysia)
