= New Straits Times Press =

Malaysian conglomerate of publishing companies

The New Straits Times Press (Malaysia) Berhad
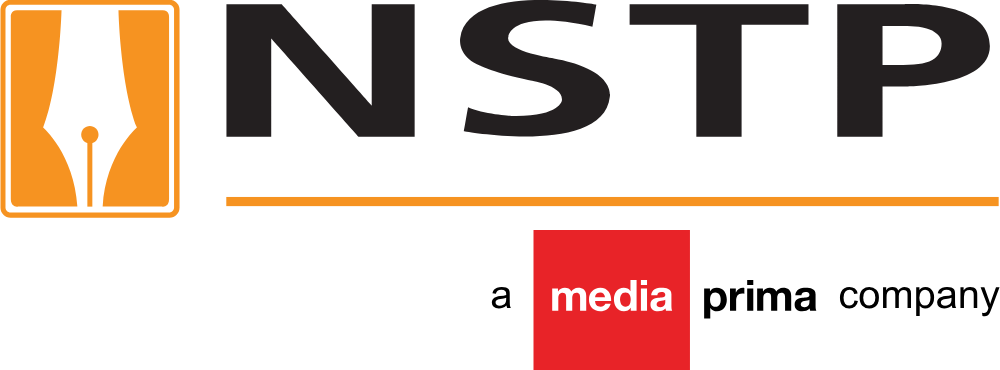
- Formerly: The Caxton Press (1957) Sdn Bhd
- Type: Private limited company
- Industry: Media
- Founded: 31 January 1973; 53 years ago
- Founder: Tengku Razaleigh Hamzah
- Headquarters: Balai Berita Bangsar, 31, Jalan Riong, 59100 Kuala Lumpur, Malaysia
- Key people: Ismail Omar (Chairman); Abdul Jalil Abdul Hamid (CEO & Group managing editor)
- Parent: Media Prima
- Website: www.nstp.com.my

The New Straits Times Press (Malaysia) Berhad (officially abbreviated as NSTP) is a Malaysian newspaper publishing conglomerate, owned by Media Prima. The NSTP publishes several newspapers, including its namesake flagship newspaper as well as Berita Harian and Harian Metro.

== History ==
The New Straits Times Press (initially The [sic] New Straits Times Press Sdn Bhd) was formed by the directors of the Directors of The New Straits Times Press (Malaysia) Berhad, in a desire to meet the reasonable aspirations of Malaysians to have a majority shareholding in the company which produced the largest mass-circulation organ in the territories of East and West Malaysia.

The Malaysian operations of The Straits Times, The Sunday Times, the Malay Mail, the Sunday Mail, Berita Harian and Berita Minggu were transferred to this new company. An agreement was reached in 1972 between the directors of The Straits Times Press Group (a forerunner of SPH Media) and Tengku Razaleigh Hamzah for the disposal of 80 per cent of the stock of The New Straits Times Press (Malaysia) Sdn. Bhd. for the Malaysian interest.

The company joined up with three others to establish Malaysian Newsprint Industries in 1996, with the mill in Mentakab starting production in April 1999.

The NSTP formerly a parent company of Berita Publishing which primarily focused on book and magazine publications. The company owns 100% in its subsidiary before divested it in 2000 to its former editor-in-chief, Abdul Kadir Jasin through his company, Alaf Positif.

On 22 September 2003, both the NSTP and Sistem Televisyen Malaysia Berhad were spun off from Malaysian Resources Corporation Berhad (MRCB), in which the latter had acquired from Renong Berhad in 1993 to form Media Prima Berhad.

The NSTP announced in December 2019 that they will lay off 543 workers while bureaus were reduced into five effective 12 March 2020.

== Branch offices ==
- Kompleks Alor Setar, Alor Setar, Kedah
- Northam Road, George Town, Penang
- Bangunan Seri Kinta, Ipoh, Perak
- Putrajaya
- Kemayan Square, Seremban, Negeri Sembilan
- Taman Melaka Raya, Malacca City, Malacca
- Muar, Johor
- Summit Signature Hotel, Batu Pahat, Johor
- Bandar Baru UDA, Johor Bahru, Johor
- Kuantan, Pahang
- Kuala Terengganu, Terengganu
- Kota Bharu, Kelantan
- Kuching, Sarawak
- Villa Tropicana Commercial Centre, Kota Kinabalu, Sabah

== See also ==
- Singapore Press Holdings
  - SPH Media
- The Utusan Group - NSTP's main competitor
