= Compact (newspaper) =

Broadsheet-quality newspaper printed in a tabloid format

Comparison of some newspaper sizes with metric paper sizes. Approximate nominal dimensions are in millimetres.

A compact newspaper is a broadsheet-quality newspaper printed in a tabloid format, especially one in the United Kingdom. The term as used for this size came into use after The Independent began producing a smaller format edition in 2003 for London's commuters, designed to be easier to read when using mass transit.

Readers from other parts of the country liked the new format, and The Independent introduced it nationally. The Times and The Scotsman copied the format as The Independent increased in sales. The Times and The Scotsman are now printed exclusively in compact format following trial periods during which both broadsheet and compact version were produced simultaneously. The Independent published its last paper edition on 20 March 2016 and now appears online only.

== See also ==
- Berliner (format)
- List of newspapers
- Paper sizes
