= Mass media in Malaysia =

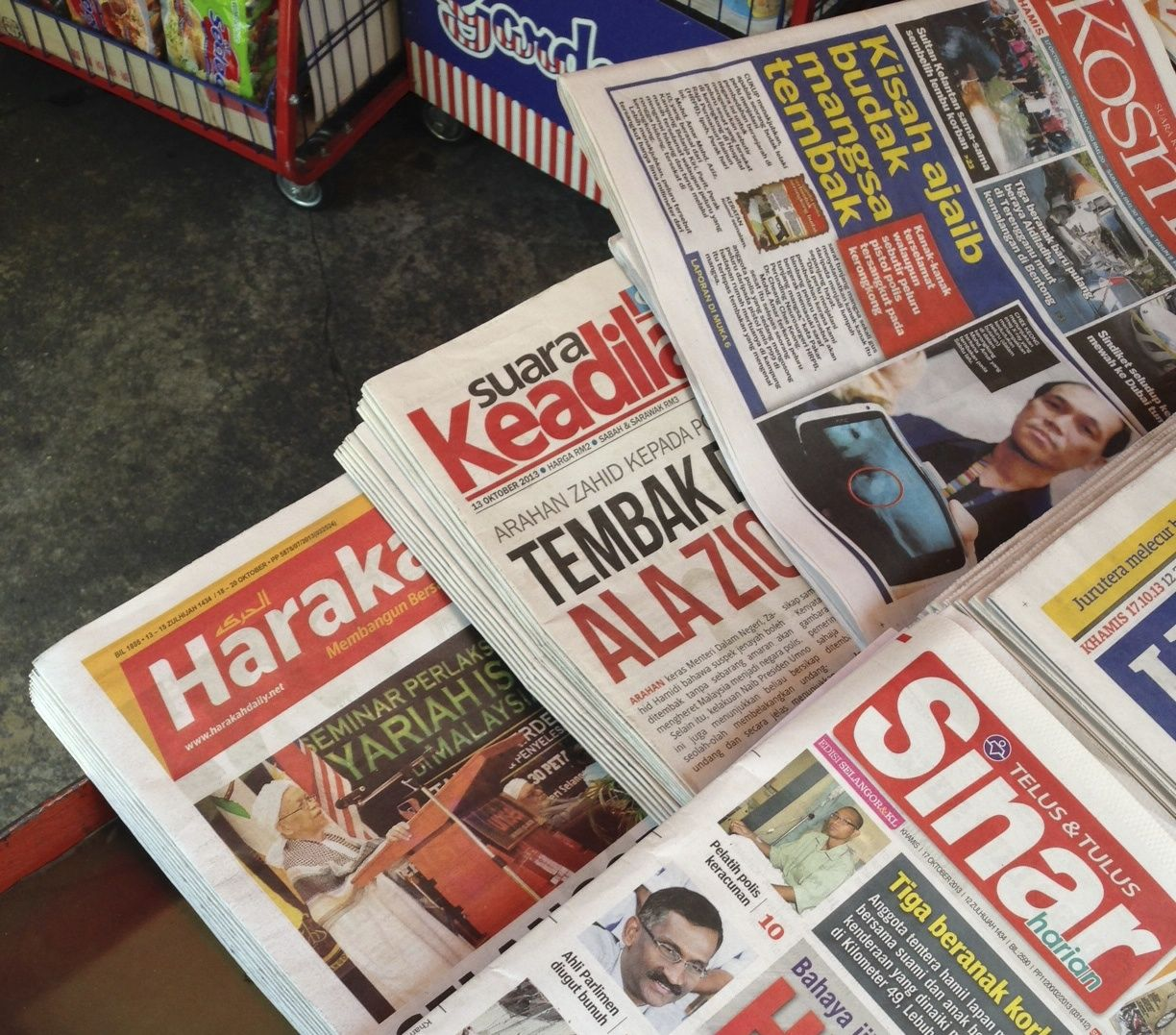
Opposition newspapers with some pro-government newspapers on sale in Kuala Lumpur, from bottom Sinar Harian, Harakah, Suara Keadilan and Kosmo!.

The mass media in Malaysia includes television, radio, newspapers, and web-based media such as bloggers. Many media outlets are either owned directly by the government of Malaysia (e.g. Bernama) or conglomerates connected to component parties of the conservative Barisan Nasional coalition which continuously form the government during Mahathir Mohamad's tenure until May 2018 (e.g. the Media Prima group, which is owned by the United Malays National Organisation): Media Prima owns 2 national Malay-language newspapers, 1 national English newspaper, and almost all private free-to-air television channels, whereas the Media Chinese International Limited owns 4 newspapers covering 82.2% of the entire Malaysian Chinese language newsprint market. Opposition parties during this era like the Islamic Party and People's Justice Party publish their own newspapers, Harakah and Suara Keadilan respectively, which are openly sold alongside regular publications.

Malay language newspapers in Malaysia are often noted by scholars for their lack of analytic critique towards government policies compared to their English counterparts as far back as 1970s; one Utusan Melayu executive even remarked that "it is not the newspapers' role to check on government. The papers here are...supporters of government". Since conventional media is so tightly controlled by the government, Malaysia has a lively alternative media scene, characterised by such news portals as Malaysiakini and The Malaysian Insider which take advantage of the government's pledge not to censor the Internet despite its stranglehold on most mass media outlets.

== Newspapers ==
Malaysian newspapers displayed at a sundry shop.

There are over 30 newspapers and tabloids published mainly in Malay, English, Chinese and Tamil. The most prominent newspapers include The Star, New Straits Times, theSun, Berita Harian, Utusan Malaysia, Malay Mail, Sin Chew Jit Poh and Nanyang Siang Pau.

== Television and radio ==
In 2007, a government agency ordered private television and radio stations to refrain from broadcasting opposition speeches.

State-owned RTM operates seven free-to-air terrestrial local television channels licensed to broadcast in Malaysia, as well as 34 radio channels nationwide. Meanwhile, Media Prima is the parent company of four television channels and five radio channels.

Privately owned by Astro Malaysia Holdings, Astro is Malaysia's current only satellite television provider. There are 200 channels to choose from at a minimum amount of RM 49.95 per month and at a maximum amount of RM 200.00 per month. Astro had 20 radio channels, of which 17 are Astro-branded radio stations, of which nine of them are available via FM radio.

HyppTV by Unifi is one of Malaysia's IPTV provider but to take the TV package, the customer must select at least one internet package, from RM 149 per month to RM 350 per month.

TV Sarawak (TVS) opened in 2020 as Malaysia's first regional TV station (eponymously from Sarawak); albeit not the first in the Sarawak history as back in the April 1998, NTV7 was launched by Sarawakian businessman, Mohd Effendi Norwawi under the entity of Natseven TV Sdn Bhd, before acquired by Media Prima Berhad in 2005. With its own TV station, it will help to counter the problem of state's low priority and under coverage news by Peninsular-based media and increasing the power of East Malaysia representation.

== Freedom ==
The regulated freedom of the press has been criticised. Although critics concede that journalists "probably won't be hauled off and shot" for being critical of the government, it has been claimed that the government creates a chilling effect through threats of reduced employment opportunities and refusing journalists' family members "a place at one of the better public universities". Legislation such as the Printing Presses and Publications Act have also been cited as curtailing freedom of expression.

In 2007, a government agency – the Malaysian Communications and Multimedia Commission – issued a directive to all private television and radio stations to refrain from broadcasting speeches made by opposition leaders. The move was condemned by politicians from the opposition Democratic Action Party. The directive was later withdrawn by the Energy, Water and Communications Ministry.

Malaysia was ranked 141 out of 178 countries in the Press Freedom Index by Reporters Without Borders in 2010 and 122 out of 179 countries in 2012. Malaysia was ranked 119 out of 179 countries in the Press Freedom Index in 2021.

After the 2022 general election, Malaysia jumped 40 places in the World Press Freedom Index to 73rd place in 2023, up from its previous position of 113th in 2022. Meanwhile, the Minister of Communications and Digital, Fahmi Fadzil, announced that the ministry is studying the draft bill for the Malaysia Media Council before presenting it to the Cabinet.

Because of troop sensitivities, newspapers from Singapore cannot be sold in Malaysia, hence The Straits Times and other Singapore titles are not sold in Malaysia, while the New Straits Times and other Malaysian titles are not sold in Singapore. The ban was imposed before the 1 May 1969 general election in Malaysia.

== Issue of fragmentation by language ==
Malaysian Malay language media have been observed as deeply socially conservative in line with views held by their heir broadcasters and publishers' conservative owners, compared to media in other languages: from June to July 2003, Malay-language crime programming denigrating effeminate men and "tough women" on NTV7 was in stark contrast to Chinese language lifestyle programming on the same channel that shone positive light on 6 subject Chinese gays and lesbians.

== Past arrests and investigations ==
Malaysia authorities have arrested, detained and investigated numerous journalists, artists, people and/or groups both online and offline.

Between January 2020 and June 2022, the Malaysian government reported that they conducted 692 investigations under the Communications and Multimedia Act (CMA).

In February 2022, Malaysian police detained activist Fahmi Reza for two days for his artwork on Twitter that satirised a government minister. On July 1, religious authorities and police members charged two people for insulting Islam during their comedy act under the CMA, resulting in local authorities requesting the closure of the comedy club. In October 2022, police detained political activist Jay Jay Denis over a tweet accusing a political leader of misconduct.

PEN International officially denounced the increased use of Section 223 of the CMA to target writers and the general public for expressing their views online and in the press. Freedom of expression is pledged in Article 10 of the Federal Constitution, however Section 223(a) deems it an offence for any individual to use a platform to create, solicit or initiate communication seen as "obscene, indecent, false, menacing or offensive with the intent to annoy, abuse, threaten or harass another person". If charged, individuals can be fined up to RM50,000 or one years' imprisonment.

Article 19, an organisation that calls for freedom of worldwide expression, conducted a legal analysis of the 1998 CMA in February of 2017. They concluded that the Act is overly broad, resulting in an increased amount of offences and lacks proper defence against censorship. They also deem the Act as unprotected of journalistic sources and anonymity. Article 19 calls for the Malaysian government to review the Act and amend it to fit with the standards of international freedoms of expression.
