= Utusan Malaysia =

Malaysian daily Malay language newspaper

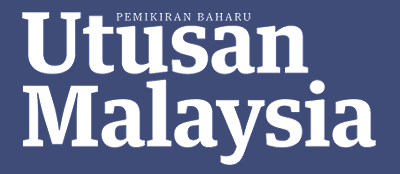

- Front page on 20 July 2020.
- Type: Daily newspaper
- Format: Broadsheet (former); Tabloid (current)
- Owners: The Utusan Group (1939–2019); Media Mulia (2020–present)
- Founder: Yusof Ishak
- Publisher: Mohamad Azlan Jaafar
- Editor: Aznan Bakar
- Deputy editor: Ismail Daud
- News editor: Muhammad Nizam Abdul Hamid; Teon Ng; Shariza Abdullah; Mohd. Radzi Mohd. Zain; Adlinahani Khalil; Imran Mohamad Nor; Yulpisman Asli; Zabry Mohd. Mazlan
- Founded: 29 May 1939; 87 years ago (as Utusan Melayu) in Singapore
- Political alignment: United Malays National Organisation (UMNO) - formerly
- Language: Malay (primary) and English (secondary)
- Headquarters: No. 64, Queen Street and No. 185, Cecil Street, Singapore (former HQ); No. 44, Jalan Utusan, Off Jalan Chan Sow Lin, 55200 Kuala Lumpur, Malaysia (former HQ); Level 4 (East) & Level 5 Quattro West, 4, Persiaran Barat, 46200 Petaling Jaya, Selangor (current HQ, since 2020)
- Country: Malaysia; Singapore (former)
- Circulation: 154,776 (daily); 336,233 (Mingguan Malaysia); 4,084 (daily E-paper); 4,035 (Mingguan Malaysia E-paper)
- OCLC number: 9786722
- Website: www.utusan.com.my
- Free online archives: ww1.utusan.com.my/utusan/search.asp

Utusan Malaysia (Jawi: اوتوسن مليسيا, lit. 'The Malaysian Messenger'; often shortened to simply Utusan 'The Messenger') is a Malaysian Malay language daily newspaper headquartered outside Kuala Lumpur. Formerly owned by the Utusan Group, the newspaper is currently owned by Media Mulia.

Distinctive for its blue masthead as its logo and trademark, Utusan Malaysia is the oldest surviving Malay-language newspaper in Malaysia. It was first published in Jawi in 1939 and became an influential medium for people to voice their opinions against British colonial rule in Malaya. In 2018, the newspaper shifted its size from broadsheet to a tabloid format.

In recent years, Utusan Malaysia went through a critical business period as its daily circulation and readership continued to decline, along with the deteriorating cash flow of its former parent company. Despite initial reports that the newspaper, its Sunday edition Mingguan Malaysia ('The Malaysian Weekly'), and its sister papers Kosmo! and Kosmo! Ahad would be shutting down in mid-August 2019, the newspaper's publisher Utusan Group announced that they would continue publishing after receiving a RM$1.6 million cash injection from the United Malays National Organisation (UMNO).

Though Utusan ceased operations on 9 October 2019, it was subsequently reported that the newspaper would resume publication on 1 November 2019 after Syed Mokhtar Al-Bukhary's Aurora Mulia acquired a majority stake in Utusan's wholly owned subsidiary Dilof Sdn Bhd. However, the anticipated publication did not materialise. In response to the closure of the newspaper, the Minister of Entrepreneur Development, Redzuan Yusof, announced that Utusan Malaysia would come back in 2020 and it formally relaunched on 20 July.

== History ==
Utusan Malaysia was first published as Utusan Melayu in 1939, with its address at Queen Street, Singapore. It was founded by Malay Union member and businessman Ambo Sooloh plus journalists Yusof Ishak and Abdul Rahim Kajai as a dedicated print owned by native Malayan Malays back when the Malay-language newspaper industry was dominated by Jawi Peranakans and Arabs (like the Alsagoffs). It temporarily suspended publication during the Japanese occupation of Malaya and Singapore, where it was merged with Warta Malaya to form Berita Malai. The newspaper moved its headquarters to Cecil Street, Singapore in 1945, and in 1959 relocated to Kuala Lumpur.

On 20 July 1961, all 115 editorial staff conducted a strike in protest of the appointment of former UMNO Informations Chief Ibrahim Fikri as Utusan's new editor-in-chief replacing the incumbent Sa'ad Zahari under fears that the former would sway their editorial stance to favour his party and its Alliance coalition as a whole.

=== 1961: Rebranding ===
The paper was rebranded as Utusan Malaysia started publication on 1 September 1967, being a romanised version for Utusan Melayu and daily edition of Mingguan Malaysia. Mingguan Malaysia published 3 years earlier, on 30 August 1964.

In 1997, the Group made its entry into the world of multimedia with the launch of Utusan Malaysia Online (or Utusan Online for short), Malaysia's first online newspaper in full text and visuals. The service provided, in collaboration with Telekom Malaysia, enables pay-subscribers to read exact replicas of the Group's newspapers, including Utusan Malaysia. On 2 July 2001, Utusan Education Portal (Portal Pendidikan Utusan) was launched. The free service has received recognition from MIMOS (the Malaysian Institute of Microelectronic Systems) as one of the top five education websites in Malaysia in 2001.

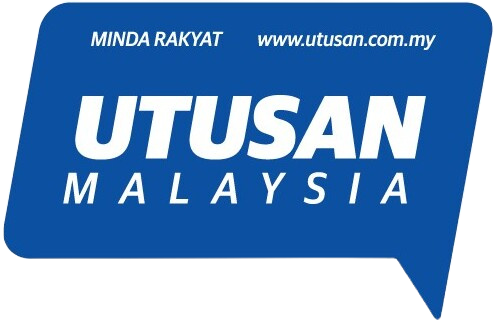
Eleventh logo of Utusan Malaysia, used from 16 September 2018 until 9 October 2019.

On September 16, 2018, to coincide with the 55th anniversary of Malaysia's formation, Utusan Malaysia and its Sunday edition Mingguan Malaysia shifted from broadsheet to tabloid format. Utusan reportedly said the change in size was part of their effort to fulfil the needs and taste of their readers.

On February 8, 2019, Utusan is no longer under direct ownership by UMNO after 31.6 per cent stake of its parent company was acquired by Abd Aziz Sheikh Fadzir.

=== 2019: Closure ===
On 19 August 2019, the Utusan Group announced that Utusan Malaysia, its Sunday paper Mingguan Malaysia, and its sister papers Kosmo! and Kosmo! Ahad would cease their print editions on 21 August 2019 due to the company's financial woes and bankruptcy. Utusan Malaysia will continue its online operations. The decline of Utusan Malaysia's readership and poor financial performance has been attributed by some to its pro-Barisan Nasional and Malay nationalist standpoint. Despite initial reports that the Utusan Malaysia would be shutting down, the Utusan Group reversed their decision after receiving a RM1.6 million cash injection from the United Malays National Organisation. To cover costs, the newspaper's price will be raised by 50 sen to RM 1.50 and Mingguan Malaysia's price would be raised to RM 2.00 beginning 23 August 2019.

Despite financial injection, Utusan Malaysia and its sister papers continued to suffer losses and mounting debt from decreasing circulations, and it finally shuttered on 9 October 2019. On 10 October 2019, it was reported that the Utusan Group's newspapers would resume publication on 1 November 2019; however, the anticipated publication did not take place. Aurora Mulia, a company linked to business tycoon Syed Mokhtar Al-Bukhary which also hold a stake in Media Prima, had reportedly acquired a 70% stake in Utusan's wholly owned subsidiary Dilof Sdn Bhd. However, only some of Utusan's 862 retrenched employees would be re-hired by the new management.

=== Since 2020: Revival ===
In January 2020, it was reported that Utusan Malaysia, along with its sister newspaper, Kosmo! is set to be revived soon, as some sources in the industry confirmed that the newspaper's new management had begun recruiting staff to start working in February. The newspaper was initially expected to be relaunched in April 2020, but it did not take place.

Utusan, together with Kosmo! was expected to be relaunched in July 2020. According to their website, an animated teaser, which was written in Malay, showed: "Nantikan Julai ini. Dibawakan oleh Media Mulia Sdn Bhd." ("Awaiting this July. Brought to you by Media Mulia Sdn Bhd,"). It is understood that the new headquarters of the publication will be based at the New Straits Times Press main office at Jalan Riong, Bangsar. On July 6, it was reported that the newspaper's relaunch is expected to take place on July 20, and the newspaper was relaunched on July 20 with the front-page headline "Bangkit Semula", or 'Rise Again'.

== Headquarters ==
The newspaper's first building was located at Queen Street, Singapore in 1939. In 1958, it moved to Kuala Lumpur.

A new seven-storey high office building was erected in 2010, opposite the existing headquarters. It was built on the former site of a car park for its staff. The official move to the new Utusan Group premises took place in 2013.

In July 2020, it has been reported that Utusan Malaysia, with several other newspapers, namely Berita Harian, Harian Metro, the New Straits Times (NST) and The Malaysian Reserve, will relocate its headquarters from Kuala Lumpur to Shah Alam, Selangor by the end of 2020 or mid-2021. The relocation was made as part of Media Prima's recovery plan to overcome financial crisis.

== Format ==
With its distinctive blue masthead as its logo and trademark, Utusan Malaysia had over 32 pages of news and current affairs, with regular supplements, focusing on diverse topics as entertainment, fashion, music, health, technology, and politics. It was Malaysia's only broadsheet newspaper in a national language until 16 September 2018, when it switched to the tabloid newspaper format.

Mingguan Malaysia, Utusan's weekend edition, had a red masthead. Sections such as Pancawarna and Pancaindera (entertainment section) are published in tabloid size, rather than broadsheet.

== Circulation ==
Utusan Malaysia's circulation peaked at 350,000 copies a day in the 1990s and was one of the top selling newspapers in Malaysia. Circulation had declined by about 250,000 in 2004 and further down to 144,438 copies in first half of 2016. Mingguan Malaysia, the Sunday edition of Utusan Malaysia, had a circulation of 313,495 on first half of 2016, which made it the most popular Malay language newspaper.

== Achievements ==
Date	Achievement
9 February 1965	Utusan's headquarters new extra building in Jalan Chan Sow Lin opened by Tunku Abdul Rahman, Malaysia's first prime minister.
22 June 1972	Malaysia's second prime minister, Abdul Razak Hussein, opened an extra block of new offices in Utusan's headquarters in Jalan Chan Sow Lin.
5 December 1988	Launch of World Sepak Takraw Championships organised with RTM and Malaysia Airlines, to promote sepak takraw alongside other popular sports.
21 May 1989	Utusan's Mini-Marathon organised to celebrate 50th anniversary of this newspaper has been followed by 11,000 participant, with that recorded the highest number of participants ever found in any marathon in the country.
2 May 1991	The opening of Utusan's printing plant in Gong Badak was officiated by Sultan Mahmud Al-Muktafi Billah Shah, the Sultan of Trengganu Darul Iman.
17 January 1996	Utusan Malaysia became the first Malaysian newspaper with full visuals and text to get onto the Information Superhighway when it launched "Utusan Malaysia On-Line" in four languages. Utusan Express, the electronic newspaper in English, was launched on 19 September 1996.
23 May 1997	Utusan is the first media group to organise an expedition that garnered the country global recognition. In true spirit of Malaysia Boleh, "The Project Malaysia - Everest 97", which was in collaboration with the Ministry of Youth & Sports, has made it possible for Malaysians to conquer the world's highest mountain.
8 November 2007	During the Deepavali celebrations in Malaysia, Utusan sold about 370,586 copies, and Kosmo! sold about 162,935 copies. Only three newspapers were published, including Chinese-language newspaper, Oriental Daily News.

== Political positions ==
A share majority in Utusan Malaysia's publisher is directly held by members of the conservative and right wing United Malays National Organisation (UMNO) until its bankruptcy in 2019. Its editorials during the 2013 and 2018 general elections often stoked fears of an alternative rule by UMNO's oppositional parties will cause "Zionism will be established, as it is on the agenda to convert Muslims with their liberalism-pluralism understanding of religion" (see Islam in Malaysia) as well as a supposed backsliding in the economy.

As early as the 1970s, writings on topics concerning women were centred while at the same time, the paper's women journalists were paradoxically seen in a negative light by competing rival men journalists, as was in American newspapers.

== Criticism ==
=== Malay supremacism ===
Utusan frequently stoked racist sentiments with provocative headlines defending the New Economic Policy as well as the maintaining of Malay majoritarian political hegemony in Malaysia or Ketuanan Melayu.

Just one day after the 2013 general elections, in which the ruling Barisan Nasional coalition suffered what was until then its worst-ever results, Utusan published a highly racist feature article with the headline "Apa lagi Cina mahu?" ("What else do the Chinese want?") accusing Chinese Malaysians of trying to overthrow the Malay-dominated government and labelling them "ungrateful". Third-party analysts have noted that the massive electoral swing could be attributed to urban votes of all races deserting the ruling coalition wholesale, rather than pinpointed to any particular race. Despite Prime Minister Najib Razak's defence of the newspaper, Utusan earned widespread condemnation from Malaysians for its unapologetic race-baiting.

In view of Utusan's extreme racist rhetoric, the former Opposition-led Perak state government staged a boycott against the newspaper, with other Opposition states following suit. A motion was also set by the Selangor state government to boycott Utusan while all Selangor state agencies and departments were told to refrain from buying and advertising in the newspaper, in a move to protest a short story titled "Politik Baru YB J" by columnist Datuk Chamil Wariya that appeared in the paper which mentioned the assassination of a fictional character resembling Democratic Action Party assemblywoman Teresa Kok.

Statements by Chief Ministers in then Opposition-held states were out of context, manipulated, or otherwise downright fabricated.

In January 2011, the newspaper suspended a senior journalist, Hata Wahari, president of the National Union of Journalists, after alleging that Hata had brought the newspaper into disrepute and "insulted" its management. Hata was later dismissed from the Utusan group in May of that year. On 20 May 2013, Hata staged a one-man protest in front of the Utusan Melayu headquarters, calling for an end to "irresponsible journalism" and "racist reporting". He was consequently jeered and labelled a "communist" by the Utusan staff gathered there, who also hurled two packets of fried bihun at him.

=== Accusations of propaganda ===
The newspaper has been accused as being a propaganda mouthpiece of the United Malays National Organisation (UMNO) government as well as inciting racial hatred in its articles against the non-Malays of the country. The widely perceived view by most Malaysians that Utusan Malaysia was nothing more than a propaganda newsletter for the ruling government was given much greater credence after its deputy chief editor Zaini Hassan openly stated in a forum organised by the National Civics Bureau that it was acceptable for Utusan to "spin facts" to be "biased in our [the BN Government's] favour". The Malaysiakini reporter covering the forum was later barred from attending.

=== Fake news ===
Utusan offered an apology after running news of an 87-year-old Catholic missionary in Java who purportedly converted to Islam after recovering from a coma. It later turned out that the article was sourced from a fictional news story on a satirical website, the World News Daily Report.

== Lawsuits ==
Numerous lawsuits were filed against Utusan by several personalities from the former Pakatan Rakyat coalition. Notably, Penang Chief Minister Lim Guan Eng successfully sued for libel twice against the paper, winning RM400,000 in accumulated damages for both lawsuits.

On 14 December 2012, Karpal Singh was awarded RM50,000 in damages after a High Court judge declared that an Utusan article painting him as anti-Islam was "by all accounts mischievous".

On 21 January 2013, the High Court awarded Anwar Ibrahim RM45,000 in damages after a series of Utusan articles deliberately misrepresented his statement in a BBC interview so as to suggest that the opposition leader was pro-LGBT (a controversial stance in Muslim-majority Malaysia). The paper's lawyer triggered significant uproar during proceedings when he argued that newspapers did not have the "luxury of time" to ascertain the truth of their reports.

On 30 March 2016, celebrity and infotainer AC Mizal filed a lawsuit against Utusan for the paper's article entitled 'Peace Yall FM tak bayar gaji' ("Peace Yall FM doesn't pay salaries") which pointing his company for their irresponsibility to their workers. In November, the lawsuit failed to be resolved.

== Awards and recognition ==
Utusan won the "IFRA Publish Asia 2003 Award" for the "Best in Print" category on 20 March 2002. It was the first international-level award to be won by the newspaper.

In 2014, it won two awards in Johor Media Awards 2014.

== See also ==
- Other Malaysian Malay language newspapers:
  - Berita Harian
  - Harian Metro
  - Kosmo!
  - Utusan Borneo, a newspaper publication for the state of Sabah and Sarawak
  - Sinar Harian
