= Deknong Kemalawati =

Indonesian poet

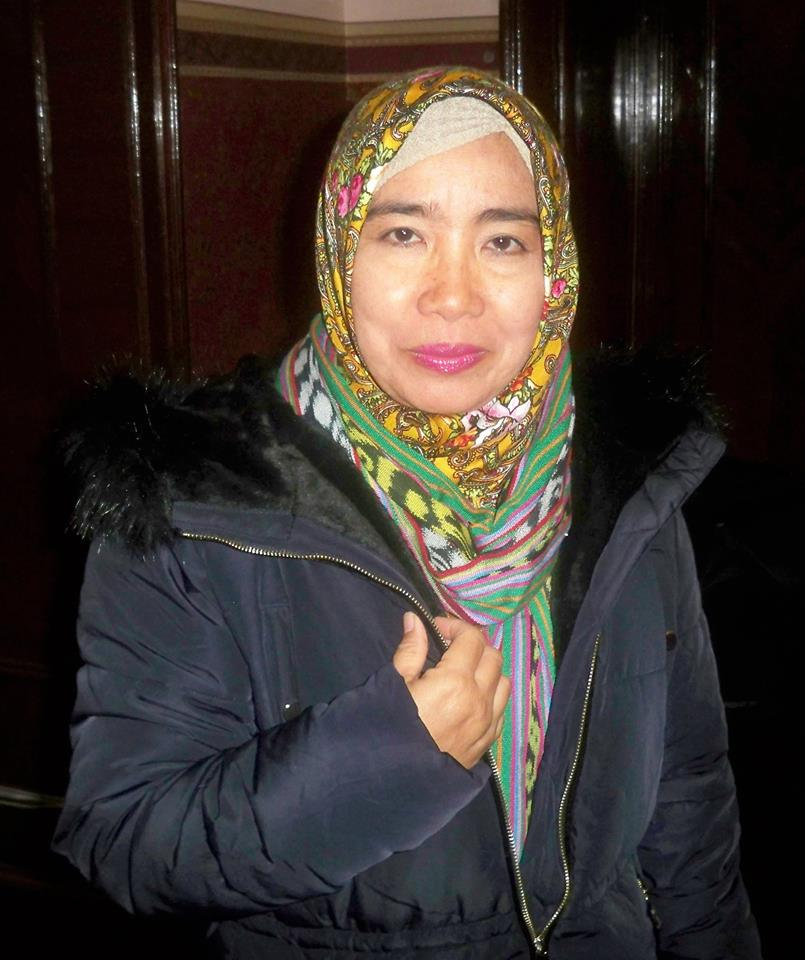
- Kemalawati in 2017
- Born: Deknong Kemalawati; 2 April 1965 (age 61); Meulaboh, Aceh, Indonesia
- Education: Syiah Kuala University
- Occupation: Poet
- Writing career
- Pen name: D Kemalawati
- Language: Indonesian
- Years active: (2000–present)
- Genre: Poetry
- Notable awards: Literary Prize of the Government of Aceh (2007); The Banda Aceh Award for Contribution to the Development of Culture (2018)

Deknong Kemalawati (born 2 April 1965) is an Indonesian poet. She is one of the leading poets of modern Indonesia, chairman of the Art Council Banda Aceh, and winner of the Literary Prize of the Government of Aceh.

== Brief biography ==
Deknong Kemalawati was born on 2 April 1965, in Meulaboh, Aceh. She graduated from the Pedagogical Faculty of Syiah Kuala University, and worked as a mathematics teacher in high school. She is one of the founders of the Institute of Culture and Society (Lapena) (1998), and Chairman of the Art Council of Banda Aceh. She used to take part in the poetry workshops organized by Dimas Arika Mihardja.

== Creativity ==
Kemalawati writes poetry from the school bench. The first publications were published in newspapers and magazines during the student's period. The first author's collection "Letter from a no-man country" was published in 2006. The novel Seoulusah about the events of the 2004 Indian Ocean earthquake and tsunami was published in 2007 and received good reviews from critics. To date, on the poet's account are more than ten collections of poems, including some in collaboration with other poets.

In addition to literary activity, he takes part in theatrical productions and performances of national dances. In November 2012, she successfully participated in the Days of Indonesian Poetry (Pekan Baru). In October 27–28, 2017, she visited Kazan as part of the Aceh cultural group, where she recited her poems and represented the national dances. Many times she represented Indonesia in international forums: in 2016 in Kuala Lumpur on the World Poetry Readings of the Great Malay Nusantara organization (Numera) and the meeting of Nusantara poets, and in 2018 in Sabah during the discussion of the Indonesian and Malaysian poets on the role of poetry in the development of bilateral relations.

== Awards ==
- Literary Prize of the Government of Aceh (2007).
- The Banda Aceh Award for Contribution to the Development of Culture (2018).
- Incentive prize at the ASEAN poetic competition (Lomba Menulis Puisi Asean) (2019, poem “Woman in Captivity”)

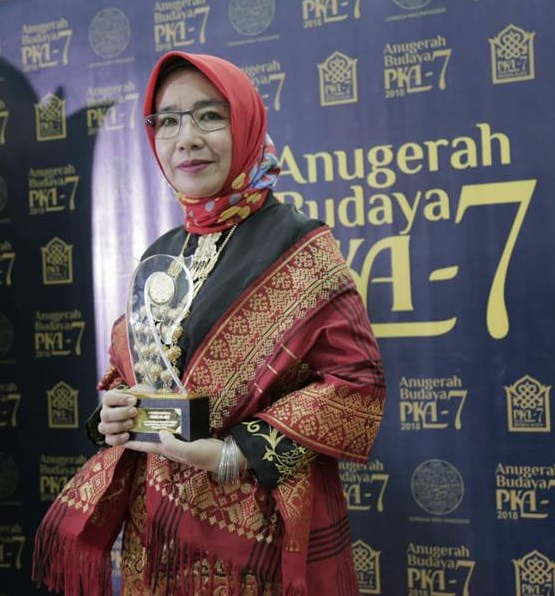
Kemalawati at the Banda Aceh Cultural Prize Award Ceremony (2018)

== Impression ==
... The sincere voice of D. Kemalavati, coming from the bottom of her heart, is heard in the sounds of rebana as the unfading syair Teungku Sik Pante Kullu from Hikayat about the holy war. In the poems of D. Kemalavati we see the beautiful face of her homeland, the long-suffering Aceh ... Metaphors, diction, imbued with symbolism, leave in our souls the trace that makes us love the beauty ... Her poems are an integral part of Nusantara poetry and the whole world. - Ahmad Kamal Abdullah, Malaysian National Laureate, S.E.A. Write Award Laureate

== Main works ==
- (ed.) Ziarah Ombak (Pilgrimage of the Wave). Bandar Aceh: Lapena 2005.
- (ed.) Selayang Pandang Sastrawan Aceh (Briefly about the writers of Aceh). Bandar Aceh: Lapena, 2006.
- (ed.) Wanita dan Islam (Woman and Islam). Bandar Aceh: Lapena 2006.
- Surat Dari Negeri Tak Bertuan (Letter from a no-man's country). Bandar Aceh: Lapena, 2006) (poems).
- Pembelaan Seorang Guru (In Defense of Teachers). Bandar Aceh: Lapena, 2007 (essay).
- Seulusoh. Bandar Aceh: Lapena, 2007 (novel).
- Antologi De Poeticas, Kumpulan puisi Indonesia, Portugal, Malaysia (Poetic Anthology: Indonesia, Portugal, Malaysia). Jakarta: Gramedia, 2008 (poems, together with others)
- 3 Di Hati (Three in the Heart). Bandar Aceh: Lapena, 2010 (poems, together with Diah Hadaning, Dimas Arika Mihardja).
- Hujan Selepas Bara (Rain after the heat). Bandar Aceh: Lapena, 2012 (poems).
- Syair Persahabatan Dua Bangsa (Poems of Friendship of Two Nations). Bandung, 2015 (together with others)
- Bayang Ibu (Mother's shadow). Bandar Aceh: Lapen, 2016 (poems).
- Pasie Karang. Antologi Puisi. Temu Penyair Nusantara pada Pekan Kebudayaan Aceh Barat 2016. Kurator D Kemalawati, Fikar W. Eda, Mustafa Ismail. Disusun Teuku Dadek. Editor Tamu Hermansyah. Meulaboh, 2016 ( Pasie Karang. Poetry anthology. Meeting of Nusantara Poets at West Aceh Cultural Week 2016. Kurator D Kemalawati, Fikar W. Eda, Mustafa Ismail. Compiled by Teuku Dadek. Guest Editor Hermansyah. Meulaboh, 2016 ISBN 978-602-74361-2-1
- Ketika Hitam Dikatakan Putih dan Sajak Tetap Bersuara: SAJAK-SAJAK MALAYSIA-Indonesia (When black is called white and Poetry still talks: Poems of poets of Malaysia and Indonesia). Compiled by Raja Ahmad Aminullah. Jakarta: Yayasan Obor Indonesia, 2017 (poems; together with others)
- Bungakupula. Kumpulan Puisi Tiga Penyair Perempuan Aceh. Editor Mahwi Air Tawar. Banda Aceh: Lapena, 2018 (together with others) ISBN 978-602-52494-0-2
- Menembus Arus Menyelami Aceh. Puisi-Puisi Perdamaian 9 Negara. Kurator: Maman S. Mahayana, Helmi Haas, D. Kemalawati, Sulaiman Tripa, Mahwi Air Tawar. Banda Aceh: Lapena, 2018 (together with others) ISBN 978-602-50497-9-8

== Family ==
Kemalawait married lawyer Helmy Hass in 1992. She has two sons and a daughter.
