= Sakmara =

Sakmara may refer to:

- Sakmara (river), a river in the Ural Mountains, Russia
- Sakmara (rural locality), a rural locality (a selo) in Sakmarsky District of Orenburg Oblast, Russia
