= Udo Z. Karzi =

Indonesian writer (born 1970)

Udo Z. Karzi (born June 12, 1970, in Liwa, Lampung) is an Indonesian writer.

== Education ==
He graduated from the Department of Government Science at the Faculty of Social Sciences and Political Science (FISIP) of Lampung University in 1996.

== Journalism ==
He was the chief editor of student newspaper Teknokra (1993-1994), the general leader of the magazine Republica (1994-1996), and advisor to the magazine Ijtihad (1995-1998).

He has been a member and administrator of the Alliance of Independent Journalists (AJI) in Lampung since its establishment on March 31, 2001.

He became a freelance reporter for the Lampung Post, Bandar Lampung (1995-1996), and a reporter for the weekly news magazine Sinar in Jakarta (1997-1998).

He worked as a lecturer in economics and accounting at a senior high school in his hometown (1998) before returning to journalism in roles at the Sumatera Post, Bandar Lampung (1998-2000), Lampung Post, Bandar Lampung (2000-2006), Borneo News, Pangkalan Bun (2006-2008), back to Lampung Post (2009-2015), and since 2015 at the newspaper Fajar Sumatera, Bandar Lampung.

== Cultural work ==
He was chairman of the board of research and development of Lampung Art Council (R & D DKL) (2005-2006). In 2010, with Y. Wibowo and Nugroho Este, he established the publisher Pustaka Labrak, as well as being the editor at BE Press, Bandar Lampung (since 2007).

== Awards ==
- His book of poetry, Mak Dawah Mak Dibingi (BE Press, 2007) won the 2008 Rancage Literary Award for Lampung literature.
- Won the 2014 Kamaroeddin Award from Alliance of Independent Journalists (AJI) Bandar Lampung
- His novel, Negarabatin (Pustaka LaBRAK, 2016) won the 2017 Rancage Literary Award for Lampung literature.
- His collection of short stories, Minan Lela Sebambangan (Pustaka LaBRAK, 2024) won the 2025 Rancage Literary Award

== Selected publications ==
- Etos Kita: Moralitas Kaum Intelektual (editor, Teknokra & Gama Media, 2002)
- Teknokra: Jejak Langkah Pers Mahasiswa (editor with Budisantoso Budiman, Teknokra-Pustaka LaBRAK, 2010)
- Mamak Kenut: Orang Lampung Punya Celoteh (Indepth Publishing, 2012),
- Feodalisme Modern: Wacana Kritis tentang Lampung dan Kelampungan (Indepth Publishing, 2013).
- Tumi Mit Kota (with Elly Dharmawanti, Pustaka Labrak, 2013),
- Dari Oedin ke Ridho: Kado 100 Hari Pemerintah M Ridho Ficardo-Bachtiar Basri (editor, Indepth Publishing, 2014)
- Menulis Asyik (Sai Wawai Publishing, 2014)
- Rumah Berwarna Kunyit (editor, Pustaka LaBRAK & Aura Publishing, 2015)
- Ke Negarabatin Mamak Kenut Kembali (Pustaka LaBRAK, 2016)
- Ngupi Pai: Sesobek Kecil Ulun Lampung (Pustaka LaBRAK, 2019)
- Lunik-Lunik Cabi Lunik: Cerita-Cerita Buntak Gawoh (Pustaka LaBRAK, 2019)
- Setiwang (pooms, Pustaka LaBRAK, 2020)
- Jejak-jejak Literer: Bibliografi Sastra Lampung (1960-2020) (Pustaka LaBRAK, 2021)
- Negarabatin, Negeri di Balik Bukit (novel, Pustaka Jaya, 2022)
- Yang (A)gak Serius dan yang Lucu-lucu tentang Jurnalisme, Sastra, Jurnalisme (Pustaka LaBRAK, 2023)
- Pepatah-Petitih Orang Lampung (disusun bersama Iwan Nurdaya-Djafar, 2023)
- Surat Cinta untuk Pithagiras yang Lupa Ditulis (novel, Pustaka LaBRAK, 2024)
- Kesibukan Membuat Sejarah (kumpulan sajak, 2025)

== Studies of his work ==
- Kuswinarto. Udo Z. Karzi dalam Peta Puisi (Berbahasa) Lampung. (2003)
- Ritanti Aji Cahyaningrum. Zulkarnain Zubairi dan Kelampungannya. (2006)
- Melsa Hendralia. Analisis Nilai-nilai Budaya Lampung dalam Kumpulan Sajak Mak Dawah Mak Dibingi karya Udo Z. Karzi dan Implikasinya dalam Pembelajaran di Sekolah Menengah Atas. (thesis STKIP Muhammadiyah Kotabumi Lampung, 2010)
- Arman AZ, Ed. Mencari Lampung dalam Senyapnya Jalan Budaya: Kado 50 Tahun Udo Z Karzi. Bandar Lampung: Pustaka LaBRAK, 2020.
