= Victor A. Pogadaev =

Russian historian and writer (born 1946)

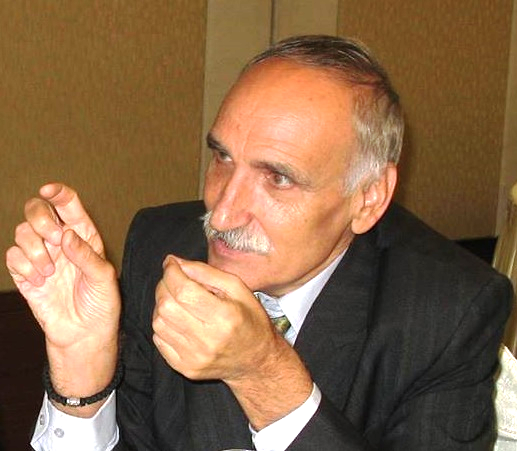
- Born: November 20, 1946 (age 79); Sakmara, Orenburg Oblast, Russian SFSR, Soviet Union
- Resting place: Russian (1991 - present)
- Education: PhD
- Alma mater: Institute of Oriental Languages, Lomonosov Moscow State University
- Occupations: Historian, Lexicographer, Translator

Victor A. Pogadaev (Russian: Виктор А. Погадаев) (born November 20, 1946, in Sakmara, Orenburg Oblast, Russia) is a Russian historian, orientalist, and translator. He specializes in the history and culture of South-East Asia and translates literary works from Malay and Indonesian into Russian and vice versa. He is also a noted lexicographer.

== Biography ==
In 1964 he graduated from Sakmarskaya high school with a gold medal. In 1964–1965 he worked as a teacher of German in Krasnokommunarskaya 8-year school at Sakmarskaya Station. In 1965–1970 years he was a student of Indonesian branch of the Institute of Oriental Languages, Lomonosov Moscow State University, graduating it with excellence. In 1970–1971 was studying Malay at the University of Malaya (Kuala Lumpur) in the first group of Russian students through the student exchange. In 1975 finished post-graduate studies at the Institute of Asian and African Studies of Lomonosov Moscow State University and in 1976 got PhD in History with the theses "Opposition Parties of Malaysia” (1957–1971). In 1977–1982 he worked under the Ministry of Foreign Affairs of the USSR in the Soviet Embassy in Indonesia, in 1986–1989 in the Soviet Embassy in Malaysia. Since 1989 he was an editor- consultant of the sector "Encyclopedia of Asia” at the Institute of Oriental Studies, Russian Academy of Science, in 1996–2001 worked as a lecturer of Indonesian language at the Institute of Asian and African Studies, in 1998–2001 simultaneously as the Deputy Head of Information and Analytical Center of "Evening Moscow" Concern. Since September 2001 – the Lecturer of Russian Language and Russian Culture at the Faculty of Languages and Linguistics, University of Malaya in Kuala Lumpur, Malaysia, since 2003 – Assoc. Professor. Currentle he is a lecturer on Malay and Indonesian at the Moscow State Institute of International Relations (MGIMO) and the Diplpmatic Academy of the Russian Ministry of Foreign Affairs.

In 1998–2001 he was the representative of Russia in «Experpta Indonesica» (Leiden). He is currently a Corresponding Member of International Teacher’s Training Academy of Science (2006), a Vice-President of the Nusantara Society, an expert of ASEAN Centre at Moscow State Institute of International Relations, a member of the Editorial Team of the journal «Folklore and Folkloristics» (India), a member of the Editorial Board of International Review of Humanities Studies (Jakarta), a member of International Advisory Board of International Journal of Islamic Thought (Malaysia, 2020), a life member of the Association of Modern Languages (Malaysia), a member of the International Council on Malay Language (Kuala Lumpur). In 2019-2025 he was a columnist of Malaysia newspaper New Straits Times.

== Main publications ==
title on right with 3.0em padding
- Малайзийско-русско-английский словарь (Malay-Russian-English Dictionary). M.: Russky Yazik, 1977, 400 pp. (in collaboration with N. V. Rott and A. P. Pavlenko).
- (ed). Человек из легенды. К 150-летию со дня рождения Н. Н. Миклухо-Маклая (A Man from the Legend. In Commomoration of the 150th Anniversary of N.N. Miklukho-Maclay). Малайско-индонезийские исследования (Malay-Indonesian Studies) VIII. M.: Krasnaya Gora, 1997, 68 pp.
- (ed). Национальное строительство и литературный/ культурный процесс в Юго-Восточной Азии (National Building and Literary/Cultural Processes in South-East Asia). Малайско — индонезийские исследования (Malay-Indonesian Studies) IX. M.: Krasnaya Gora, 1997, 408 pp.
- (ed.) Малайско-индонезийские исследования (Malay-Indonesian Studies), вып. 12. М.: Muravei-Guide, 1999, 192 pp.
- «Language Situation and Language Policy in Southeast Asia». — Parangalcang Brother Andrew. Festschrift for Andrew Gonzales on His Sixtieth Birthday. Editors: Ma Lourdes S. Bautista, Teodoro A. Liamzon, Bonifacio P. Sibayan. Linguistic Society of the Philippines. Manila, 2000, pp. 213–225. (in collaboration with V. A. Makarenko).
- (trans) Leo Tolstoy. Haji Murat. Kuala Lumpur: DBP, 2001, 242 pp. ISBN 983-62-7205-4
- Penyair Agung Rusia Pushkin dan Dunia Timur (The Great Russian Poet Pushkin and the Oriental World). Monograph Series. Centre For Civilisational Dialogue. University Malaya. N 6, 2003, 64 pp. ISBN 983-3070-06-X
- «Russian Chastushka and Malay Pantun».— Folcloristics: In Search of Root. A Felicitation Volume published to Celebrate the 70th Birth Anniversary of Dr. Subhash Chandra Bandopadhyay. Kolkata, 2008, 319—333.
- (trans) Mawar Emas. Bunga Rampai Sastera Rusia (Golden Rose. Anthology of Russian Literature). Penyelenggara dan Penterjemah Victor Pogadaev. Kuala Lumpur: Institut Terjemahan Negara Malaysia, 2009. ISBN 978-983-068-350-8.
- Kamus Rusia-Indonesia, Indonesia-Rusia (Russian-Indonesian, Indonesian-Russian Dictionary). Jakarta: Gramedia Pustaka Utama, 2010, 1324 pp. ISBN 978-979-22-4881-4
- Малайский мир: Бруней, Индонезия, Малайзия, Сингапур. Лингвострановедческий словарь (Malay World: Brunei, Indonesia, Malaysia, Singapore. Lingua-Cultural Dictionary). Свыше 9000 словарных статей. M.: Vostochnaya Kniga, 2012, pp. 798. ISBN 978-5-7873-0658-3
- Малайзийская оппозиция в борьбе за независимость страны и социальныйпрогресс: 1940-1970-е годы (Malaysian Opposition in the Struggle for Independence and Social Progress: Years 1940–1970). M: Klyuch-S, 2014, 160 pp. ISBN 978-5-906751-08-9
- Wajah Sarjana Pengajian Melayu Rusia (Faces of Scholars of Malay Studies in Russia). Kuala Lumpur: DBP, 2015, 174 pp. ISBN 9789834617004.
- Новый малайско-русский и русско-малайский словарь. Факультет языков и лингвистики Университета Малайя. Около 70 000 слов. Консультант — профессор Зурайда Мохд. Дон (A new Malay-Russian, Russian-Malay Dictionary. Faculty of Languages and Linguistics, University of Malaya, about 70 000 words. Consultant Prof. Zuraidah Mohd. Don). М.: Издательство «Ключ-С», 2016, 816 с. ISBN 978-5-906751-42-3.
- Большой малайско-русский словарь (Big Malay-Russian Dictionary). Около 60 тыс. слов. Консультант Асмах Хаджи Омар. M.: Klyuch-S, 2013, 1024 pp. ISBN 978-5-93136-192-5 (in collaboration with T.V. Dorofeeva and E.S. Kukushkina).
- Vseobshie Vibori kak Otrazhenie Borbi za Vlast v Malayzii (General Elections as a Reflection of the Struggle for Power in Malaysia) // Power and Society in Southeast Asia. History and Modernity. Moscow: Lomonosov Moscow State University, 2015, p. 215-232.
- Кристанг-Русский Словарь (Около 4000 слов). Papiah Kristang-Russio Dictionario (Approximo 4000 palabra). M.: Klyuch-S, 2016, 88 pp. ISBN 978-5-906751-70-6 (in collaboration with Joan Margaret Marbeck)
- (ed., trans., preface). В поисках мечты: современная поэзия Индонезии в переводах Виктора Погадаева (In Search of Dreams: Modern Indonesian Poetry in the translation of Victor Pogadaev). M.: Klyuch-S, Jakarta: HW Project, 2016. 96 pp. ISBN 978-5-906751-68-3, ISBN 978-602-14750-7-2
- Cultural Development in South-East Asia: Looking Forward Looking Back // Межцивилизационные контакты в странах Юго-Восточной Азии. Исторические перспективы и глобализация. Сборник статей (Intercivilizational Contacts in the Countries of Southeast Asia. Historical Perspectives and Globalization. Collection of Articles). С-Пб, 2017, с. 141-164.
- Dragons Images in Russian Folklore // Folklore and Folkloristics. Kolkota, Vol. 10:2 December 2017, p. 15-27.
- "Малайзия. Возвращение Махатхира" (Malaysia: The Return of Mahathir) // “Азия и Африка сегодня" (Asia and Africa Today), No. 9, 2018, p. 40-44.
- Russia - Malaysia: Credentials of Literatures (On Mutual Translations and the Impact of Russian Literature) // Malay-Indonesian Studies. Issue XX. Editors V.A. Pogadaev, V.V. Sikorsky. M .: Nusantara Society, Institute of Oriental Studies, Russian Academy of Sciences, 2018, p. 83-105.
- Погадаев В.А. Творческие поиски Анвара Ридвана //Малайско-индонезийские исследования. Выпуск XXI. К 80-летию А.К. Оглоблина. Редакторы-составители В.В. Сикорский, В.А. Погадаев. М.: Общество "Нусантара", 2019, с. 137-142 (Pogadaev V.A. Creative Searching of Anwar Ridhwan // Malay-Indonesian Studies. Issue XXI. Festschrift inHonor of Prof. Alexander K. Ogloblin on the Occasion of his 80th Birthday. Editors-compilers V.V. Sikorsky, V.A. Pogadaev. M.: Nusantara Society, 2019, p. 137-142).

== Awards and honours ==
- Sumbangsih (Prize) Prima Comexindo (1998, Indonesia-Rusia)
- Diploma of Honour by the Russian Ministry of Foreign Affairs for contribution to development of cultural relations between Russia and Malaysia (2005)
- Two bronze medals at the Expo of Research, Invention and Innovation (2007, Malaysia)
- International Prize Numera’s Man of Letters (Malaysia, 2013)
- Diploma of Honour by the Federal Agency for the Commonwealth of Independent States, Compatriots Living Abroad and International Humanitarian Cooperation (Rossotrudnichestvo) (2014)
- Literary Award 2017 by A Poetry Initiative of Bangladesh (Kathak) "In Appreciation of Outstanding Contribution, Initiative and Deep Commitment to National and World literature" (3.2.2017)
- Honorary Diploma of the Nicholas Roerich International Prize 2018 in the nomination "Formation of the cultural image of the country in the world"
- Certificate of thanks and appreciation "For Contribution to the Development of the Russian State Library" by the Director General of the Library V.V. Duda (September 12, 2019)
- Letter of thanks from the head of the Rossotrudnichestvo representative office in Malaysia for the translation of Malay literature into Russian (2019);
- Commemorative medal of the Ministry of Culture of the Russian Federation "The Great Russian Writer F. M. Dostoevsky (1821-2021)" (2021);
- Medal "Person prominent in cultural matters" of the Eurasian Cultural Foundation of the Republic of Kazakhstan (2022).
- Certificate of honor from the Prime Minister of Malaysia Ismail Sabri Yaakob for the presentation of a report at the International Symposium on the Malay Language in Kuala Lumpur (22-24 May 2022);
- Award for Service to Literature by National Federation of Malaysian Writers' Unions (GAPENA) (2023).
- Honorary Medal "For Contribution to Russian Culture through Online Publications" from the literary magazine "Russian Binding" (2024).
- Letter of gratitude from the Ambassador of Russia to Malaysia N. M. Latypov "For Success in the Long-Term and Fruitful Promotion of Intercultural and Intercivilizational Dialogue between Russia and Malaysia" (2026).

== Bibliography ==
- Pogadaev Viktor Aleksandrovič. - Biographischer Index Rußlands und der Sowjetunion / Biographical Index of Russia and the Soviet Union. Compiled by Axel Frey. München: Walter de Gruyter, 2005, p. 1624. ISBN 3110933365, 9783110933369
- Pogadaev, Victor Alexandrovich. — Who’s Who in the World 2010. 27th Edition. New Providence, NJ: Marquis Who’Who, p. 2156.
- Pogadaev, Dr. V. - Guide to Asian Studies in Europe. International Institute of Asian Studies (IIAS). Routledge, 2014, p. 79.
