= Lyudmila Khokhlova =

Russian indologist, linguist

- Occupations: Indologist, linguist
- Title: Associate professor
- Awards: Padma Shri (2026)

Academic work
- Discipline: Indology, Historical linguistics
- Sub-discipline: Indo-Aryan languages
- Institutions: Moscow State University
- Main interests: Historical linguistics, Indo-Aryan languages, Sikhism studies

Lyudmila Viktorovna Khokhlova (born 31 October 1945) (Russian: Людмила Викторовна Хохлова) is a Russian indologist and linguist.

== Early life and education ==
Khokhlova was born in Russia on 31 October 1945. She did her Master in Hindi Master’s in Hindi language and literature from Moscow State University in 1970. Later she completed her PhD in Indian linguistics from the Institute of Linguistics at the at the Academy of Sciences, Moscow. Her thesis was a comparative study of Hindi and Rajasthani. She has been working as an associate professor from February 1977 in the Department of Indian Philology at the Institute of Asian and African Studies, Moscow State University. She specialises in historical linguistics and the study of Indo-Aryan languages, including Hindi, Punjabi, Gujarati, and Marwari. She taught Hindi and Punjabi at Moscow State University.

In 2026, she was awarded the Padma Shri by the president of India for her contributions to the study of the origins and evolution of Sikhism. She has 92 academic publications and authored six books.
