= Tatiana Dorofeeva (linguist) =

Russian linguist

Tatiana Valerianovna Dorofeeva
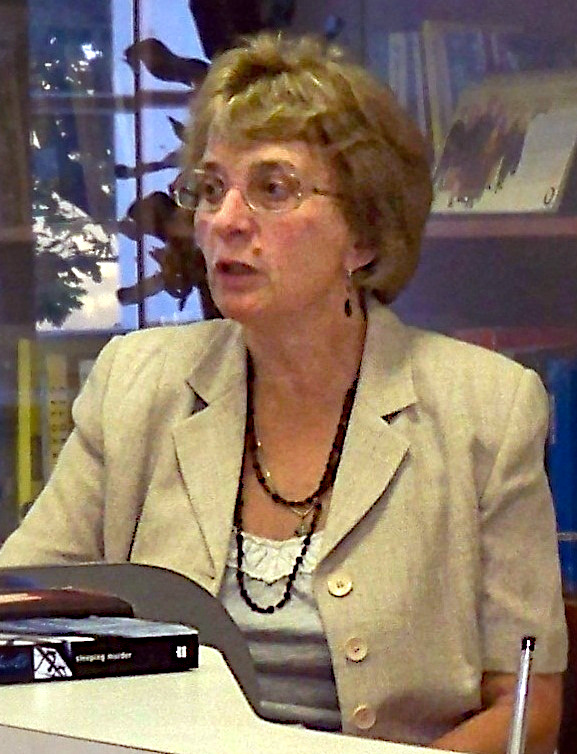
- Tatiana Dorofeeva at the seminar of Nusantara Society, 7.6.2011
- Born: January 25, 1948; Penza, Russian SFSR, Soviet Union
- Died: January 29, 2012 (aged 64); Moscow, Russia
- Occupation: linguist Russian (1991-2012)

Tatiana Valerianovna Dorofeeva (Russian: Татьяна Валериановна Дорофеева; January 25, 1948, Penza – January 29, 2012, Moscow) was a Russian linguist, orientalist and translator.

Graduated from Institute of Oriental Languages (part of Moscow State University) in 1970. In 1972 she started to teach Malay at the Institute of Asian and African Studies.

Tatiana Dorofeeva wrote a number of important works on Malay linguistics. She was a co-author of the textbook of the Malay language (2006) and the Great Malay-Russian Dictionary (2013).

== Selected bibliography ==
Information source – электронный каталог РНБ:

1. Дорофеева Т. В. История письменного малайского языка (VII – начала XX веков). – М.: Гуманитарий, 2001. – 298 с. – ISBN 5-89221-037-5.
2. Индонезийский и малайский мир во втором тысячелетии: основные вехи развития = Indonesian and Malay world in the second millennium: milestones of development: Докл. участников 11-го Европ. коллоквиума по индонез. и малайс. исслед., Москва, 29 июня — 1 июля 1999 г./ Редкол.: Т. В. Дорофеева и др. — М.: Гуманитарий, 2000. — 324 с. — ISBN 5-89221-027-8.
3. Дорофеева Т. В., Кукушкина Е. С. Учебник малайского (малайзийского) языка: Для студентов 1—2 курсов, изучающих малайзийский язык в качестве основного/ МГУ им. М. В. Ломоносова, Ин-т стран Азии и Африки. — Перераб. и доп. ред. «Учебного пособия по малайзийскому языку» (МГУ, 1991). — М.: Академия гуманитарных исследований, 2006. — 383 с. — ISBN 5-98499-070-9.
4. Дорофеева Т. В. Учебное пособие по малайзийскому языку: Для студентов 1-го курса/ МГУ им. М. В. Ломоносова, Ин-т стран Азии и Африки. Каф. филологии Юго-Вост. Азии, Кореи и Монголии. — М.: Изд-во МГУ, 1991. — 270 с. — ISBN 5-211-01884-2.
5. Филиппины в Малайском мире: Сб. ст./ Сост. Б. Б. Парникель; Отв. ред. Т. В. Дорофеева, Б. Б. Парникель. — М.: МЦ РГО, 1994. — 120 с. — (Малайско-индонезийские исследования/ Рос. акад. наук; Рус. геогр. о-во, Моск. центр; Рез. на англ. яз.) — Библиогр. в конце ст.
6. Дорофеева Т. В. Функционирование и развитие малайзийского языка: Автореф. дис. … канд. филол. наук. — М.: Изд-во Моск. ун-та, 1980. — 28 с.
7. Tatiana V. Dorofeeva, Yury A. Lander, ред. Материалы докладов III конференции молодых специалистов «Малайский мир: история, филология, культура». М.: ИВ РАН, 2004.
8. Dorofeeva, Tatiana V. (2011) Bahasa Melayu Seumpama Bahasa Latin di Rantau Nusantara (Малайский — латынь Нусантары). Jurnal Terjemahan Alam & Tamadun Melayu, 2 (2). Bangi: Universiti Kebangsaan Malaysia, pp. 163–171. ISSN 2180-043X
9. Т.В. Дорофеева, Е.С Кукушкина, В.А. Погадаев. Большой малайско-русский словарь. Консультант почётный профессор Дато Доктор Асмах Хаджи Омар. Около 60 тыс. слов. М.: Ключ-С, 2013 ISBN 978-5-93136-192-5
