= Diah Hadaning =

Indonesian writer (1940–2021)

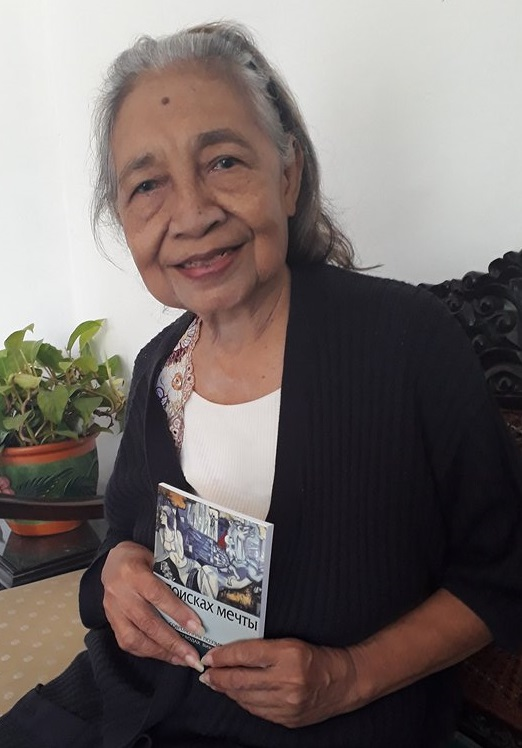
- Diah Hadaning. Jakarta, 2.10.2017
- Born: Diah Hadaning; 4 May 1940 (age 86) (Indonesia) Jepara, Central Java
- Died: 1 August 2021 (Indonesia) Depok, West Java
- Citizenship: Indonesia
- Occupations: poet, writer
- Writing career
- Language: Indonesian
- Years active: 1970-2021
- Genres: poetry, novel, short stories
- Notable awards: The Gapena Award of Malaysia (1980); EBONI Jakarta Award for Contribution to Forest Protection (1993); Award of the Surakarta Cultural Center in Java (2003); Rancage Literary Award (2004)

Diah Hadaning (4 May 1940, Jepara, Central Java — 1 August 2021) was an Indonesian writer. Among friends she is known as Diha.

== Biography ==
In 1960 she graduated from the school of social workers. In 1962-1964 she worked as a teacher of the school for the blind in Semarang. Later she graduated from journalism courses (1988) and theater courses (1996) in Jakarta. In 1986-1998 she worked as editor of the weekly magazine on culture "Swadesi", and in 1998-1999 - the editor of the tabloid "Eksponen". She was one of the initiators of the creation of the Literary Community of Indonesia (1996). In 1997–2000, together with Ray Sahetali she headed Oncor Theater. In 2007, she headed the association of women writers in Indonesia. She was also a member of the literary committee of the Art Council of Jakarta.

She wrote poems, novels, short stories. She was fond of spiritualism. Published since the 1970s and among the poetic collections are "Letter from the City" (1980), "White Stripes" (1980), "Songs of Granite" (1983), "Ballade of Sarinah" (1985), "Sun" (1986), "Songs of Time" (1987) and others. The main themes of the works are protection of the poor and oppressed, care for the environment, relations between people of different ethnic groups, confessions and social status.

Some of her poems are translated into Russian.

== Selected works ==
=== Poetry collections ===
- Kabut Abadi (Eternal Fog). Lesiba Bali, 1979 (together with Putu Bava Samar Gantang).
- Surat dari Kota (Letter from the city). 1980.
- Jalur-jalur Putih (White stripes). Jakarta: Pustaka Swadesi, 1980.
- Pilar-pilar (Columns). Jakarta: Pustaka Swadesi, 1981 (together with Puta Arya Tirtha Virya).
- Kristal-kristal (Crystals). Jakarta: Pustaka Swadesi, 1982 (together with Dunullah Reyes).
- Nyanyian Granit-granit (Songs of granite). Jakarta: Pustaka Swadesi, 1983.
- Balada Sarinah (The Ballad of Sarinah). Yayasan Sastra Kita, 1985.
- Sang Matahari (the Sun). Yayasan Sastra Kita, 1986.
- Nyanyian Sahabat (Songs of a friend). U.K. Malaysia, 1986 (together with Nur SM).
- Nyanyian Waktu (The Songs of Time). Yayasan Sastra Kita, 1987.
- Balada Anak Manusia (Ballad of the human child). Hardjuna Dwitunggal, 1988.
- Di Antara Langkah-langkah (Among the steps). S.S., 1993.
- Dari Negeri Poci 2 (From the country of tea 2). 1994.
- Dari Negeri Poci 3 (From the country of tea 3). 1996.
- 700 Puisi Pilihan. Perempuan yang Mencari (700 Selected Poems. A Woman who is Looking). Yayasan Japek; Pustaka Yashiba, 2010.
- 3 Di Hati (Three in the Heart). Bandar Aceh: Lapena, 2010 (poems, together with Deknong Kemalawati, Dimas Arika Mihardja).

=== Prose ===
- Musim Cinta Andreas (Andreas' love season, novel). Bandung: Cita, 1980.
- Kembang yang Hilang (Missing flower, novel). Jakarta: San, 1980.
- Denyut-denyut (Heartbeat, a collection of short stories). Flores: Nusa Indah, 1984.
- Senandung Rumah Ibu (Songs of the Mother's House, a collection of short stories). Jakarta: Puspa Swara, 1993.
- Lukisan Matahari (Sunny pictures, a collection of short stories). Yogyakarta: Bentang, 1993.

== Awards ==
- The Gapena Award of Malaysia (1980).
- EBONI Jakarta Award for Contribution to Forest Protection (1993).
- Award of the Surakarta Cultural Center in Java (2003)
- Rancage Literary Award (2004)
- Inclusion in the Book of National Records for the most extensive anthology of poetry (2010).
