= Aminur Rahman =

Bangladeshi poet and writer

- আমিনুর রহমান
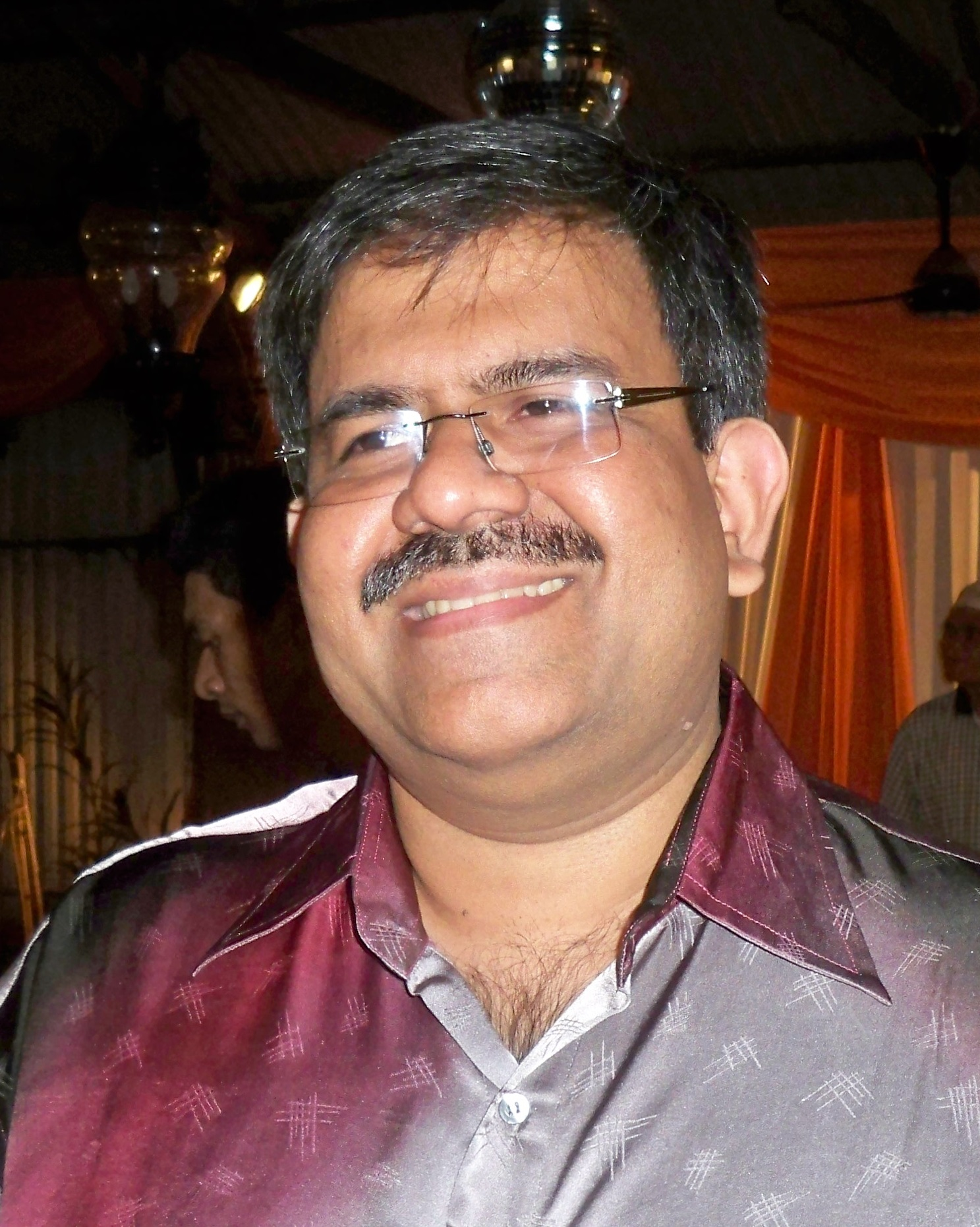
- Rahman in 2012
- Born: 30 October 1966 (age 59); Dhaka, East Pakistan, Pakistan
- Education: University of Dhaka
- Occupations: Poet, translator, literary critic
- Writing career
- Language: Bengali
- Genre: Poetry

Aminur Rahman (born 30 October 1966) is a modern Bangladeshi poet who writes in Bengali. He is considered to be a Rabindranath Tagore follower. He is also engaged in literary translation (published 10 collections of poetry in translations) and literary criticism.

== Career ==
Rahman graduated from the pharmacological faculty of the University of Dhaka. Published 6 collections of poems and three collections of prose in Bangla. The poet's poems have been translated into 25 languages, including English, Arabic, Spanish, Italian, Chinese, Malay, Mongolian, German, Nepali, Russian, Urdu, French, Hindi.

Rahman is involved in literary translation (published 10 collections of poetry in translations), and literary criticism.

Rahman is a member of the editorial board of a number of literary magazines, the editor of many anthologies, including Contemporary Short Stories of the SAARC Region and Poems from the SAARC Region (2011).

Rahman represented Bangladesh at poetry festivals in Great Britain, India, Spain, Iraq, Sri Lanka, Colombia, Malaysia, Japan, Mongolia, Nicaragua.

== Main collections ==
- Aminur Rahman. Bishashikorotole (1989)
- Aminur Rahman. Hridoypure Dubshatar (1991)
- Aminur Rahman. Nivriti Nirvarata (1998, VCD)
- Aminur Rahman. Nirbachito Abritti (2000, CD)
- Aminur Rahman. Thikana: Kobitadhigir Par (2003)
- Aminur Rahman. Annanaya Kabita with CD (2003)

== Aminur Rahman’s poems in translations ==
- Aminur Rahman. Love and Other Poems. Translated by Sudeep Sen. London: Aark Arts, 2001, ISBN 978-1-899179-72-5.
- Aminur Rahman. La escultura. London: Aark Arts, 2002. (Spanish)
- Gedichte von Aminur Rahman und Manfred Chobot. Übersetzung der Gedichte von Aminur Rahman ins Deutsche: Manfred Chobot; Übersetzung der Gedichte von Manfred Chobot ins Bangla: Aminur Rahman. Montreal: Sakak; London and Dhaka: Kathak, 2003; ISBN 1-339-63912-2. (German)
- Aminur Rahman. Love Poems. Edited by Kazuko Shiraishi. Montreal: Sakak, 2004.
- Aminur Rahman. One Poem in Ten Languages. Translated by Sudeep Sen (India), Manfred Chobot (Austria), Dr. Victor A. Pogadaev (Russia), Wu An (Malaysia), Mofazzal Hussain Khan (Bangladesh), Rafael Patino (Colombia), Haji Hamdan Yahya (Malaysia), Yusuke Keida (Japan), Bilkis Mansoor (Bangladesh). Monreal: SAKAK, London, Dhaka: KATHAK, 2004.
- Aminur Rahman. Self-willed Exile (Kerelaan Pembuangan Sendiri); Suicide (Pembunuhan Diri). Translated into Malay by Victor A. Pogadaev. – Numera World Poetry Reading (Baca Puisi Dunia Numera). Kuala Lumpur: Numera, 2012, p. 12–14. (Malay)
- Aminur Rahman. Perpetual Diary (Diario Perpetuo). Translated by Carlos Bedoya, Rafael Patino, Rafael Carcelen Garcia and Maria Menor. Edited by Anastasio Lovo. Granada: Ithaka, 2013. ISBN 9789490347277. (English, Spanish)
- Aminur Rahman. Perpetual Diary (Diari Abadi). Penterjemah Raja Rajeswari. Kuala Lumpur: Numera, 2016.
- Aminur Rahman. Perpetual Diary (Дневник моей жизни). Translation of Victor Pogadaev. M., "Klyuch-S", 2016, 84 p. (Russian, English) ISBN 978-5-906751-58-4
- Aminur Rahman. Perpetual diary – Fortwährendes Tagebuch. Von Manfred Chobot (Übersetzer), Sen Sudeep (Übersetzer). Edition Delta; Auflage: Erstauflage, 2017. ISBN 978-3927648616 (English, German)

== Translations by Aminur Rahman ==
- Bishwo Shera Shamakaleen Chhay Kobir Kobita (World's Best Contemporary Six Poets’ Poems). Dhaka: Adorn Publication, 2017.
- Dhaka Anthology of World Poetry. Dhaka: Adorn Books, 2018

== Awards ==
- Gold medal of Genghis Khan (Mongolia, 2006).
- Heaven Horse Award (Mongolia, 2015).
- International Literary Award A Man of Letters by The Great Malay Nusantara (Malaysia, 2016).
- Contribution Award for International Poetry (Taiwan, 2016)
- Honorary member of World Higher Literary Academic Council of WNWU (Kazakhstan, 2018)
- Bangla Academy Literary Award (2021)

== Impression ==
... Verses of the poet with some touch of existentialism affect the most dear, intimate and understandable for everyone the world of love. Aminur Rahman’s poetry wins the hearts immediately after the first reading. And often forever. An amazing mystery that permeates it, captures and leads deeper into the depths of meaning and rhythm. Mesmerizing is metaphor, strange, original, and in fact very oriental. – Victor A. Pogadaev

... Aminur, like an authentic translator, tied the knot between the original language and translated text, at some points domesticated foreign content, and make it a new original. Keeping the original soul, changing the body, Aminur gives poetry ‘afterlife’ or ‘rebirth’ in his native Bangla language. He translated ... poems ... of different languages ... and the poesy-effect is well-maintained, the kinship of languages is astoundingly balanced, and foreign authors as well as their context is naturalized in Bangla and thereby brought in homeground.- Ahmed Tahsin Shams
