= Institute of Oriental Languages =

Institute of Moscow State University

The Institute of Oriental Languages was founded in 1956 on the basis of a number of departments belonging to History and Philology faculties of Moscow State University. N.A. Smirnov became the first rector (1956–1958). In 1972 the institute was renamed the Institute of Asian and African Studies.

== Famous alumni ==
1. Tatiana Dorofeeva
2. Vladimir Zhirinovsky
3. Yuri Bezmenov
