= Inna Solomonik =

Inna N. Solomonik
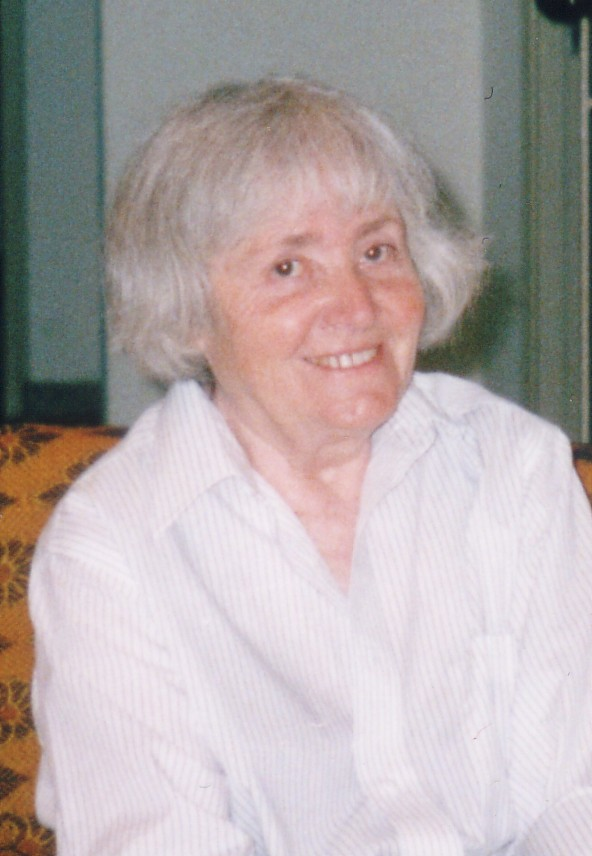
- Inna N. Solomonik. Kuala Lumpur, 2004
- Born: 7 August 1932; Balashikha Moscow Oblast, Russia
- Died: July 14, 2009 (aged 76); Moscow
- Education: PhD
- Alma mater: Moscow State Pedagogical Institute of Foreign Languages
- Occupation: specialist on puppet theatre

Inna Naumovna Solomonik (7 August 1932, Moscow – 14 July 2009, Moscow) was a Soviet and Russian specialist in puppet theatre. She graduated from the Moscow State Pedagogical Institute of Foreign Languages in 1973 (first degree, diploma of French teacher) and got her PhD at the Institute of Oriental Studies under the USSR Academy of Sciences (Moscow) in 1981 (thesis: Javanese Wayang Purwa performance as a semiotic system under the supervision of Dr. Vladimir I. Braginsky).

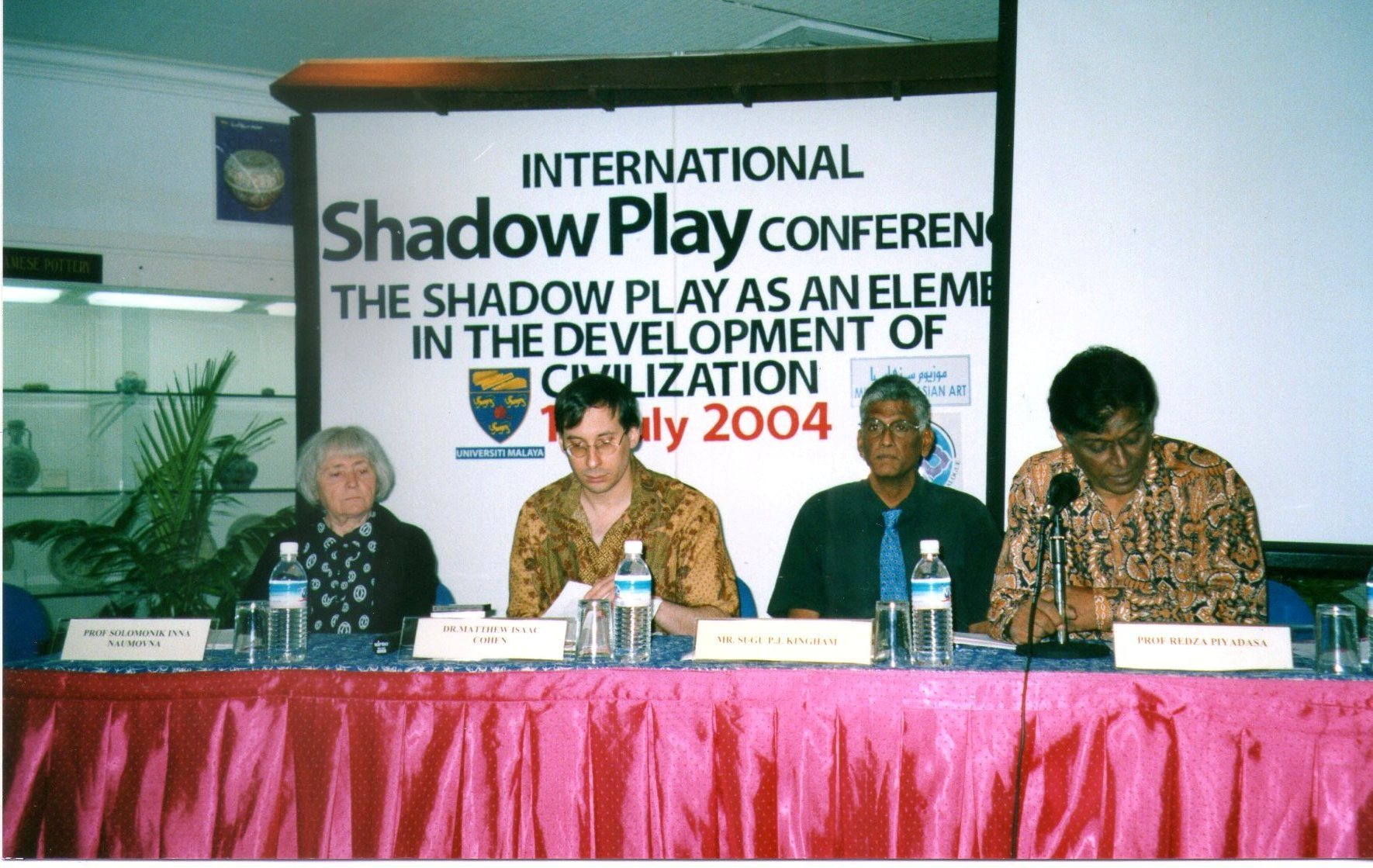
Inna Solomonik at the International Conference "The Shadow Play as an Element in the Development of Civilization" at the University of Malaya (Kuala Lumpur, July, 2004)

Inna Solomonik studied the history of the puppet theatre for over 40 years. From 1961 till 1991 she was a research fellow with the Museum of Puppets under the State Academic Central Puppet Theatre led by Sergey Obraztsov. She began her research career by investigating folk puppet shows in pre-revolutionary Russia, then in Europe and the Americas. By the late 1960s she had prepared a volume of documents and descriptions (about 3000 typed pages) on the history of the Russian folk puppet theatre. In 1993, a small part of this work was printed in the book Puppets come in the stage. Beginning in the mid-1970s, Inna Solomonik turned to studies of oriental puppet performances. In 1980, she was ready with her PhD thesis. The kernel of this research was a semiotic analysis of the silhouettes of Wayang Purwa figures. Later, Inna Solomonik continued to study the Asian puppet theatre, and published two monographs on the subject (1983 and 1992). In 2001, she published the book-album on Javanese Wayang Beber. She was an active member of the Nusantara Society. She died on 14 July 2009.

== Publications ==
1. “Wayang Purwa Puppets: the Language of the Silhouette” - in: “Bijdragen tot de Taal-, Land- en Volkenkunde”, 136 (1980), no: 4, Leiden, hlm. 482-497.
2. Traditsionny teatr kukol Vostoka. Osnovnie vidi teatra ploskikh izobrazheny [Traditional Puppet Theatre of Oriental Main Types of the Flat Image Performances]. Moscow: “Nauka”, 1983. – 184 p.p.; ill.
3. Traditsionny teatr kukol Vostoka. Osnovnie vidi teatra ob’yomnikh form [Traditional Puppet Theatre of Oriental. Main Types of the Three-dimensional Image Performances]. Moscow: “Nauka”, 1992. – 312 p.p.; ill.
4. "Reasons for the present‐day situation in soviet puppet theatre" - in "Contemporary Theatre Review". Volume 1, 1992 - Issue 1, p. 83-84.
5. "The Oriental Roots of Soviet Rod Puppets" - in: “Contemporary Thea-tre Review” 1, 1992, hlm. 37–40.
6. Kukli vikhodyat na sstsenu. (Puppets come in the stage). Moscow: “Prosveshchenie”, 1993. – 160 p.p.; ill.
7. Wayang Beber: teatr ili magichesky obryad? (Wayang Beber: a theatre or a magic rite?). Moscow: “GEOS”, 2001. –78 p.p.; ill.
8. Международная конференция «Теневой театр как элемент развития цивилизации» (1–2 июля 2004 г.,Куала Лумпур, Малайзия). -
9. “The Invisible Through the Visible. The Analysis of Traditional Shadow and Puppet Performance” – in: Dimensions of Shadow Play in Malay Civilisation. Kuala Lumpur: UM, Centre for Civilisational Dialogue, 2006, hlm. 87-98.
