= Arika (name) =

Arika is an English and Japanese feminine given name. People with this name include:

- Arika Gurung (born 2004), Nepali karate practitioner
- Arika Kane (born 1985), American record producer and songwriter
- Arika Kimura (1900–1996), Japanese botanist
- Arika Okrent, American linguist and writer
- Dimas Arika Mihardja (1959–2018), Indonesian poet

== See also ==
- Arika, Japanese video game developer
