= Sakmarsky District =

Sakmarsky District Сакмарский район (Russian)
- District
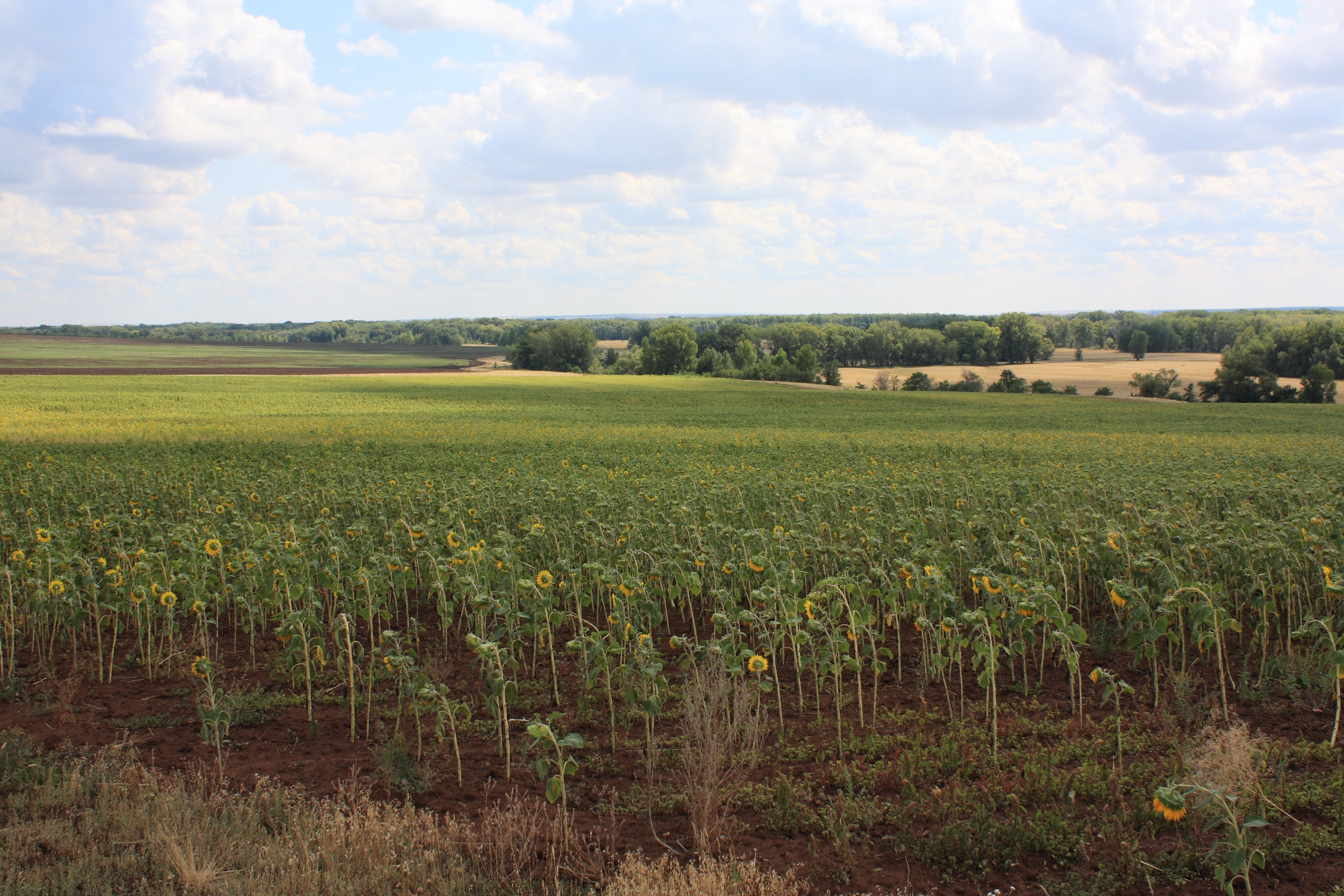
- East of Kamenka, Sakmarsky District

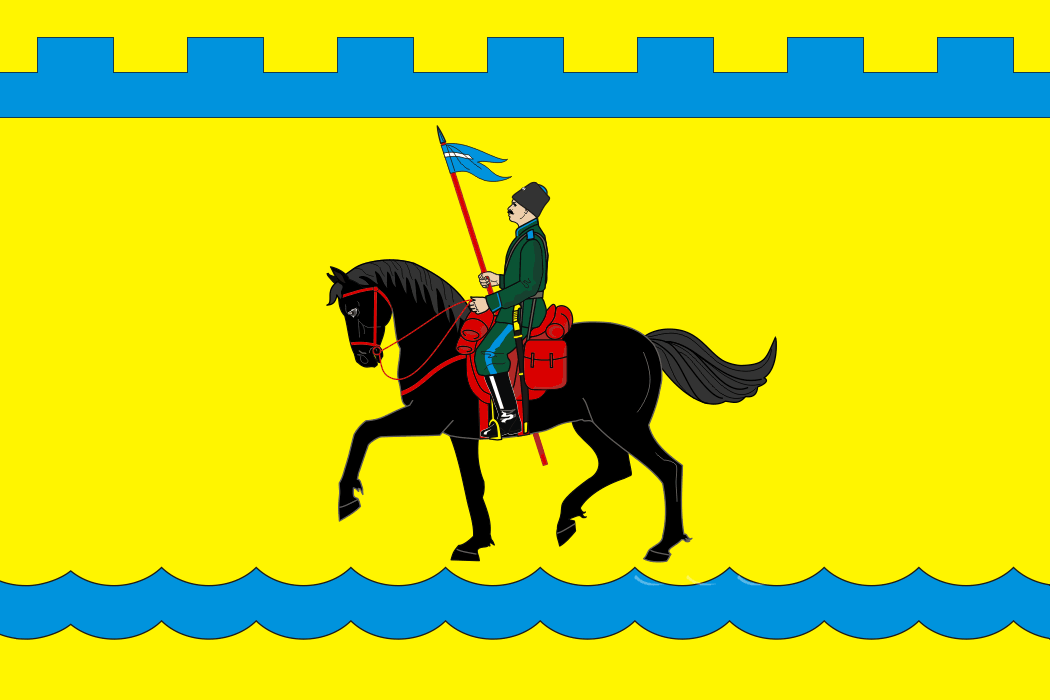
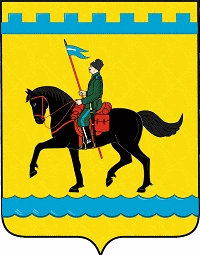
- Flag Coat of arms
- Location of Sakmarsky District in Orenburg Oblast
- Coordinates: 51°59′30″N 55°19′53″E
- Country: Russia
- Federal subject: Orenburg Oblast
- Established: 1935
- Administrative center: Sakmara

Area
  - Total: 2,061 km^{2} (796 sq mi)

Population (2010 Census)
  - Total: 29,179
  - Density: 14.16/km^{2} (36.67/sq mi)
  - Urban: 0%
  - Rural: 100%

Administrative structure
  - Administrative divisions: 15 Selsoviets, 1 Settlement councils
  - Inhabited localities: 47 rural localities

Municipal structure
  - Municipally incorporated as: Sakmarsky Municipal District
  - Municipal divisions: 0 urban settlements, 15 rural settlements
- Time zone: UTC+5 (MSK+2)
- OKTMO ID: 53640000
- Website: http://xn--80aaa5afbcbqqksdff.xn--p1ai/

Sakmarsky District (Russian: Сакмарский райо́н) is an administrative and municipal district (raion), one of the thirty-five in Orenburg Oblast, Russia. It is located in the center of the oblast. The area of the district is 2,061 square kilometers (796 sq mi). Its administrative center is the rural locality (a selo) of Sakmara. Population: 29,179 (2010 Census); 28,569 (2002 census); 26,384 (1989 Soviet census). The population of Sakmara accounts for 17.2% of the total district's population.
