= Great Malay Nusantara =

Literary association in Malaysia

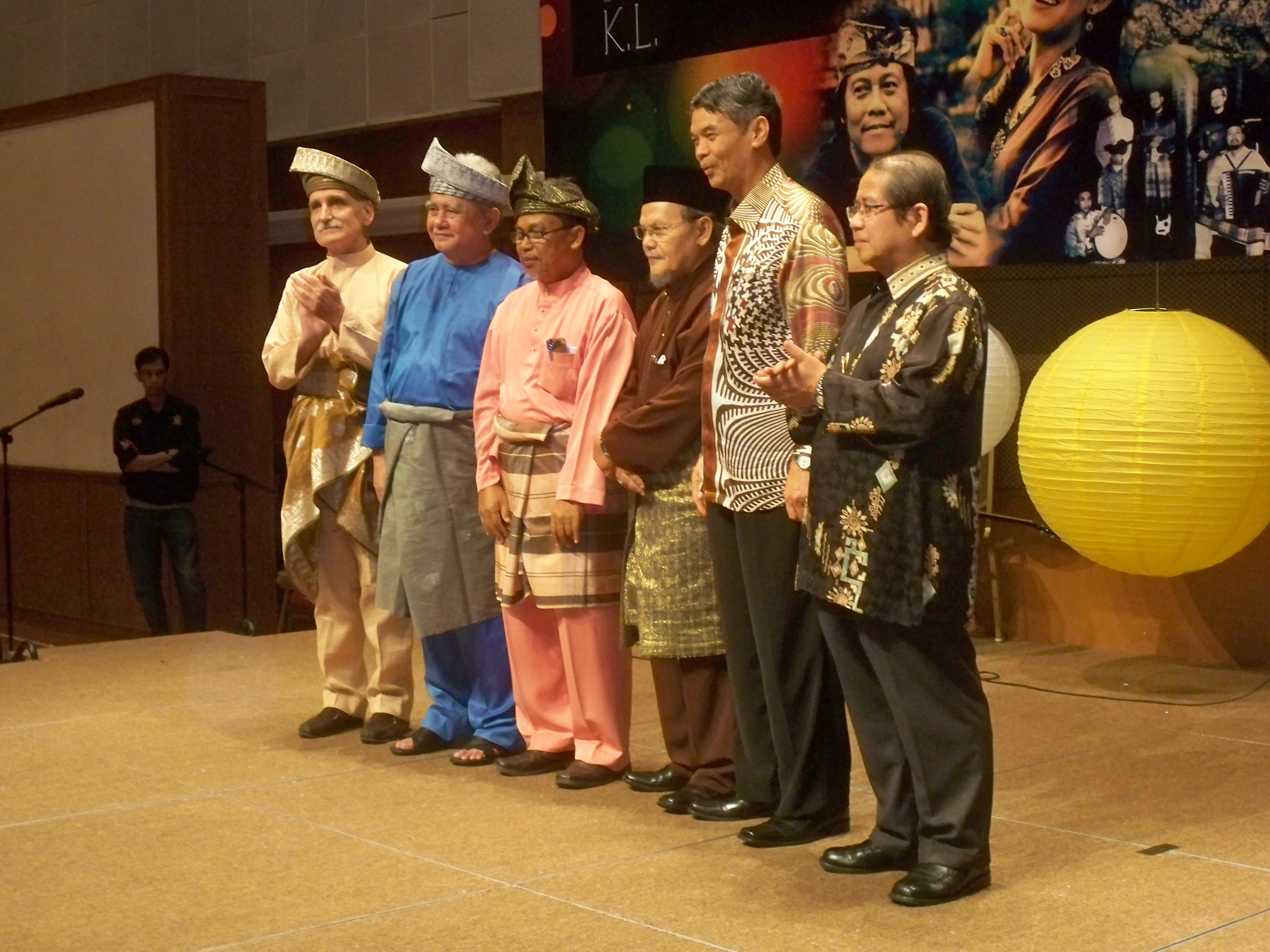
- Numera Award Ceremony. Kuala Lumpur, November 20, 2013
- Formation: 2011; 15 years ago
- Type: NGO
- Purpose: Promote Malay language and Malay literature in the world, to develop contacts and cooperation between the writers of Nusantara countries
- Location: Kuala Lumpur
- Region served: International
- Official language: Malay
- President: Ahmad Kamal Abdullah

Great Malay Nusantara (Malay: Nusantara Melayu Raya - Numera) is a literary association in Malaysia. Founded in 2011 on the initiative of the famous Malaysian poet, S.E.A. Write Award winner, Malaysian National Laureate Ahmad Kamal Abdullah. The goal of the organization is to promote the Malay language and Malay literature in the world, to develop contacts and cooperation between the writers of Nusantara countries (Brunei, Indonesia, Malaysia, Singapore, South Thailand).

From the very beginning Numera showed its potential by holding a number of international events and quickly gained recognition both at home and abroad.

In March 2012, Numera together with the municipality of the Indonesian city of Padang (Sumatra) organized a seminar on "History and culture of Southeast Asia", which was attended by more than 200 participants, mainly from Indonesia and Malaysia, with 53 papers on various aspects of the history and culture of the Malay world.

In September 2012, it organized in Kuala Lumpur International poetry readings and seminar "Poets of the world, civilization and crisis of the XXI century" with the participation of more than 50 poets, writers, translators, scientists from 7 countries (Bangladesh, Brunei, Indonesia, Malaysia, Russia, Thailand, Singapore), including the distinguished Bangladesh poet and translator Aminur Rahman, an Indonesian veteran poet from Aceh LK Ara, the National Writer of Malaysia Kemala, the S.E.A. Write Award laureates Brunei poet Zefri Arif and Malaysian poets Siti Zainon Ismail and Abdul Ghafar Ibrahim (AGI), Director General of Malaysia Council for Language and Literature Awang Sariyan and others.

== Numera Awards ==
Since 2013, Numera started also to give international awards for the development of the Malay language and literature with the title of " Man of Letters of Numera."

The first winners of the award which was given on November 20, 2013, were the Indonesian poet Abdul Hadi Wiji Muthari, the Malaysian scholar Sharif Abu Bakar and the Russian orientalist Victor A. Pogadaev.

In 2016, the awards were given to Aminur Rahman (Bangladesh), Muhammad Haji Salleh (Malaysia) and Sastri Bakri (Indonesia).

In 2017, the awards were given to Khudan Hidayat and Putu Ikhirma from Indonesia, as well as to Wan Abu Bakar and Norazima Abu Bakar from Malaysia.
