= Andrey Fursov =

Soviet-Russian scholar and author (born 1951)

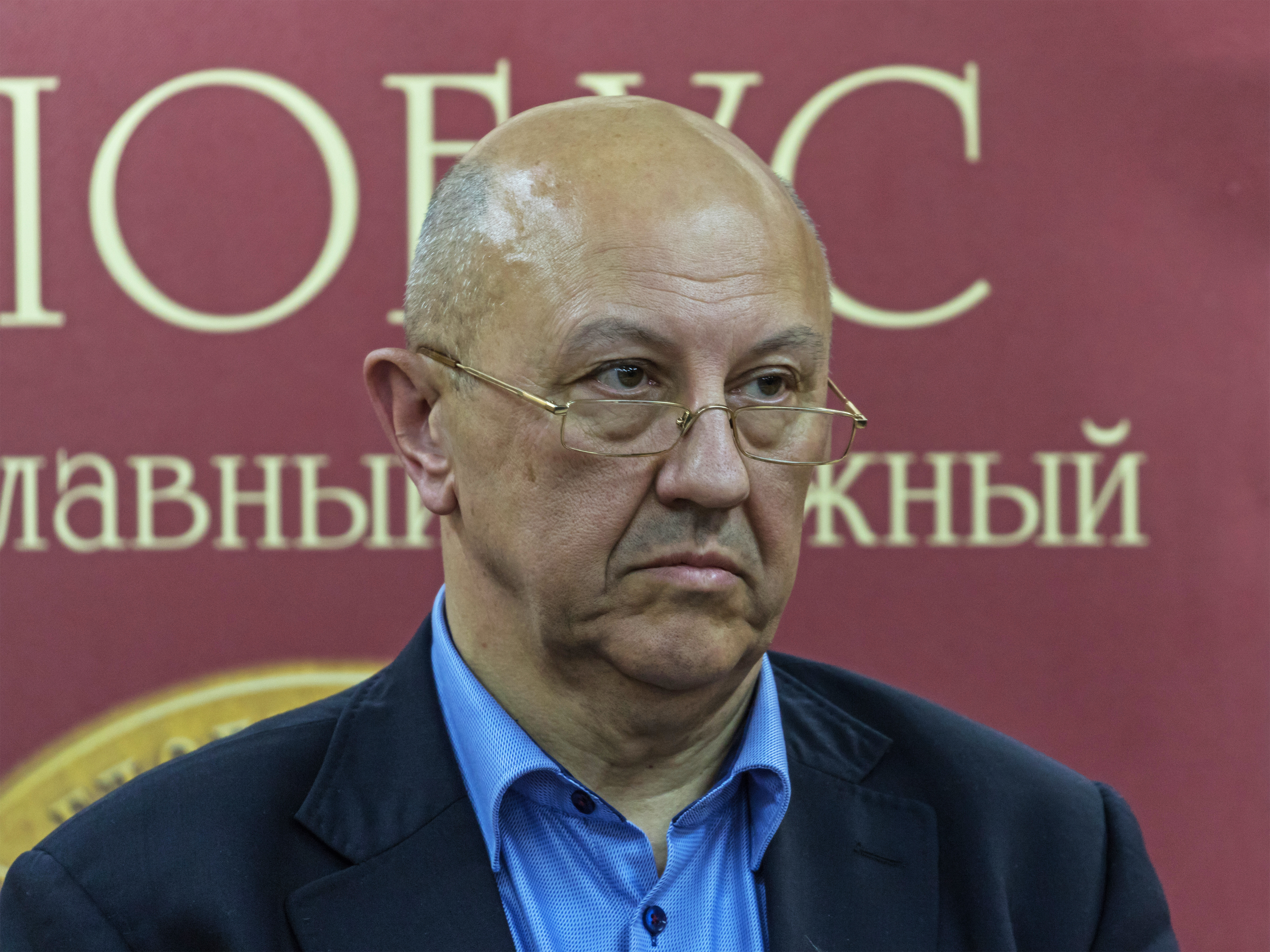
- Fursov in 2017
- Born: Andrey Ilyich Fursov; 16 May 1951 (age 75); Shchyolkovo, Moscow Oblast, Russian SFSR, USSR
- Education: Institute of Asian and African Countries
- Occupations: Historian, social philosopher, opinion writer, sociologist, political scientist
- Employer(s): Russian State University for the Humanities (1997–2006); Institute of Scientific Information on Social Sciences of the Russian Academy of Sciences (1981–2017); Moscow State University
- Website: http://andreyfursov.ru/

Andrey Ilyich Fursov (Russian: Андрей Ильич Фурсов; born 16 May 1951) is a Soviet-Russian historian and author, Candidate of History Sciences, and a member of the Union of Writers of Russia (2010). From 1997 to 2006, Fursov headed the Institute of Russian History (Russian State University for the Humanities). He headed a department at Moscow State University.

He graduated from the MSU in 1973 (Faculty of History and Philology, Institute of Asian and African Countries). In 1986 he defended his Candidat dissertation.

From 1981 he worked at the Institute of Scientific Information on Social Sciences of the Russian Academy of Sciences. He refused to join the CPSU.

He was an expert in the trial Yeltsin vs. the CPSU (1992). He has a negative attitude towards Lenin.

Fursov is the author of 12 monographs. His first major work was published in 1986. Its co-author is Yuri Pivovarov.

He is a Moskva (magazine) award winner (2007). He is a Nash Sovremennik award winner (2013, 2014, 2017)., and an academician of the International Academy of Sciences (2009).
