= Ajip Rosidi =

Indonesian author (1938–2020)

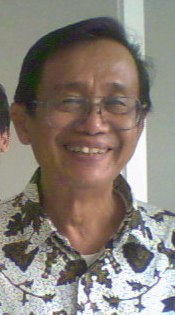
- Ajip Rosidi in 2011
- Born: 31 January 1938; Majalengka, Dutch East Indies
- Died: 29 July 2020 (aged 82); Magelang, Indonesia
- Occupation: Author
- Spouses: Fatimah Wirjadibrata (m. 1955; died 2014) Nani Wijaya (m. 2017)
- Writing career
- Period: 1953–2020
- Genre: Literature

Ajip Rosidi (31 January 1938 – 29 July 2020) was an Indonesian poet and short story writer. As of 1983 he had published 326 works in 22 different magazines.

== Biography ==
Rosidi was born on 31 January 1938, in Jatiwangi, Majalengka, West Java. He attended the School of the People, Jatiwangi, in 1950; District VIII Junior High School Jakarta in 1953; and Taman Madya High School, Taman.Siswa Jakarta in 1956. He began his literary career at the age of fourteen years. Since 1952, his works began to appear in magazines such as "Indonesia", "Indonesia Pulpit", "Arena/Ploy", "Confrontation" and "Zenith Platform".

As a child, he read numerous translated works in both Indonesian and Sundanese. He is also known as Sundanese Poet. After reading a guide to writing, Rosidi began writing poems and short stories. His first short story was published in the children's section of Indonesia Raya when he was 12. By the age of 15, his work was being published in local magazines. He was paid between Rp 25 and Rp 125 per piece, a considerable amount of money then. Two years later, he released his first collection of short stories, published under the title Tahun-tahun Kematian (Years of Death). He subsequently dropped out of high school to focus on writing. At age 17, he attended African American author Richard Wright's lecture "Seniman dan Masaalahnja" (The Artist and His Problems) at the Balai Budaja in Jakarta.

Rosidi's works have been translated into many foreign languages, published in anthologies or as a book, in Dutch, Chinese, English, Japanese. He has also translated many biographies. He served as editor of numerous magazines, including Suluh Pelajar (Student Torch) from 1953 to 1955, and Prosa in 1955. In 1962, together with writer Ramadhan KH, Harris Obon, and Tatang Suryaatmadja, he founded the Publisher Kiwari. From 1964 to 1970 he served as the director of the publishing house Tjupumanik, along with the publishers Duta Rakyat from 1965 to 1968 and Dunia Pustaka Jaya from 1971 to 1979. During the years 1965–67, he became the founder and chief editor of "Weekly Sundanese", later referred to as "Madjalah Sundanese", which was published in Bandung. In 1968 he proposed Ali Sadikin, the then governor of Jakarta, to form the Jakarta Arts Council (DKJ), in which he served as the chairman for three consecutive periods from 1972 to 1981. Meanwhile, during the years 1966 to 1975, he also served as the head of the Association of Sundanese Writers. In 1971, he led the National Library Publisher Jaya (Jaya Raya Foundation). In 1973, Congress IKAPI chose Rosidi as the chairman of the agency. For the period 1976–79, he was re-elected for the same.

In 1981, Rosidi served as Guest Lecturer of Indonesian language and literature at the Osaka University of Foreign Studies (Gaikokugo Daigaku Osaka) in Osaka, Japan, Professor Extraordinary at the Tenri Daigaku, Nara from 1983 to 1994, and Kyoto Sangyo Daigaku, Kyoto from 1983 to 1996. While in Japan he also taught at the Asahi Cultural Center. In 2003, he retired and returned to Indonesia. In 2004, he became the general manager of Sundanese-language monthly magazine, Cupumanik.

On 31 January 2008 Rosidi released his autobiography, Hidup Tanpa Ijasah (Living Without a Diploma). The launching ceremony was held at Padjadjaran University. On 31 January 2011, he was awarded a Doctorate Honoris Causa from the field of Cultural Studies, Faculty of Letters, University of Padjadjaran. As of 2008, Rosidi resided in Pabelan, Magelang.

== Activism ==
Rosidi worked to preserve Sundanese culture as well as other cultures of Indonesia, promoted the continued use of local languages and awarded the Rancage Literary Award to works in Sundanese; he provided two other awards for works in Javanese and Balinese. He founded and led the research project and folklore Pantun Sundanese (PPP-FS), during the period 1970–1973. In 2000 he wrote Encyclopedia: Encyclopedia of Culture Sundanese. He encouraged research on ancient Sundanese manuscripts. He asserted that from about 200 ancient Sundanese manuscripts found so far, only about 23 scripts can be read. Rosidi expressed reservations regarding what he viewed as the commercialization of culture, citing the existence of Indonesia's Ministry of Culture and Tourism as proof that culture is being sold.

== Bibliography ==
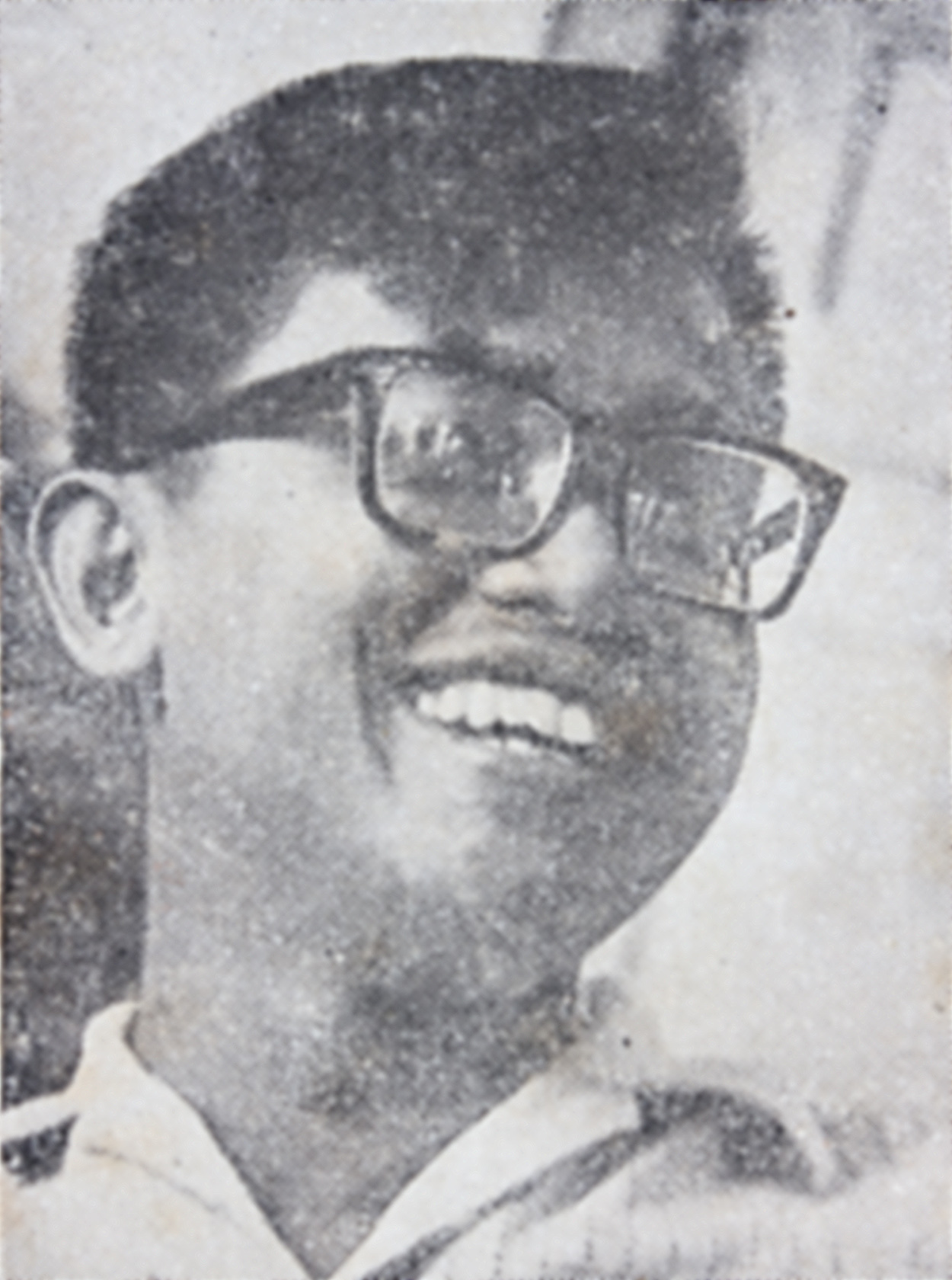
Rosidi in c. 1967

- Rosidi, Ajip (1950). Pertemuan kembali (in Indonesian). Jakarta: Nusantara. p. 97. OCLC 61626909.
- Rosidi, Ajip (1959). Ajip Rosidi membitjarakan tjerita pendek Indonesia (in Indonesian). Jakarta: Djambatan. p. 176. OCLC 24845104.
- Rosidi, Ajip (1962). Purba Sari Aju Wangi; sebuah tjerita klasika Sunda (in Indonesian). Vol. 10. Jakarta: Aryaguna. OCLC 2050577.
- Rosidi, Ajip (1963). Kandjutkundang; prosa djeung puisi Sunda sabada pĕrang (in Indonesian). Jakarta: Balai Pustaka. p. 483. OCLC 63262040.
- Rosidi, Ajip (1968). Mundinglaja di Kusumah; sebuah tjerita pantun Sunda (in Indonesian). Jakarta: Gunung Agung. p. 165. OCLC 2334232.
- Rosidi, Ajip (1970). Dua orang dukun dan tjerpén² Sunda lainnya / dipilih, diterjemahkan dan diberi pengantar oléh Ajip Rosidi (in Indonesian). Bandung: Budaja Djaja. p. 278. OCLC 285250.
- Rosidi, Ajip (1972). Ajip Rosidi : [gedichten] (in Dutch). Rotterdam: Rotterdamse Kunststichting. OCLC 63842429.
- Rosidi, Ajip (1972). Djakarta dalam puisi Indonesia : disusun dan diberi pengantar oleh Ajip Rosidi (in Dutch). Jakarta: Dewan Kesenian Djakarta. OCLC 220228044.
- Rosidi, Ajip (1973). Masalah angkatan dan periodisasi sedjarah sastra Indonésia beserta sepilihan karangan lain (in Indonesian). Jakarta: Pustaka Jaya. p. 176. OCLC 4141404.
- Rosidi, Ajip; Zulverdi, Ed; Hutasoit, Djaulham (1974). TIM : Taman Ismail Marzuki (in Indonesian). Jakarta: Dewan Kesenian Jakarta. p. 101. OCLC 3033945.
- Rosidi, Ajip (1975). Voyage de noces: roman [Honeymoon: novel] (in French). Paris: Puyraimond. OCLC 2839781.
- Rosidi, Ajip (1975). Sang Kuriang kesiangan : sebuah cerita rakyat Sunda (in Indonesian). Jakarta: Pustaka Jaya. OCLC 7996513.
- Rosidi, Ajip (1977). Si Kabayan dan beberapa dongeng Sunda lainnya (in Indonesian). Jakarta: Gunung Agung. OCLC 9349877.
- Rosidi, Ajip (1978). Affandi 70 [i.e. tujuh puluh] tahun : disusun oleh Ajip Rosidi, Zaini [dan] Sudarmadji (in Indonesian). Jakarta: Dewan Kesenian Jakarta. OCLC 220236698.
- Rosidi, Ajip (1983). Candra Kirana : sebuah saduran atas sebuah cerita Panji, Seri Pustaka Klasik Indonesia, no. 1 (in Indonesian). Jakarta: Pustaka Jaya. p. 271. OCLC 23543876.
- Rosidi, Ajip (1984). Undang-Undang Hak Cipta, 1982 : pandangan seorang awam (in Indonesian). Jakarta: Djambatan. p. 159. OCLC 12443088.
- Rosidi, Ajip (1985). Membicarakan puisi Indonesia (in Indonesian). Jakarta: Binacipta. p. 199. OCLC 13331256.
- Rosidi, Ajip (1986). Dengkleung dengdek : kumpulan esey jeung kritik ngeunaan basa Sunda jeung sastra Sunda (in Indonesian). Bandung: Angkasa. p. 191. ISBN 9789794041062. OCLC 20395958.
- Rosidi, Ajip (1986). Purba Sari Ayu Wangi (Lutung Kasarung) (in Indonesian). Jakarta: Pustaka Jaya. p. 308. OCLC 20797883.
- Rosidi, Ajip (1988). Ajip Rosidi satengah abad (in Sundanese). Bandung: Pustaka Karsa Sunda. p. 248. OCLC 63929178.
- Rosidi, Ajip (1988). Nama dan makna (in Indonesian). Jakarta: Pustaka Jaya. ISBN 9789794190623. OCLC 20095636.
- Rosidi, Ajip (1993). Terkenang topeng Cirebon : pilihan sajak (in Indonesian). Jakarta: Pustaka Jaya. p. 272. ISBN 9789794191163. OCLC 30558892.
- Rosidi, Ajip (1997). Asrul Sani 70 tahun : penghargaan dan penghormatan (in Indonesian). Jakarta: Pustaka Jaya. p. 317. ISBN 9789794192252. OCLC 37552468.
- Rosidi, Ajip (1998). Perjalanan penganten : sebuah kisah (in Indonesian). Jakarta: Pustaka Jaya. p. 171. ISBN 9789794192382. OCLC 41892525.
- Rosidi, Ajip (1999). Bahasa nusantara : suatu pemetaan awal: gambaran tentang bahasa-bahasa daerah di Indonesia (in Indonesian). Jakarta: Pagelaran Bahasa Nusantara. OCLC 50561515.
- Rosidi, Ajip (2001). Modern Sundanese poetry: voices from West Java in Sundanese and English. Jakarta: Pustaka Jaya. p. 176. ISBN 9789794192863. OCLC 48558950.
- Rosidi, Ajip (2001). Hurip waras! : dua panineungan (in Sundanese). Bandung: Kiblat Buku Utama. p. 245. OCLC 50292283.
- Rosidi, Ajip (2001). Puisi Sunda modern dalam dua bahasa (in Indonesian). Jakarta: Pustaka Jaya. ISBN 9789794192856. OCLC 48500933.
- McGlynn, John H. (2001). Manhattan sonnet: Indonesian poems, short stories, and essays about New York. Jakarta: Lontar Foundation. p. 101. ISBN 9789798083402. OCLC 49259992.
- Rosidi, Ajip (2001). Ucang-ucang angge : panineungan (in Sundanese). Bandung: Kiblat Buku Utama. p. 260. OCLC 50561845.
- Rosidi, Ajip (2002). Hadiah sastera "Rancagé" 2002 : penyerahan hadiah diselenggarakan atas kerjasama Yayasan Kebudayaan "Rancagé" dengan Universitas Negeri Surabaya (UNESA) di kampus Ketintang, Surabaya : Sabtu, 31 Agustus 2002 (in Indonesian). Jakarta: Yayasan Kebudayaan "Rancagé". OCLC 208128921.
- Rosidi, Ajip (2003). Orang dan bambu Jepang : catatan seorang gaijin (in Indonesian). Jakarta: Pustaka Jaya. p. 180. ISBN 9789794193129. OCLC 60543487.
- Rosidi, Ajip (2004). Hadiah sastera "Rancagé" 2004 : penyerahan hadiah diselenggarakan atas kerjasama Yayasan Kebudayaan "Rancagé" dengan Universitas Pakuan, Bogor : 31 Maret 2004 (in Indonesian). Jakarta: Yayasan Kebudayaan "Rancagé". OCLC 208131307.
- Rosidi, Ajip (2004). Kartika : looking back through life. Yogyakarta: Museum Affandi. p. 96. OCLC 61169519.
- Rosidi, Ajip (2006). Pantun anak ayam (in Indonesian). Jakarta: Pustaka Jaya. ISBN 9789794193372. OCLC 125409803.
- Ajip Rosidi; Edi Suhardi Ekajati; Adeng Chaedar Alwasilah; Yayasan Kebudayaan Rancage (2006). Konferensi Internasional Budaya Sunda (KIBS): prosiding (in Indonesian). Vol. 2. Bandung: Yayasan Kebudayaan Rancage. OCLC 77825536.
- Rosidi, Ajip; Djiwapradja, Dodong (2007). Polemik undak-usuk basa Sunda (in Sundanese). Bandung: Kiblat. ISBN 9789793631967. OCLC 225672834.
- Rosidi, Ajip (2007). Sajak Sunda (in Sundanese). Bandung: Kiblat : Paguyuban Panglawungan Sastra Sunda. ISBN 9789793631950. OCLC 132681573.
- Rosidi, Ajip (2008). Yang datang telanjang : surat-surat Ajip Rosidi dari Jepang, 1980-2002 (in Sundanese). Jakarta: Kepustakaan Populer Gramedia. ISBN 978-979-9100-95-5. OCLC 271611500.
- Rosidi, Ajip (2008). Hidup tanpa ijazah : yang terekam dalam kenangan : otobiografi Ajip Rosidi (in Indonesian). Jakarta: Pustaka Jaya. p. 1330. ISBN 978-979-419-345-7. OCLC 212909156.
- Rosidi, Ajip (2008). Candra Kirana : sebuah saduran atas cerita Panji (in Indonesian). Bandung: Nuansa. p. 271. ISBN 978-979-1362-68-9. OCLC 271611505.
