= Ahmad Kamal Abdullah =

Malaysian writer (1941–2021)

Yang Berbahagia Dato' Ahmad Kamal Abdullah DPMS KMN AMN
- أحمد کمال عبدﷲ
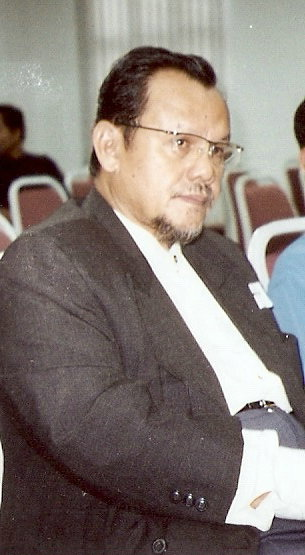
- Kemala, University of Malaya, 2004
- Born: Ahmad Kamal Abdullah; 30 January 1941; Gombak, Kuala Lumpur, British Malaya (now Malaysia)
- Died: 27 October 2021 (aged 80); Kota Damansara, Selangor, Malaysia
- Resting place: Section 9 Kota Damansara Muslim Cemetery, Petaling Jaya, Selangor
- Citizenship: Malaysia
- Education: Maktab Perguruan Sultan Idris; Universiti Sains Malaysia; National University of Malaysia
- Occupations: Poet, playwright, literary critic
- Writing career
- Pen name: Kemala
- Language: Malay
- Period: 1958–1962
- Genre: Poetry
- Notable awards: Malaysian National Laureate (2011)

Ahmad Kamal Abdullah (30 January 1941 – 27 October 2021) was a Malaysian poet, novelist, playwright, literary critic and Malaysian National Laureate (2011). He was known under the pseudonym Kemala.

== Biography ==
His father, Abdullah Hj. Daud was an alumnus of the Kuala Kangsar Malay College in which its admission was restricted to children of the elite class, while his paternal grandfather was influential in the village as its main religious teacher and imam. His mother, Rukiah Amir, on the other hand was a well-versed storyteller and poet.

From 1958 to 1962, Kemala studied at Sultan Idris Teacher's College (Maktab Perguruan Sultan Idris, now the Sultan Idris Education University) in Tanjung Malim. He left the field of teaching in 1968 to work as the Chief Editor for the Dewan Bahasa dan Pustaka leading several of its magazine publishings.

In 2000, he defended his thesis on Malay literature and received his doctorate at the National University of Malaysia. He was a chief initiator of the International Poetic Readings in Kuala Lumpur and played a major role in the founding of the international Malay language writers organization Nusantara Melayu Raya, or NUMERA in 2012.

He was formerly an honorary member of the Nusantara Society since 22 November 2017.

Kemala died on 27 October 2021 at the age of 80 at his son's house in Kota Damansara. He had several illnesses including kidney problem prior to his death. He was buried at the Section 9 Kota Damansara Muslim cemetery after Asar prayer.

== Literary career ==
He took an active part in the movement of "poetry of social protest" and was also known as the author of the philosophical and love lyrics.

He continued the traditions of poetic-philosophical understanding of the world laid by the poet-mystic Hamzah Fansuri, developing them and introducing his own rhythms and colors. His verses, sometimes with a touch of religious mysticism, create an atmosphere of poetic meditation of a man who constantly is in amazement of the mysteries of life.

He was the author of poetic collections Meditasi ("Meditation", 1972), Serah Terima ("Transfer of Affairs", 1973), Era (1975), Kaktus-Kaktus ("Cacti", 1976), Ayn (1983, 1989), Pelabuhan Putih ("The White Harbour", 1989), Titir Zikir ("A Drop of Dhikr", 1995), and Ziarah Tanah Kudup (Pilgrimage to the Land of Flowers, 2006). His book Mim (1999) absorbed various creative motifs, including reflections on the poet's and his poetry's place and impressions of his trip to the Soviet Union a decade before in October 1989.

== Criticism. Evaluation of creativity ==
Russian literary critic and researcher Anna Pogadaeva comments on the style of Ahmad Kamal's writing, stating that:

"His poems are musical, full of inner rhythm, he perfectly uses all the possibilities of the Malay language, extracting from it sometimes tender and sincere, sometimes ecstatic and explosive sounds, filling each line with movement and turning each verse into a living organism. The combination of feelings and visions permeated with a passionate love for God is the inexhaustible source of the poet's creative inspiration: it is a fusion of sounding image and music, avant-gardism and traditional Sufi motifs, as well as a rhythmic series of folklore forms."

== Awards ==
- Literary Prize of Malaysia (1972, 1995, 1999)
- Ahli Mangku Negara (AMN) (1986)
- S.E.A. Write Award, Thailand (1986)
- Kesatria Mangku Negara (KMN) (1995)
- Dato' Paduka Mahkota Selangor (DPMS) (2001)
- The title of Pujangga (Writer), Sultan Idris Pedagogical University (2003)
- Selangor Literary Prize (2005)
- Award of Abdul Rahman Auf (2006)
- Malaysian National Laureate (2011)
