= Dimas Arika Mihardja =

Indonesian poet (1959–2018)

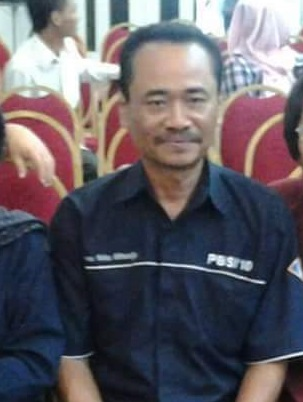
- Dimas Arika Mihardja at the Nusantara Poets Meeting (Jambi, December 28, 2012)
- Born: Sudaryono; July 3, 1959; Yogyakarta
- Died: April 5, 2018 (aged 58); Kotabaru, Jambi
- Citizenship: Indonesia
- Education: Pedagogical Institute "Sanat Dharma" (Yogyakarta)
- Occupation: poet
- Writing career
- Pen name: Dimas Arika Mihardja
- Language: Indonesian
- Years active: since 1980s
- Genre: poetry

Dimas Arika Mihardja (July 3, 1959 in Yogyakarta – April 5, 2018 in Kotabaru, Jambi) was an Indonesian poet and scholar, essayist. He wrote under a pseudonym, the real name is Sudaryono. Among friends he was called as Dam.

== Brief biography ==
He graduated from a secondary school with a humanitarian specialization (SNAS) and the Pedagogical Institute "Sanat Dharma" in Yogyakarta.

In 1985, he moved to Jambi, where since 1986, he began teaching Indonesian literature and culture at the Jambi University. In 2002, he defended his doctoral dissertation at the State University of Malang.

He died of kidney failure.

== Creativity ==
He was actively engaged in poetic activity since the 1980s. He is considered to be one of the brightest representatives of the Generation 2000 in the Indonesian literature, who made a significant contribution to the development of the Indonesian vers libre. He regularly conducted poetry workshops which were very popular among other poets.

His poetry is characterized by imagery and an abundance of original metaphors.

== The main works ==
=== Poetry collections ===
- Sang Guru Sejati (Bengkel Puisi Swadaya Mandiri) (1991)
- Malin Kundang (Bengkel Puisi Swadaya Mandiri) (1993)
- Upacara Gerimis (Bengkel Puisi Swadaya Mandiri) (1994)
- Potret Diri (Bengkel Puisi Swadaya Mandiri) (1997)
- Ketika Jarum Jam Leleh dan Lelah Berdetak (Bengkel Puisi Swadaya Mandiri danTelanai Printing Graft) (2003).
- Koleksi puisi warga Bengkel Puisi Swadaya Mandiri (2012) ISBN 9786021829479
- Nikah Kata-Kata: Antologi Puisi Karya Sarjana Media. Kuala Lumpur: Sarjana Media, 2013 (with Rohani Din)
- Beranda Senja: Setengah Abad Dimas Arika Mihardja. Jakarta: Kosa Kata Kita, 2010. ISBN 9786028966047
- Sajak Emas: 200 Puisi Seksi. Jakarta: Kosa Kata Kita, 2010. ISBN 978-6028966030
- 3 di Hati. Banda Aceh: Penerbit LAPENA, Institute for Culture and Society, 2010 (with Diah Hadaning and Deknong Kemalawati)

=== Other works ===
- Catatan Harian Maya (novel, published in the newspaper ‘Independent’ – Jambi, 2002).
- Pasemon dalam Wacana Puisi Indonesia. Kelompok Studi Penulisan, 2003 (monograph on the basis of the dissertation)
- Resensi sastra (2015) ISBN 9786027731400 (a collection of critical articles)

=== Participation in anthologies with other authors ===
- Riak-Riak Batang hari (Teater Bohemian, 1988)
- Percik Pesona 1 & 2 (Taman Budaya Jambi, 1992, 1993)
- Serambi 1, 2 & 3 (Teater Bohemian, 1992, 1993, 1994)
- Rendezvous (1993)
- Luka Liwa (1993)
- Pusaran Waktu (1994)
- Muaro (1995)
- Negeri Bayang-Bayang (1996)
- Mimbar Penyair Abad 21
- Antologi Puisi Indonesia (1997)
- Angkatan 2000 (2000)
- Angkatan 2000 dalam Sastra Indonesia. Jakarta: Gramedia, 2002
- Puisi Menolak Korupsi I (2013)
- Puisi Menolak Korupsi II (2014)
- Memo Untuk Presiden (2014)
- Dari Negeri Poci 5 (2014)

== Translations into Russian ==
- Three dimensions: heart (Tiga Dimensi: Hati); Three dimensions: earth, sea, sky (Tiga Dimensi: Bumi, Laut, Langit); The poem of tragedy (Puisi Tragedi).

== Family ==
- Wife Rita Indrawati, daughters: Marend Atika Mh., Riyandari Asrita Mh., Dyah Ayu Sukmawati.

== See also ==
- Puisi Kopi Dimas Arika Mihardja
- Sajak-sajak Dimas Arika Mihardja
- Puisi-Puisi Dimas Arika Mihardja
