= Yuri Bezmenov =

Soviet-Canadian journalist and defector (1939–1993)

- Юрий Безменов
- Bezmenov, c. 1986
- Born: Yuri Alexandrovich Bezmenov; December 11, 1939; Mytishchi, Russian SFSR, Soviet Union
- Died: January 5, 1993 (aged 53); Windsor, Ontario, Canada
- Other name: Tomas David Schuman
- Citizenship: Soviet Union (until 1969); Canada
- Education: Moscow State University; University of Toronto
- Occupations: KGB agent (alleged); journalist; author
- Years active: 1963–1986
- Employers: KGB (alleged); Novosti Press Agency (APN); CBC
- Known for: Accusations of Soviet infiltration of, and active measures (subversion) against USA
- Notable work: Various lecture tapes; Love Letter to America
- Movement: Anti-communism
- Spouse: 2
- Children: 3

Yuri Alexandrovich Bezmenov (Russian: Ю́рий Алекса́ндрович Безме́нов; December 11, 1939 – January 5, 1993; alias: Tomas David Schuman) was a Soviet journalist for Novosti Press Agency (APN). In 1970, as a member of the Soviet mission in New Delhi, India, Bezmenov defected to the West and was re-settled in Canada pursuant to an arrangement between US and Canadian security agencies.

Bezmenov is best remembered for his anti-Marxist, anti-Soviet lectures and books published in the 1980s.

== Early life (1939–1963) ==
Bezmenov was born in 1939 in Mytishchi, near Moscow, to Russian parents. Bezmenov stated that his father was a high ranking Soviet Army officer, later put in charge of inspecting Soviet troops in foreign countries, such as the Mongolian People's Republic and Cuba. Bezmenov's father died in the 1970s. When Bezmenov was seventeen, he entered the Institute of Oriental Languages. In addition to languages, he studied history, literature, and music, and became an expert on Indian culture. During his second year, Bezmenov sought to look like a person from India; his teachers encouraged this because graduates of the school were employed abroad as diplomats, journalists or spies.

Bezmenov later alleged that he was required as a Soviet student to take compulsory military training in which he was taught how to play "strategic war games" using the maps of foreign countries, as well as how to interrogate prisoners of war.

== Life in India (1963–1970) ==
After graduating in 1963, Bezmenov spent two years in India working as a translator and public relations officer with the Soviet economic aid group Soviet Refineries Constructions, which built refinery complexes.

In 1965, Bezmenov was recalled to Moscow and began to work for Novosti Press Agency as an apprentice. Bezmenov later alleged that about three quarters of Novosti's staff were actually KGB officers, with the remainder being co-opted or KGB freelance writers and informers like himself. Bezmenov also stated that he edited and planted propaganda materials in foreign media, and delegations of Novosti's guests from foreign countries on tours of the Soviet Union or to international conferences held in the Soviet Union.

Bezmenov later alleged that after several months he was forced to act as an informer while maintaining his position as a Novosti journalist, and used his journalistic duties to help gather information and to spread disinformation to foreign countries for the purposes of Soviet propaganda and subversion.

Bezmenov was once again assigned to India in 1969, this time as a Soviet press officer. He continued Novosti's propaganda efforts in New Delhi, working in the Soviet embassy.

During that period, Bezmenov became dissatisfied with the Soviet system. He then began careful planning to defect to the West.

== Defection to the West and life in Canada (1970–1983) ==
According to a statement provided to the Delhi Police by the Soviet embassy, on February 8, 1970, Bezmenov was set to see a screening of the American film The Incident with two of his colleagues. However, it was reported by them at the time that he had not bought his ticket, and he told them he would join them in a moment and try to purchase one from a scalper outside the theater. Bezmenov did not return to the theater. Instead, Bezmenov put on hippie clothes, complete with a beard and wig, before joining a tour group. By these means, he escaped to Athens, Greece. His defection was reported in the United States, with Soviet sources stating he was "not important" and did "clerical work". After contacting the American embassy and undergoing extensive interviews with United States intelligence, the Central Intelligence Agency (CIA) was able to help Bezmenov seek asylum in Canada, granted by the administration of Pierre Trudeau. The CIA and the Royal Canadian Mounted Police (RCMP) assigned him a new name and identity for reasons of safety. In order to save face with the embarrassment of defection of a Soviet agent, the Delhi residency officially reported he had been abducted, and his son, his closest surviving relative, was given financial compensation.

After studying political science at the University of Toronto for two years, and working on an Ontario farm for three years, in 1973, Bezmenov was hired by the Canadian Broadcasting Corporation in Montreal, broadcasting to the Soviet Union as part of the CBC's International Service. This is when he met his second wife, Tess. In 1976, Bezmenov left the CBC. He later alleged that he was fired at Trudeau’s request after the Soviet ambassador to Canada phoned Trudeau to complain about Bezmenov’s Russian-language broadcasts. After the CBC, he began free-lance journalism. He became a consultant for Almanac Panorama of the World Information Network. Again, Bezmenov alleged that the KGB and the Soviet ambassador to Canada persuaded Trudeau to have him removed from that position.

== Pro-American literature and lectures (Los Angeles, 1981–1986) ==
As I mentioned before, exposure to true information does not matter anymore. A person who is demoralized is unable to assess true information. The facts tell him nothing, even if I shower him with information, with authentic proof, with documents and pictures ... he will refuse to believe it ... That's the tragedy of the situation of demoralization.

— Yuri Bezmenov, 1983

He moved to Los Angeles in the 1980s. In 1983, at a lecture in Los Angeles, Bezmenov expressed the opinion that he "wouldn't be surprised" if the Soviet Union had shot down Korean Air Lines Flight 007 in order to kill Larry McDonald, an anti-communist Democratic member of the United States House of Representatives.

In 1984, he gave an interview to G. Edward Griffin in which he stated that the KGB wanted the political system of the United States to gradually be subverted and alluded to methods that they were supposedly using.

The main emphasis of the KGB is not in the area of intelligence at all. Only about 15% of time, money, and manpower is spent on espionage and such. The other 85% is a slow process which we call either ideological subversion or active measures ... or psychological warfare.

Under the cover name assigned to him by the Canadian RCMP, Tomas D. Schuman, Bezmenov authored the book Love Letter to America. The author's biography of the book states that Bezmenov lived a life similar to Winston Smith, from George Orwell's Nineteen Eighty-Four. Other books by Bezmenov are: No Novosti Is Good News, World Thought Police, Black Is Beautiful, Communism Is Not.

In 1984, the Washington Post reported Bezmenov publicly denounced admission of a Soviet cruise ship to Los Angeles during the 1984 Summer Olympics, stating that they were placed there under the guise of entertainment, but maintained electronic surveillance equipment aboard to monitor radio and telephone communications. In another interview, Bezmenov said the KGB would carry out espionage during the Games and work "against possible athletic defections."

== Later years and death (1986–1993) ==
In 1989, he and his second wife divorced. That same year he moved to Windsor, Ontario, while she stayed in Montreal. Two years later, he began teaching international relations at the University of Windsor. In late December 1992, Bezmenov visited Tess and their children in Montreal for Christmas. Two weeks later, Bezmenov's death was reported on January 6, 1993. According to the Windsor Star, he died of a "massive heart attack following a life-long fight with alcoholism", on Tuesday, January 5, 1993.

== Legacy ==
Since his death, Bezmenov's "Soviet subversion model" (Note: Demoralization (15–20 years) Destabilization (2–5 years) Crisis (2–6 months) Normalization ("indefinite")) has been studied and interpreted by faculty and staff at the Joint Special Operations University (JSOU) in the US to analyze historical events, including the decade-long Russian campaign that preceded the 2008 Russo-Georgian War. His work has also been cited by senior director of UPenn's Penn Biden Center for Diplomacy and Global Engagement, and former Deputy Assistant Secretary of Defense, Michael R. Carpenter. His lectures have also been used by Yale senior lecturer Asha Rangappa, to illustrate the concept of active measures in the Soviet Union's disinformation campaigns in the United States.

On August 19, 2020, Bezmenov's 1984 interview discussing active measures with conspiracy theorist G. Edward Griffin was used in the teaser for the video game Call of Duty: Black Ops Cold War, in addition to its use in the main introduction on August 26. This in part has contributed to a renewed interest in both Bezmenov's work and lectures.

=== Disputes over political affiliation, and conspiracy theories ===
Bezmenov's audiences have included American far-right and anti-communist movements, to whom he often gave speeches and lectures on their platforms. One of such is his interview with conspiracy theorist G. Edward Griffin. Bezmenov himself was involved with the anti-communist and far-right Unification Church and the John Birch Society.

When questioned about his association with the John Birch Society and the doubts raised about his allegiance, he responded "I'm not a member. I don't agree with everything they say", and stated that he resorted to right-wing platforms as a result of mainstream media outlets refusing to provide him with a platform, such as The New York Times.

Clips from his interviews and lectures have been used to promote conspiracy theories about COVID-19 and vaccination mandates and alleged Communist infiltration of Western academia, public/private sectors and governments.

== Works ==
=== Books ===
- Love Letter to America. Los Angeles, CA: W.I.N. Almanac Panorama (1984). ISBN 978-0-93509013-0. OCLC 19468210.
- Black is Beautiful, Communism is Not. Los Angeles, CA: N.A.T.A. Almanac (1985). ISBN 978-0-93509018-5. OCLC 62325386.
- The following excerpts are from a talk on disinformation in the liberal media, given March 26 at a CAUSA USA Regional Conference in Atlanta, Georgia.
  - No "Novosti" is Good News. Los Angeles, CA: Almanac (1985). ISBN 978-0-93509017-8. OCLC 45013143.
  - World Thought Police. Los Angeles, CA: N.A.T.A. Almanac (1986). OCLC 1124779975.

=== Films ===
- Soviet Subversion of the Free Press: A Conversation with Yuri Bezmenov. Interview by G. Edward Griffin. Westlake Village, CA: American Media (1984). OCLC 45810551.

=== Audio ===
- Soviet Ideological Subversion of America in Four Stages: Elizabeth Clare Prophet interviews Tomas Schuman, Novosti Press, Soviet Defector. Malibu, CA: Summit University (1984). Incl. 3 audiocassettes, handouts. OCLC 25714330. "The flame of freedom speaks at Summit University forum."

== See also ==
- List of KGB defectors
- List of Soviet and Eastern Bloc defectors
