= Nusantara Society =

- Established: 1990
- Chairman: Sikorsky V. V.
- Location: Moscow, Russia

The Nusantara Society (Russian: Общество «Нусантара») is a Russian non-profit learned society for research fellows, professors, lecturers, students and postgraduates of Moscow and St. Petersburg academic institutions, universities and higher schools, studying the vast region of Nusantara, populated by peoples speaking Austronesian languages. Nusantara includes Brunei Darussalam, Indonesia, Malaysia, Philippines, Timor Leste, Madagascar, Oceania, as well as countries where Austronesian minorities are present, such as Singapore, Thailand, Vietnam and Taiwan (Republic of China).

== Short history ==
The society was founded on January 10, 1990, on the basis of the Malay-Indonesian Readings. Later, in June 1998, the Nusantara Research Center was established at the Institute of Asian and African Countries at Moscow State University. The founder and the president of the society till 2004 was Dr. B.B. Parnickel. In 2000 the NS was re-registered. The founders were: Aliyeva N.F., Demidyuk L.N., Dorofeeva T.V., Parnikel B.B., Pogadaev V.A., Sikorsky V.V.

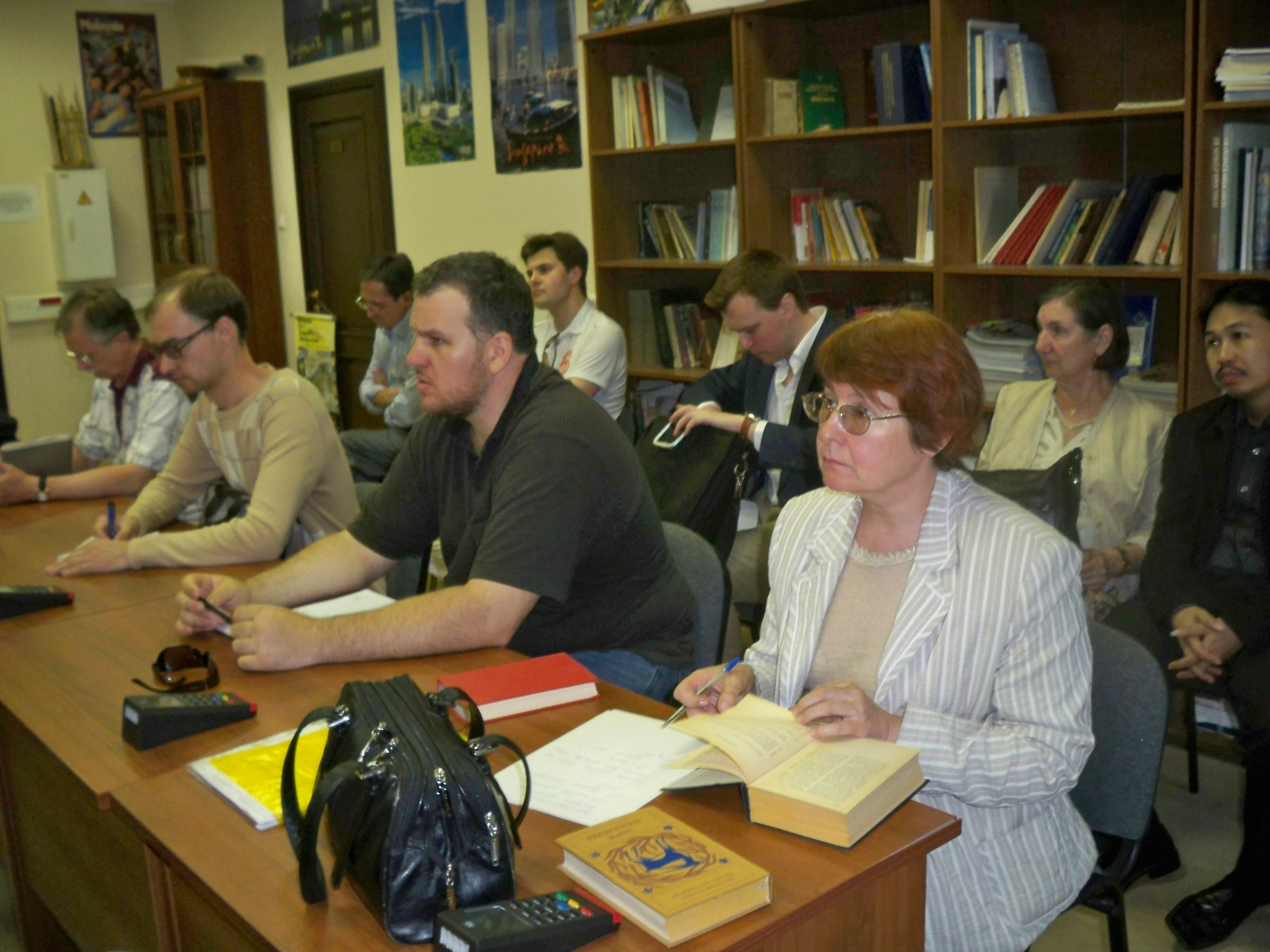
Malay-Indonesian Readings, 6.6.2011

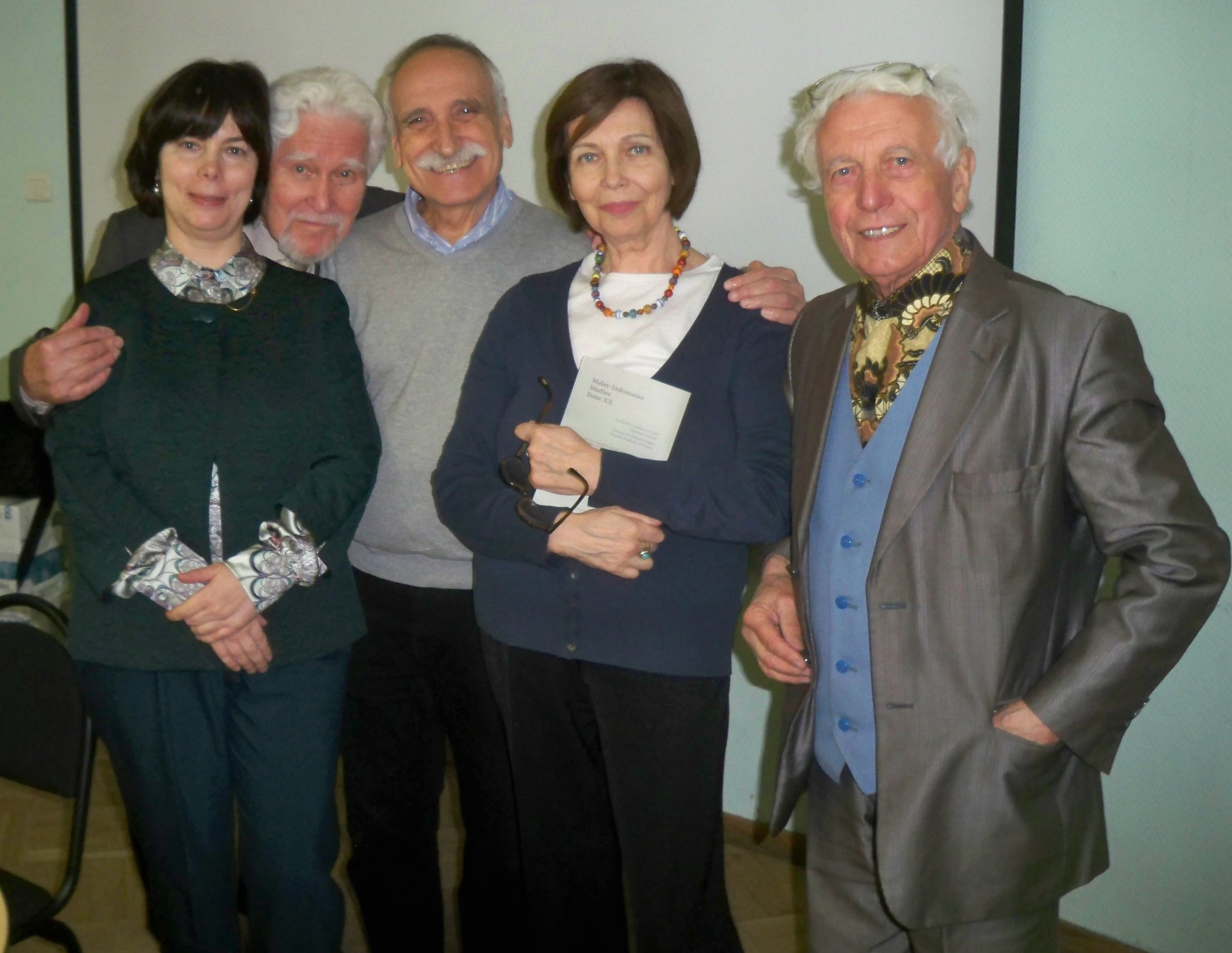
Nusantara Society Activists Dr. E.S. Kukushkina, Dr. V.V. Sikorsky, Dr. V.A. Pogadaev, Dr. L.V. Goriaeva, Dr. N.P. Maletin at the jubilee meeting of the society (Moscow, 4.4.2018)

== The main aims ==
The main aims of the Nusantara Society are as follows:

- To establish contacts with scientific institutions and universities in Nusantara, Europe, the United States, Australia and elsewhere.
- To promote studies and teaching courses on Nusantara as well as teaching the Malay and Indonesian languages, and other Austronesian languages.
- To carry on the exchange of books, periodicals and other materials between Nusantara nations and Russia, to organize all kinds of exhibitions, performances, video and film showings.
- To work out joint research projects and to arrange conferences and seminars.
- To encourage the research work of postgraduates and students and to facilitate the probation of Russian specialists, postgraduates and students abroad.

Malay-Indonesian Studies, Issue XVIII

== Cooperation with other institutions ==
The Nusantara Society cooperates closely with the Gorky Institute of World Literature under the Russian Academy of Sciences, the Margarita Rudomino All-Russia State Library for Foreign Literature and the Russian State Library, the Faculty of Oriental Studies at Saint Petersburg State University; Leiden University and the Royal Netherlands Institute of Southeast Asian and Caribbean Studies (KITLV) in the Netherlands, the University of Malaya, the Malaysian Institute of Language and Literature (Dewan Bahasa dan Pustaka) and other institutions abroad. A memorandum of understanding was signed with the Malaysian Institute of Language and Literature in 1995.

In December 2017, Nusantara Society celebrated 50th anniversary of the Malay-Indonesian Readings (under the patronage of the academician A.A. Guber) which became the basis for the Nusantara Society. April 4, 2018, the 20th issue of the collection Malay-Indonesian studies was launched at the jubilee meeting of the society.

The Nusantara Society is also engaged in publishing. Its publications include the Malay-Indonesian Studies Series (partly based on seminar papers) and miscellaneous studies on Nusantara culture (in cooperation with Saint Petersburg University). Up until 2019 there were 21 issues of Malay-Indonesian Studies.

== Board (2025) ==
- President: Professor Dr. Vilen V. Sikorsky (Higher Courses in Foreign Languages of Ministry of Foreign Affairs (Russia))
- Vice-president: Assoc. Professor Dr. Victor A. Pogadaev (Diplomatic Academy of the Ministry of Foreign Affairs of the Russian Federation)
- Vice-president: Senior Researcher Dr. Eugenia S. Kukushkina (Gorky Institute of World Literature)
- Secretary-Coordinator Assoc. Professor Dr. Ekaterina A. Baklanova (Institute of Asian and African Countries)

=== Members ===
- Research Fellow Dr. Anton O. Zakharov (Institute of Oriental Studies of the Russian Academy of Sciences)
- Senior Researcher Dr. Marc Yu. Ulianov (Gorky Institute of World Literature)
- Senior Researcher Dr. Maria Yu. Stanyukovich (Museum of Anthropology and Ethnography)
- Assoc. Professor Dr. Marina V. Frolova (Institute of Asian and African Countries)

Honorary members of the society are Malaysian poets Datuk Dr. Kemala (since November 22, 2017) and Dr. Siti Zainon Ismail (since January 1, 2020).
