= Rancage Literary Award =

Indonesian literary award

The Rancage Literary Award is a prize given to people who are considered to have contributed to the development of language and literature. This award is given by Rancage Cultural Foundation, which was founded by humanists Ajip Rosidi, Erry Riyana Harjapamekas, Edi S. Ekajati, and some other figures.

In the beginning (1989 to 1993), the only literary prizes include literary, but then this award is also given to the literary world of Java (since 1994), Bali literature (since 1998), and Lampung literature (since 2008). In 1990, Literary Gifts Rancage into two, namely to work published in the form of books and for services for those (individuals or institutions) who contributed to the development of language and literature in the area. Since 1993, this award also comes with Samsudi Gifts, which is a special award to the author of books Sundanese-speaking children.
