= Sakmara (rural locality) =

Sakmara Сакмара
- selo
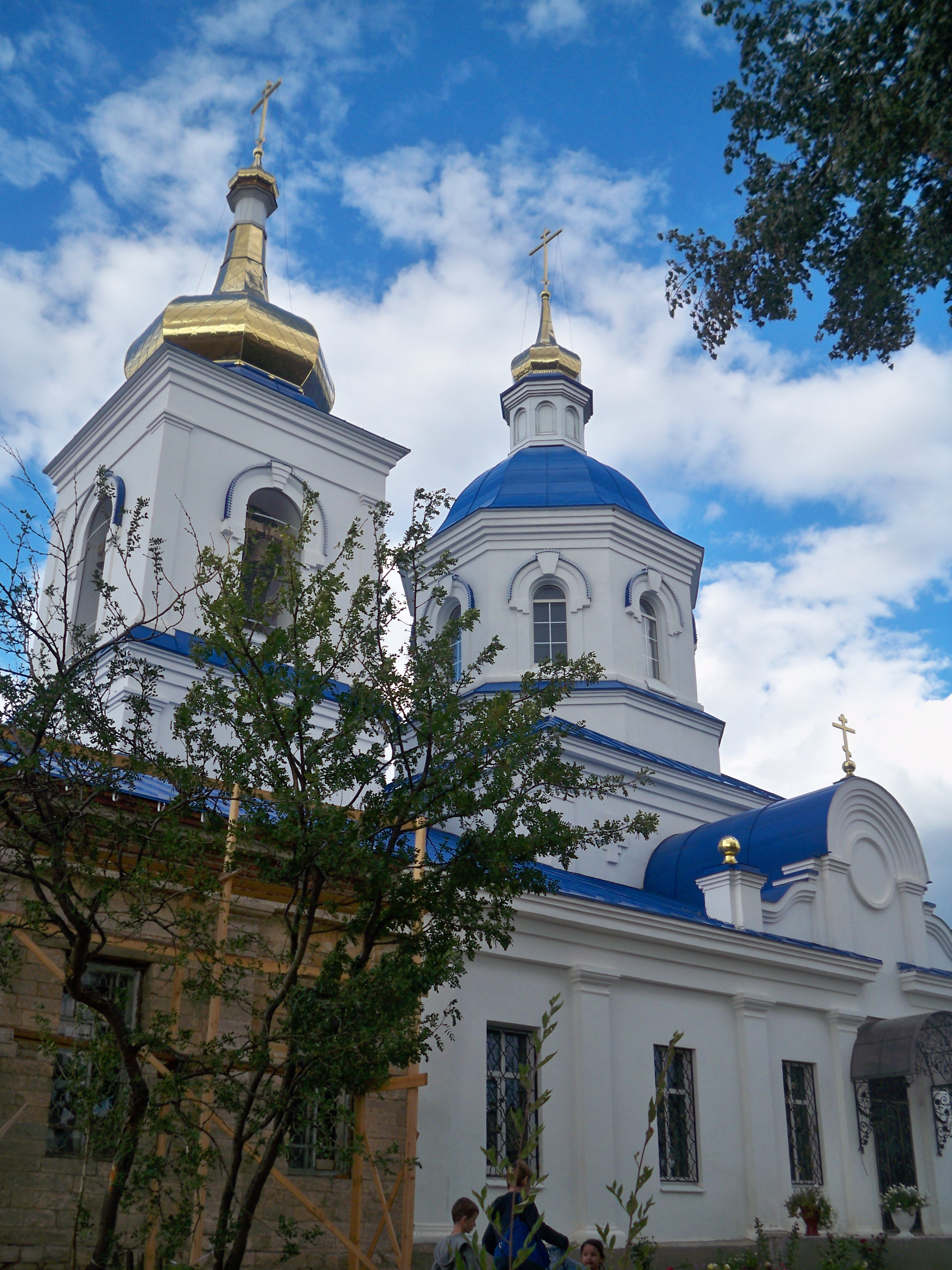
- The Church of the Kazan Icon of the Mother of God.

- Location within Orenburg Oblast Location within Russia
- Coordinates: 51°59′N 55°19′E
- Country: Russia
- Region: Orenburg Oblast
- District: Sakmarsky District
- Time zone: [[UTC+5:00]]

Sakmara (Russian: Сакмара; Bashkir: Һаҡмар, Haqmar) is a rural locality (a selo), the administrative center of Sakmarsky District in Orenburg Oblast, Russia. Located on the banks of the Sakmara river.

== Short history ==
It was founded officially in 1725 as a Cossack settlement (the original name was Sakmarsky Gorodok) but earlier in the late 17th century there was already there a Russian settlement founded by Old Believers refugees which was destroyed by the Bashkirs around 1710. Sakmara was the first Russian settlement in the area that existed before the founding of the city of Orenburg.

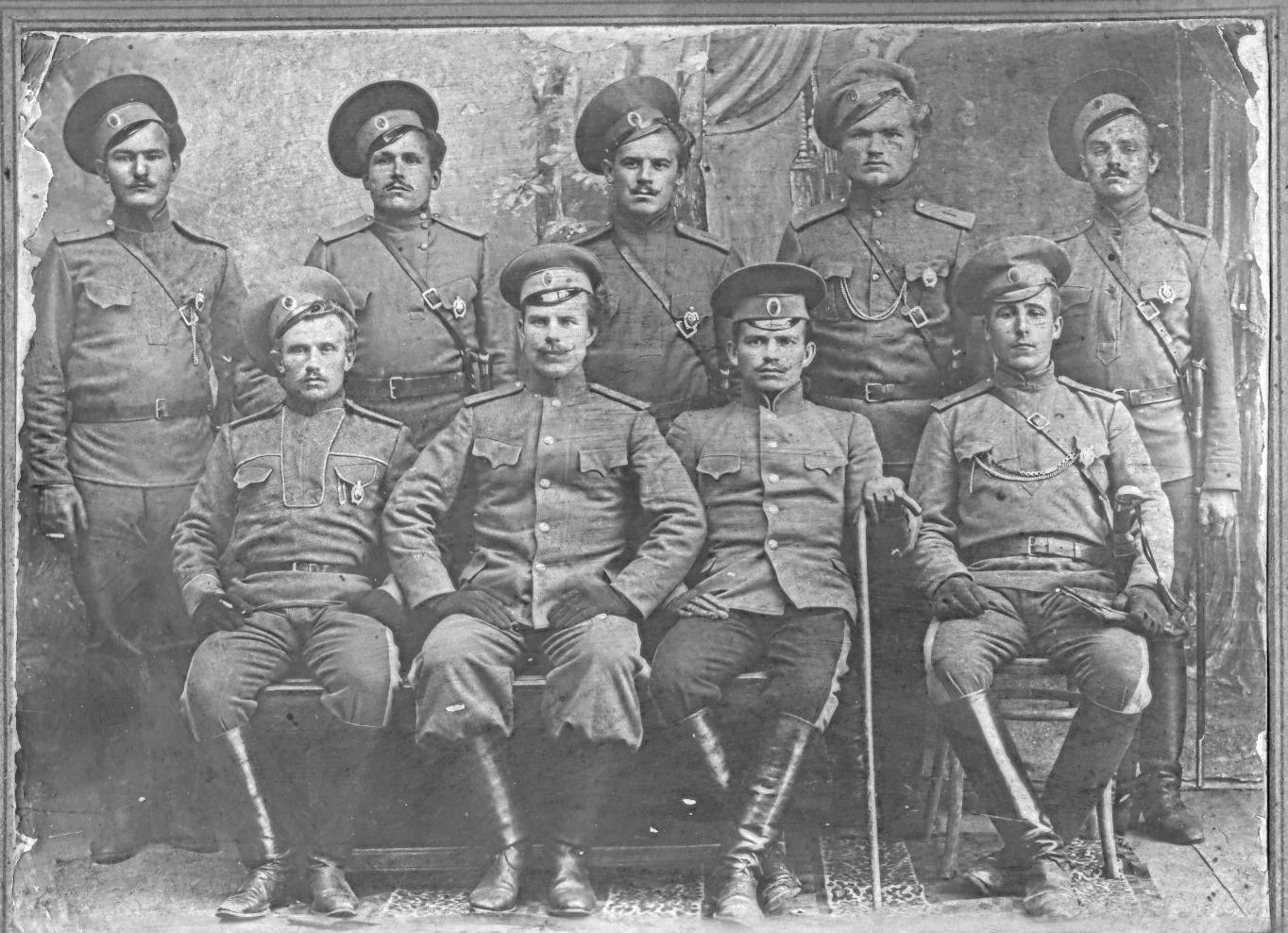
A group of Yaik (Orenburg) Cossacks from Sakmara settlement (1912). Standing on the left side is Alexander Mertemianovich Pogadaev

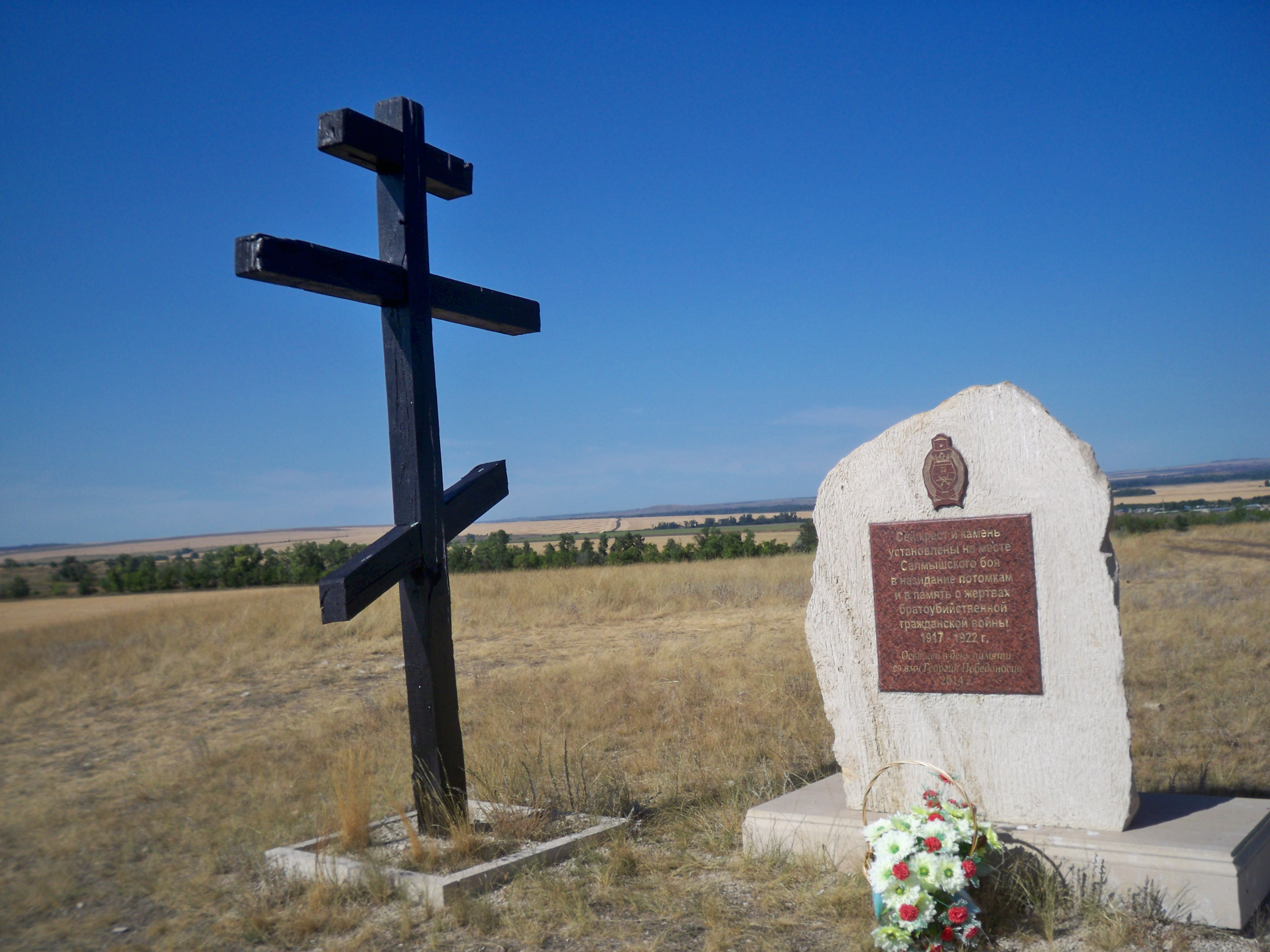
A memorable place where the Orenburg and Orsk regiments in the battle on the Salmysh River defeated the troops of Kolchak: Mount Yangiz, near Sakmara

Sakmara Cossacks participated in wars with Sweden in 1700-1721, with Turkey in 1735-1739, Prussia in 1756-1763, etc.

Among the Cossacks there were many Old Believers. During the peasant uprising of 1773-1775 they did not oppose its leader Yemelyan Pugachev. Here was one of the famous battles of the Peasants' War described by Alexander Pushkin in his novel The Captain's Daughter (1836). This is how A. S. Pushkin describes Pugachev’s arrival in Sakmarsky gorodok:

... “In the fortress near the village hut, carpets were laid and a table was set up with bread and salt. A priest was waiting for Pugachev with a cross and with holy icons. When he entered the fortress, the bells began to ring; the people took off their hats, and when the impostor began to get off his horse, with the help of two of his Cossacks, who took him by the arms, then all fell on their faces. He kissed the cross, kissed the bread and salt and, sitting on the prepared chair, said: "Get up, children." Then everyone kissed his hand. Pugachev inquired about the city Cossacks. He was told that some were in the service, others with their chieftain, Danil Donskoy, were taken to Orenburg, and that only twenty persons were left for the postal need, but they also disappeared. He turned to the priest and menacingly ordered him to find them, saying: “You are a priest, so be a chieftain; you and all the inhabitants are responsible for me with your own heads. " Then he went to the chieftain 's father, in whose house a dinner was prepared for him. “If your son were here,” he said to the old man, “then your dinner would be big and honest: but your bread and salt is not pure anymore.” What kind of chieftain is he if he left his place? “- After dinner, being drunk, he wanted the host to be executed; but the Cossacks who were with him discouraged him; the old man was only chained and put for one night in a cottage under the guard. The next day, Cossacks who were found were presented to Pugachev. He treated them kindly and took with him. They asked him: how much would he order to take supplies? “Take, he answered, a piece of bread: you will only accompany me to Orenburg.” At this time, the Bashkirs, sent by the Orenburg governor, surrounded the city. Pugachev went to them and, without a fight, took everyone into his army. On the shore of Sakmara he hung six people."

During the Russian Civil War, in April 1919, the 4th Orenburg Cossack Regiment under the command of General Bakich A.S. defended the area of the Arkhipov Farm against the 277th Regiment of the Red Army. After the four-hour battle between the mouth of the rivers Salmysh and Sakmara known as Salmysh Battle Sakmara was occupied by the Reds.

== Modern situation ==
In 1935-1963 and since 1965, Sakmara is the administrative center of Sakmarsky District. The population is 5030 (2010).

There are a secondary school, a kindergarten, a Palace of Culture, a Sport Centre, a hospital, a mosk and the Church of the Kazan Icon of the Mother of God.
