= Institute of Asian and African Countries =

Academic institution under Moscow State University

Coordinates: 55.7554°N 37.6118°E

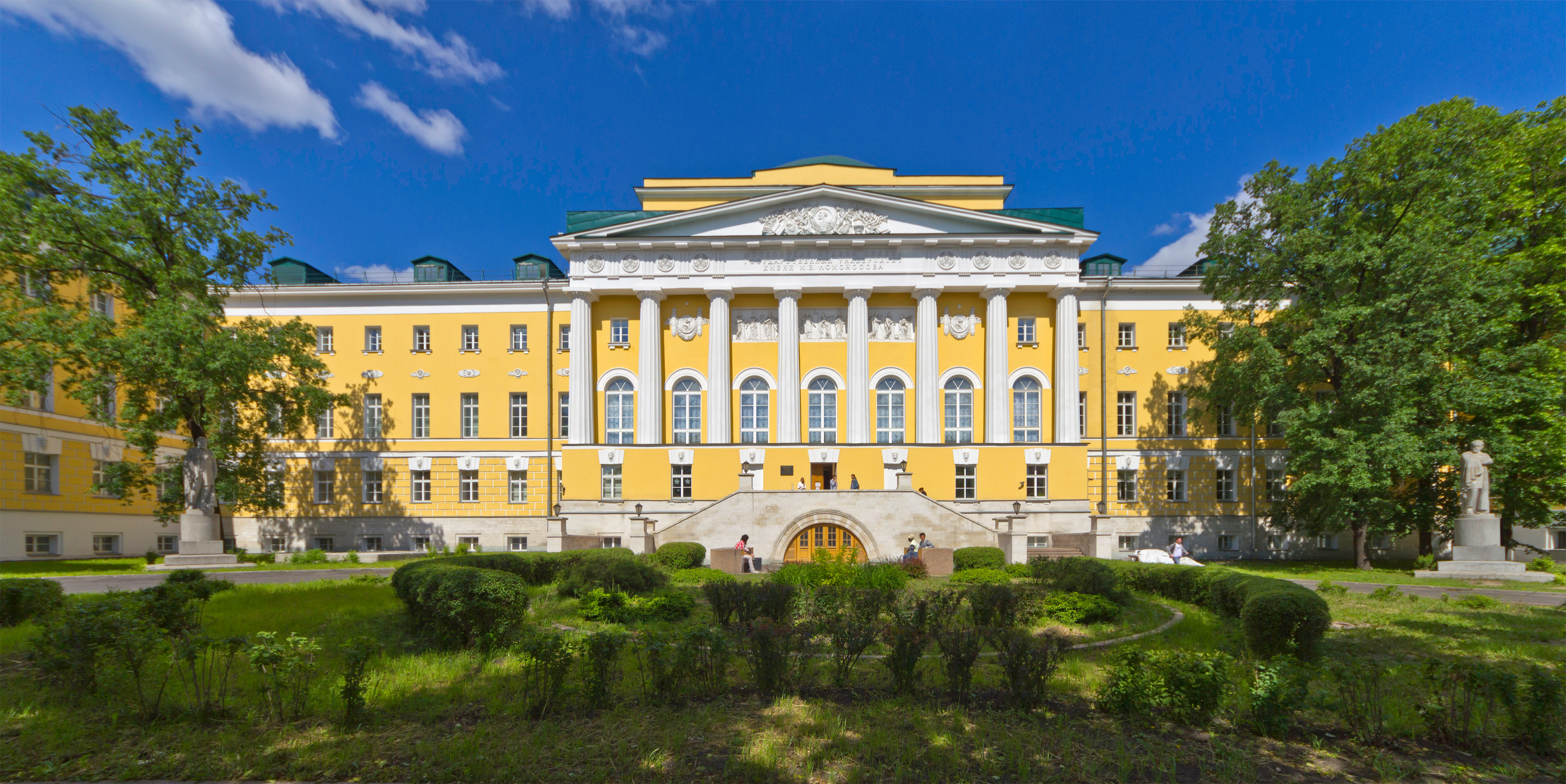
Institute of Asian and African Studies

The Institute of Asian and African Studies (Russian: Институт стран Азии и Африки) at Lomonosov Moscow State University was founded in 1956 as the Institute of Oriental Languages and was renamed to the Institute of Asian and African Countries in 1972. It is a Russian Centre for Oriental Studies. It employs more than 250 members including 28 professors and 70 assistant professors. Many of them are authors of studies, text-books and dictionaries for their translations of Japanese, Chinese, Sanskrit, Arabic, Hindi, Persian, Malay, Swahili and other Asian and African texts of fiction. Nowadays many Asian and African languages are taught in the Institute including Indonesian, Chinese, Japanese, Korean, Vietnamese, Filipino, Thai, Mongolian, Arabic, Sinhalese, Turkish, Hebrew, Urdu, Sanskrit, Swahili, Hausa, Amharic, Afrikaans, Fula and Zulu.

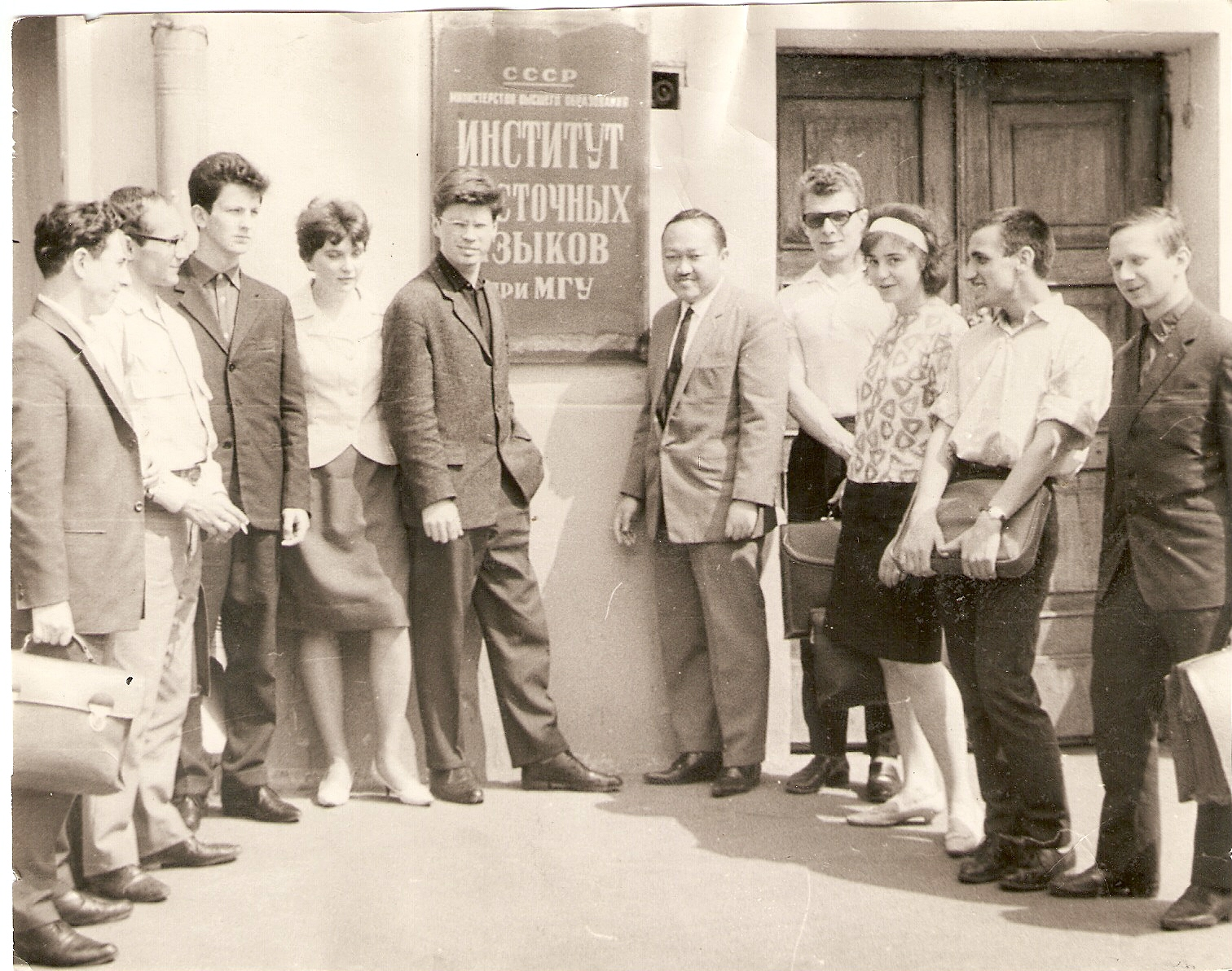
Students at the entrance to the institute, 1967

The graduates of the Institute get a diploma in "Oriental and African Studies" with a specialization in philology, political science, history or economics. The staff of the Institute has worked out the syllabus and text books on History of Asian and African countries and on Oriental Literature as well as books on languages, history, ethnology, geography and economics of the certain regions. More than 40 oriental and West-European languages are being taught at the Institute.

The Institute partners with many other educational institutions internationally. Its partners in Malaysia include the Sultan Idris Education University, Universiti Sains Malaysia, and the Academy of Malay Studies at the University of Malaya.

== Directors ==
- Smirnov N.A. (1956–1958)
- Kovalev A. A. (1958–1975)
- Akhramovich R. T. (1975–1989)
- Meliksetov A. V. (1989–1994)
- Meier M. S. (1994–2012)
- Acting director: Abylgaziev I.I. (2013–2021)
- Acting director: Maslov A. A. (2021–present)

== Notable alumni ==
- Boris Akunin
- Dmitry Peskov
- Vladimir Zhirinovsky
- Yuri Bezmenov
- Igor Morgulov
- Andrey Fursov
