= Town Boy =

Autobiographical graphic novel by Lat

- Front cover of the eleventh reprint (1997)
- Author: Lat
- Language: English, with a little bit of Malay, Cantonese and Tamil
- Genre: Autobiographical comic
- Publisher: Berita Publishing
- Publication date: August 1981
- Publication place: Malaysia
- Media type: Print
- Pages: 190 pp (first edition)
- ISBN: 967-969-402-X
- OCLC: 849821079
- Dewey Decimal: 741.59595
- Preceded by: The Kampung Boy
- Followed by: Kampung Boy: Yesterday and Today

Town Boy is a graphic novel by Lat that revolves on Lat's teenage years in Ipoh during the 1960s, including his school days, his friendship with Frankie, a Chinese boy who lives in a shop house, as well as the search for his love as the book's main themes which ends with Lat's last meeting with Frankie at the before the latter departs to United Kingdom to pursue his A-Level.

Published in August 1981 by Berita Publishing, it is a sequel to The Kampung Boy (1979) and was a commercial and critical success. Narrated in English with a smattering of Malay, Cantonese and Tamil, the book has been translated into other languages, such as Japanese and French, and sold abroad. This book along with its predecessor, The Kampung Boy, has been reprinted many times in the country and abroad, it was then followed by its spin-off, Kampung Boy: Yesterday and Today (1993).

== Plot ==
Following events in The Kampung Boy, 10-year old Mat resumes his studies away from family at a boarding school in Ipoh, the state capital of Perak. However, his residency at the boarding school only lasts a year, as his family would also relocate to Ipoh, settling in a low-cost housing estate in the suburb of Sungai Rokam, courtesy of a Perak state government grant scheme for villagers from satellite settlements within the Kinta Valley region.

Mat regularly explores Ipoh with younger brother Rahman, describing it as the cleanest in the country (a title which it held non-consecutively alongside George Town, Penang), and excited by the hustle and bustle of the city. At 13, Mat continues his secondary school studies at Anderson School, where he befriends a Chinese boy named Frankie and exchanges stories about their lives and interests.

After school, Frankie invites Mat to a shophouse in town where the former's family operates a kopitiam on the ground floor and lives on the floor above. While feasting on baos, Frankie shows Mat his family's radiogram and vinyl record collection (a luxury that Mat had not experienced before due to his family's lower income), and they dance to "Rock Around the Clock". The next day, Mat and Frankie go out together ostensibly to go to the library, but actually head to the Jubilee Park amusement centre where they watch women dancing by a vending machine and are consequently chased away by the security guard. On another occasion, Mat and Frankie participate in a school marathon, but are confronted by the headmaster and discipline teacher for straying off the designated path, crossing the Kinta River via bridge instead of swimming across the river as per the event's rules.

Later into their teenage years, while walking around in Ipoh, Mat and Frankie encountered Normah. The two of them, along with their other friends, headed into town to watch a movie. However, they realize that they get less attention. After that, they attended an art education class under the guidance of Mr. Lee. Mat and Frankie and the other students drew pictures of naked women. Not long after, they had a drink at a coffee shop in town and saw Normah again. Frankie tries to talking to Normah and her friend, but they ignored, then laughed at by his friends. Mat and another friend, Lingam joined the school cadet band where Mat played the flute. They played two songs, "Sedia Berkhidmat" and "Obla Di Obla Da".

Mat and Frankie then attend a youth party and dance with the guests present including their friends. A few days later, Mat participates in a school band performance with Minister of Education Khir Johari in attendance. Normah meets Mat to ask for help to improve her painting technique, they then eat together at a restaurant. After eating, Mat and Normah took a walk while sharing their opinions. They was observed from a distance by Frankie and their friends. Mat and Frankie then watch a movie together. One day, Mat receives a letter from Frankie, learning that Frankie is due to leave the country for London to pursue A-level studies. Lat rushes to the Ipoh railway station, arriving just in time to exchange parting words and goodbyes with Frankie before his departure. Realizing that he has lost a friend he has known since his early school days, Mat leaves the station without any single words.

== Conception ==
Like The Kampung Boy, Town Boy is also an autobiography. The stories in the book are a collection of memories of the author, Lat about his teenage years in Ipoh, about the "days before [he] moved to the capital city to venture into life as an adult....and later a professional doodler". Lat grew up in a kampung and moved to the city after graduating from high school. He worked there as a crime reporter and drew cartoons to supplement his income—a hobby he had started at the age of nine. He was sent to the "Special Malay Class" program where he learned to read and write in English. He established close relationships with children of his age from different races and has celebrated the most significant period of his life, which led him to wrote Town Boy. According to Lat, he completed the book's first page on 2 February 1981 by writing "I became a town boy at the age of 10" and he uses his free time and worked hard to completed the book after The Kampung Boy. On 16 February, he has completed 45 pages of the book and submitted them to the then-New Straits Times editor-in-chief, Tan Sri Lee Siew Yee.

For the book, Lat wanted to spread his deep knowledge about music and writing stories about friendship. Frankie, a Chinese boy, represents Lat's friends that made at the time through sharing same interests in music. Apart from that, he also included aspects and characters from his school days at Anderson School. Lat admits that he "feels nostalgic" at that time and the way he narrates also revolves around himself and his friends at that time when he wrote Town Boy. According to him, although Town Boy is based on real events, he refused to convey it specifically about his former alma mater. On 25 June, Lat completed the inner page of Town Boy, followed by the book cover, which features two main characters - Mat and Frankie, standing behind the Tarzan movie poster. (Note: The front cover of the book's subsequent reprints features Mat and Frankie riding a bicycle surrounding the town.)

== Art style and presentation ==
The book's layout is more varied than The Kampung Boy's, featuring "short multi-panel sequences with giant double-page-spread-drawings." Comics artist Seth commented that Lat's drawings are filled with "vigor and raw energy", "entirely based on eccentric stylizations but grounded with an eye capable of wonderfully accurate observation of the real world." At certain points, crowd scenes spread across the pages of the book, filled with "Lat's broadly humorous and humane" characters. Comics journalist Tom Spurgeon said after readings such scenes: "There are times when reading Town Boy feels like watching through a street fair after it rains, everyday existence altered by an event just enough to make everything stand out. You can get lost in the cityscapes."

The Asian characters occasionally speak in their native tongues, their words rendered in Chinese or Tamil glyphs without translations. Goldsmith and Ridzwan did not find the foreign words to be a hindrance in understanding and enjoying the work. Instead, they believed the non-English languages aided Lat's construction of his world as one different from a dominantly English-speaking world. Lat's depiction of Mat's visit to Frankie's home transcends culture, portraying realistically the experiences most children feel when visiting the "foreign but familiar staleness" of their new friend's home. Mat and Frankie's growing friendship is a central theme of the book, and their bond as they enjoy rock-and-roll together in Frankie's house has become a notable scene for readers such as journalist Ridzwan A. Rahim. Art historian, Redza Piyadasa found that "aesthetically, Town Boy is less stunning but it is not without depth and a very detailed observations of environments and character types". Their friendship marks a shift in the story of Mat's life from a focus on his family in The Kampung Boy to a focus beyond. As the book revolves around Mat's friendship with Frankie, it ends with the Chinese boy's departure to the United Kingdom from the Ipoh railway station.

== Adaptations ==
=== United States adaptation ===
The United States adaptation of the book was published in 2007 by First Second Books. Like The Kampung Boy, it was published in a smaller format (6 inches by 8 inches).

=== Theatre staging ===
The novel has been adapted into a theatre staging by renowned playwright Stella Koh and directed by former Anglo Chinese School (ACS) teacher, Ong-Su Ming, who also serves as a producer. The theatre was starring Afdlin Shauki as Lat and Sheila Majid as Normah with ensemble casts consists of ACS students. The music for the theatre was done by Fay Lee Ai Lin with lyrics by Fay and Koh and choreographed by Alan Bligh. Town Boy the Musical was staged from 28 to 30 August 1987.

== Reception and legacy ==
Town Boy was released in August 1981 to popular success. In his memoir Lat: My Life and Cartoons, Lat said that he receives the first three copies of the book on 22 July 1981. To promote the book, Lat goes to Singapore to attend the Singapore Book Fair 1981 at the Singapore World Trade Centre (WTC; now known as HarbourFront Centre) on the same date. The book also made available at Platform One, Ipoh Railway Station on 29 August. As of 2012, Town Boy had been reprinted 21 times. (Note: Specifics of reprint: Town Boy (Twentyfirst reprint ed.). Kuala Lumpur, Malaysia: Berita Publishing. 2012 [1981]. ISBN 978-967-969-402-4.) It has also been translated into French and Japanese. The book alongside its prequel, The Kampung Boy was released in a special edition to coincide with the staging of Lat Kampung Boy Sebuah Muzikal at the Istana Budaya starting 16 March to 3 April 2011 and sold 1,000 copies. Town Boy along with Kampung Boy and Kampung Boy: Yesterday and Today was re-released in 2014 by MPH Publishing.

Reviews of Town Boy were positive. Librarian George Galuschak liked the book for its detailed crowd scenes and its diverse cast of characters—both animal and human. The "energy" in Lat's drawings reminded him of Sergio Aragonés and Matt Groening. Laurel Maury, a reviewer for the Los Angeles Times, likened the book to a Peanuts cartoon, but without the melancholy typical of Charles M. Schulz's work. She said that Lat delivered a "rollicking" world and that his characters' interactions made the story unpretentious and heart-warming. Although Spurgeon believed any single scene in Town Boy was superior to any book from a lesser cartoonist, he preferred the narrower scope of The Kampung Boy; he felt the tighter focus of Lat's first book gave a more personal and deeper insight into the author's growth as a young boy. Town Boy, with its quicker pace, felt to him like a loose collection of heady first-time experiences that failed to explore all possibilities of the encounters. Former New Nation journalist, Sylvia Toh noted that Town Boy is a "recounting of his adolescence in Ipoh" and saw that it "may not be hillarious as his subtitled collections from 1977 to 1978".

== Bibliography ==
Interviews/self-introspectives

- Lat (11 January 2007). "Campbell Interviews Lat: Part 1". First Hand Books—Doodles and Dailies (Interview). Interviewed by Campbell, Eddie. New York, United States: First Second Books. Archived from the original on 23 June 2008.
- Lat (12 January 2007). "Campbell Interviews Lat: Part 2". First Hand Books—Doodles and Dailies (Interview). Interviewed by Eddie Campbell. New York, United States: First Second Books. Archived from the original on 23 June 2008.
- Lat (15 January 2007). "Campbell Interviews Lat: Part 3". First Hand Books—Doodles and Dailies (Interview). Interviewed by Eddie Campbell. New York, United States: First Second Books. Archived from the original on 23 June 2008.

Books

- Redza Piyadasa (1994). "Lat, the Cartoonist – An Appreciation and Tribute". Lat: 30 Years Later. Petaling Jaya, Selangor: Kampung Boy. pp. 39–60. ISBN 983-996-174-8.
- Redza Piyadasa (2003). "Lat the Cartoonist—An Appreciation". Pameran Retrospektif Lat [Retrospective Exhibition 1964–2003]. Kuala Lumpur, Malaysia: Balai Seni Lukis Negara. pp. 84–99. ISBN 983-9572-71-7.
- Seth (2006). Forty Cartoon Books of Interest: From the Collection of the Cartoonist "Seth". California, United States: Buenaventura Press.
- Lat; Syed Nadzri Syed Harun (2016). Lat: My Life and Cartoons. Editions Didier Millet. ISBN 9789671061756.

Academic sources

- Galuschak, George (2008). "Lat. Town Boy". Kliatt. 42 (2). Massachusetts, United States: 32. ISSN 1065-8602.
- Goldsmith, Francisca (1 September 2007). "Town Boy". Booklist. Vol. 104, no. 1. Illinois, United States: American Library Association. p. 109. ISSN 0006-7385. ProQuest 235538164.
- Haslina Haroon (2008). "The Adaptation of Lat's The Kampung Boy for the American Market". Membina Kepustakaan Dalam Bahasa Melayu. International Conference on Translation. Vol. 11. Kuala Lumpur, Malaysia: Institut Terjemahan Negara Malaysia. pp. 537–549. ISBN 978-983-192-438-9.
- Lent, John (April 1999). "The Varied Drawing Lots of Lat, Malayasian Cartoonist". The Comics Journal (211). Washington, United States: Fantagraphics Books: 35–39. ISSN 0194-7869. Archived from the original on 15 February 2005.

Journalistic sources

- Ridzwan A. Rahim (31 August 2008). "Here's the Lat-est". New Straits Times. Kuala Lumpur, Malaysia: New Straits Times Press. p. 2. ProQuest ID: 1545672011.
- "Top 10 Influential Celebrities in Malaysia: Stars with the X-factor Sizzle". AsiaOne. Singapore: Singapore Press Holdings. New Straits Times. 7 September 2009. Archived from the original on 18 August 2010.
- "Lat's Latest". New Straits Times. Kuala Lumpur, Malaysia: New Straits Times Press. 18 March 1998. p. 7. ProQuest 266347448.
- Willmott, Jennifer Rodrigo (March 1989). "Malaysia's Favourite Son". Reader's Digest. Vol. 134, no. 803. New York, United States: The Reader's Digest Association. ISSN 0034-0375. Archived from the original on 18 August 2010.
- "Meet Lat in person". New Straits Times. 29 August 1981. p. 20.
- "Lat wows them at railway station". New Sunday Times. 30 August 1981. p. 1.
- "Peluang temu Lat". Berita Harian Singapura. 5 September 1981. p. 2.
- "The kampung boy comes to town". New Nation. 4 September 1981. p. 20.
- Sylvia Toh (6 September 1981). "Town Boy has such a Lat of lovely details". New Nation. p. 26.
- "Well, it was Lat this..." The Straits Times. 29 August 1981. p. 40.
- Redza Piyadasa (31 August 1986). "Lat brings message of hope, friendship for true Malaysians". New Straits Times.
- Anne Haslam (22 August 1987). "Lat's 'Town Boy' goes musical". New Straits Times. p. 10.
- "From kampung boy to world-renowned artist". The Straits Times. 17 October 2007.
- Anitha Kandavel (10 January 2019). "10 lesser known facts about Lat". EdgeProp.
- "Jual 1,000 naskhah edisi terhad 2 buku Lat". Harian Metro. 14 March 2011.
- "1,000 set edisi khas karya Lat dijual". Berita Harian. 14 March 2011.
- "Lat's latest compilation now out as 'Forever Lat'". The Star Online. 31 August 2014. Archived from the original on 4 September 2014.
- Rizal Solomon (11 November 2009). "Town Boy comes of age". New Straits Times.
- "A Malaysian story". The Edge Malaysia. 23 March 2011.
- Azalea Azuar (20 August 2019). "Professional doodlers were a joke, Lat says". The Malaysian Reserve.

Online sites

- Maury, Laurel (26 December 2007). "Lat's Rollicking Malaysian Childhood". Jacket Copy. Los Angeles, United States: Los Angeles Times. Archived from the original on 18 August 2010.
- Spurgeon, Tom (20 July 2007). "CR Review: Town Boy". The Comics Reporter. New Mexico, United States: Self-published. Archived from the original on 13 October 2007.
