= Kampung Boy: Yesterday and Today =

Autobiographical graphic novel by Lat

- Front cover of the 1993 first print
- Author: Lat
- Language: English
- Genre: Autobiographical comic
- Publisher: Berita Publishing
- Publication date: 16 January 1993
- Publication place: Malaysia
- Media type: Print
- Pages: 148 pp (first edition)
- OCLC: 932559358
- Dewey Decimal: 741.59595
- Preceded by: Town Boy

Kampung Boy: Yesterday and Today is a graphic novel by Lat that retells Lat's childhood as depicted in The Kampung Boy (1979), but this time focusing on the leisure time and activities practiced by the cartoonist's family and friends. The book sees Lat once again using the setting of The Kampung Boy to compare and contrast the differences between Malaysian childhood experiences in the 1950s and 1980s. Published and released on 16 January 1993 by Berita Publishing, it was a spin-off of The Kampung Boy and was a commercial and critical success. A Japanese edition of the book was published in 1998.

== Plot ==
Kampung Boy: Yesterday and Today began with a colour sketches of present day Malaysia with Lat narrates his past experience of being grew up in modern kampung house while believes that there are still many kampungs in Malaysia that anyone can visit. He then narrated that there was no television, shopping malls, computer games, terrace houses or public transport and also no casual clothes for children at that time.

He then flipped to black-and-white sketches that shows him standing outside his house that was given to his father by his paternal grandfather. The first toy he played was a wheel attached on a stick made by his father where he ran around with the toy everyday. By the fruit season, Lat along with his friends spend a long time sitting up on trees. He then revealed that hide and seek was the first game he played with other kids of his age, then followed by upih pinang race. After a long play, he came home and eats a "tumbung" inside the coconut. Later on, he along with his friends and other kampung folks went to watch a movie at night. Back to the present day, Lat drives his car to take his children to school.

== Conception ==
Kampung Boy: Yesterday and Today is Lat's 17th comic books. Like its predecessors, the book is also an autobiography. For the book, Lat refocused on the leisure time and activities during his early years rather than telling the entire story of his early life. He used watercolour sketches to separate the present from the past which used black and white sketches. He also compares the standard of living among children in the 1990s with the past and recalls how simple the joys of his childhood, before the advent of television, shopping malls and computer games. This book, according to Lat, is his legacy to his four children with his wife, Faezah Ahmad Zanzali. His goal for the book was to "tell his own children how much better it was in the old days." Yesterday and Today is one of two comic books by Lat to have watercolour sketches, the other being Lat and His Lot Again!, which was published in 1983.

== Art style and presentation ==
Yesterday and Today contrasts scenes between two time periods such as how a child learns to swim in the 1990s (left) and the 1950s (right) as humorous commentaries.

Like in The Kampung Boy, the scenes in Yesterday and Today are presented in great detail. Lat shows the children playing with items constructed from simple items found in the household and nature. He also illustrates the toys' schematics. He compares the games with their modern counterparts, lamenting the loss of creativity in modern youths. Other comments on societal changes are in the book. A child is taking a swimming lesson in a pool, intently watched by his parents who have a maid in tow with various items in her hands. While the parents gesticulate wildly at their son, the lifeguard and instructor calmly sit by the pool, watching the boy's smooth progress. This scene is contrasted with Lat's own experience at the hands of his father, who casually tosses the terrified boy into a river, letting him either swim or flounder. Such details, according to Muliyadi, invoke a yearning for the past and help readers "better appreciate [the] cartoons".

University lecturer Zaini Ujang viewed Yesterday and Today's comparisons as criticisms of society, putting forth the question of whether people should accept "development" to simply mean discarding the old for the new without regards to its value. Professor Fuziah of the National University of Malaysia interpreted the book's ending as a wakeup call to parents, questioning them if they should deny their children a more relaxed childhood. Lent agreed, saying that Lat had asserted the theme from the start, showing him and his childhood friends "not in a hurry to grow up". Art historian, Redza Piyadasa argues that the book is an "essay in nostalgia, documenting how interesting and creative rural childhoods can be" compared to "the urbanized childhoods to which Lat's children are exposed". Redza hinted that Lat's other goal was to point out the "dehumanising environment" that Malaysian urban children are growing up in.

== Reception and legacy ==
Kampung Boy: Yesterday and Today was published and released on 16 January 1993 to popular success. The book's launching ceremony was officiated by the then-Education Minister, Khir Johari. The book was sold 25,000 copies within two weeks since its release. It also was released in Singapore in February.

A Japanese edition of Yesterday and Today was published by Berita Publishing in 1998. As of 2012, the book had been reprinted 12 times. (Note: Specifics of reprint: Kampung Boy: Yesterday and Today (Twelfth reprint ed.). Kuala Lumpur, Malaysia: Berita Publishing. 2012 [1993]. ISBN 978-967-969-307-2.) The book along with Kampung Boy and Town Boy was re-released in 2014 by MPH Publishing.

== Bibliography ==
- "Make your wait for the bus an enjoyable one". New Straits Times. 23 January 1993. p. 3.
- Zur Aida (28 January 1993). "'Kampung boy' di pasaran". Harian Metro.
- "Lat masih selamba". Harian Metro. 28 January 1993.
- Zarina Tahir (5 February 1993). "25,000 copies of Lat's book sold in 2 weeks". Business Times.
- "Sharing childhood memories of fun 'n games with kids". The Malay Mail. 5 February 1993.
- Tan Gim Ean (6 February 1993). "Lat records the games he used to play". New Straits Times.
- "Lat pikat orang bandar dengan telatah kampung". Berita Harian Singapura. 22 March 1993. p. 14.
- "Lat menanti anda di dua pustaka". Berita Harian Singapura. 19 March 1993. p. 24.
- "Lat's legacy to Asia". The Straits Times. 22 February 1993. p. 8.
- "Looking on Lat". The Straits Times. 20 March 1993. p. 2.
- "Lat's latest compilation now out as 'Forever Lat'". The Star Online. 31 August 2014. Archived from the original on 4 September 2014.
- Eddie, Campbell (15 January 2007). "Campbell Interviews Lat: Part 3". First Hand Books—Doodles and Dailies. New York, United States: First Second Books. Archived from the original on 2008-06-23.
- Lent, John (April 1999). "The Varied Drawing Lots of Lat, Malayasian Cartoonist". The Comics Journal (211). Washington, United States: Fantagraphics Books: 35–39. ISSN 0194-7869. Archived from the original on 2005-02-15.
- Muliyadi Mahamood (2001). "The History of Malaysian Animated Cartoons". In Lent, John (ed.). Animation in Asia and the Pacific. Indiana, United States: Indiana University Press. pp. 131–152. ISBN 0-253-34035-7.
- Zaini Ujang (2009). "Books Strengthen the Mind". The Elevation of Higher Learning. Kuala Lumpur, Malaysia: Malaysian Translation & Book Institute. pp. 201–208. ISBN 978-983-068-464-2.
- Rohani Hashim (2005). "Lat's Kampong Boy: Rural Malays in Tradition and Transition". In Palmer, Edwina (ed.). Asian Futures, Asian Traditions. Kent, United Kingdom: Global Oriental. pp. 389–400. ISBN 1-901903-16-8.
- Fuziah Kartini Hassan Basri (2007). "Walking with Lat in Kampung Boy—Yesterday and Today". Resonance (15). Selangor, Malaysia: Universiti Kebangsaan Malaysia: 5–6. ISSN 1675-7270. Archived from the original (PDF) on 2011-09-29.
- Redza Piyadasa (1994). "Lat, the Cartoonist – An Appreciation and Tribute". Lat: 30 Years Later. Petaling Jaya, Selangor: Kampung Boy. pp. 39–60. ISBN 983-996-174-8.
- Redza Piyadasa (2003). "Lat the Cartoonist—An Appreciation". Pameran Retrospektif Lat [Retrospective Exhibition 1964–2003]. Kuala Lumpur, Malaysia: Balai Seni Lukis Negara. pp. 84–99. ISBN 983-9572-71-7.
- "Lat's Latest". New Straits Times. Kuala Lumpur, Malaysia: New Straits Times Press. 18 March 1998. p. 7. ProQuest ID: 27524668.
