= List of Kampung Boy episodes =

Kampung Boy is a Malaysian animated series based on the 1979 graphic novel of the same name by Malaysian cartoonist Mohd Nor Khalid, known professionally as Lat. The series centres on the adventures of a young boy, Mat, and his life in a kampung.

The series' pilot episode aired in 1997, and it began broadcasting from 1999 to 2000, with 2 seasons and 26 episodes.

== Series overview ==
Season	Episodes	Originally released		
Season	Episodes	First released	Last released	Network
Pilot		February 10, 1997		TV1
1	13	September 14, 1999	December 7, 1999	Astro Ria
2	13	June 20, 2000	September 12, 2000	Astro Ria

== Episodes ==
=== Pilot (1997) ===
Title	Directed by	Written by	Original release date
"Kampung Boy"	Frank Saperstein	Lat	10 February 1997

=== Season 1 (1999) ===
No. overall	No. in season	Title	Title in English	Original release date
1	1	"Naik Keretaku"	"Dad's Driving Test"	14 September 1999
Yeop goes to the city to take a driving test, but things go haywire.
2	2	"Si Mat Main Wayang"	"The Shadow Knows"	21 September 1999
The kampung welcomes a town girl, Normah, whose parents have passed away. Yeop and Tok Din organise a shadow play for the kampung folks. Guest appearance: Halim Othman as Tok Dalang.
3	3	"Sang Debab"	"The Debab"	28 September 1999
Mat saves a baby elephant trapped in the mud and names her Debab. Debab's mother goes wild, searching for her baby. Mat and his schoolmates perform at a show. Things go out of control when a group of elephants goes on a rampage. Debab then reunites with her mother.
4	4	"Ana Hilang"	"Ana's Missing"	5 October 1999
Mat, Bo, and Tak worry that Ana has gone missing after they refused to play with her. Yeop manages to repair his new television while his wife and Opah prepare the food. Mat reunites with his younger sister and family, while Mustapha and his son, Farouk, watch the sunset. Guest appearance: Radhi Khalid as the judge.
5	5	"Antara Monyet dan Bisnes Kelapa"	"Between the Monkey and the Coconut Business"	12 October 1999
Mat realises that he needs a new bike after seeing many kampung residents with bikes. He then earns money for the bike by training a monkey named Leh to collect coconuts.
6	6	"Si Mat Manusia Pintar"	"Smart Like a Flying Fox"	19 October 1999
Mat scores higher in school and becomes a smart boy. Bo becomes envious of Mat.
7	7	"Rahsia Puan Hew"	"Mrs. Hew's Secret"	26 October 1999
Mat, Bo, and Tak insist on knowing about their teacher, Mrs. Hew's plan to kill Tok Din. Normah worries if anything will happen to her grandpa. Mat realises it was just a show, and Mrs. Hew did not kill Tok Din.
8	8	"Antara Jaguh dan Rakan"	"Between the Champions and Friends"	2 November 1999
Mat and Tak quarrel over football. After having a big feud with Mustapha, Yeop arranges a kampung soccer team to compete against Mustapha's city soccer team. Tak thanks Mat for saving him from being slammed by Farouk, and the two reconcile, teaming up to defeat Mustapha's football team.
9	9	"Mak, Kahwinkan Kami!"	"Gone With the Kahwin!"	9 November 1999
The whole kampung is struck by a flood. Yeop and Yah reminisce about their wedding day, when they almost didn't get married.
10	10	"Mat Si Anak Alam"	"Mat the Nature Boy"	16 November 1999
Tok Din takes Normah, Mat, Bo, and Tak to the beach for camping. Following Tok Din's advice, they release the turtle into the sea after Mat saves her. Later, they witness the turtle's eggs hatching, and the baby turtles make their way into the sea to find their mother.
11	11	"Nasib Si Gadis Desa"	"It's a Girl's Life"	23 November 1999
Having been humiliated and bored with being a girl, Ana decides to become a boy and changes her name from Ana to Effendi.
12	12	"Orang Bandar Datang"	"Here Comes the Big City People"	30 November 1999
The kampung faces a shortage of water. Tok Din, accompanied by Mat and Normah, goes to the city to seek financial help, but they are rejected. Kamal and his family come to the kampung.
13	13	"Oh Tok!"	"Oh Tok!"	7 December 1999
Mat laughs at the curse of an old banyan tree, only to find himself shackled by bad luck after dancing on its branches. Note: This episode won the TV Series of 13 Minutes and More category at the 1999 Annecy Awards.

=== Season 2 (2000) ===
No. overall	No. in season	Title	Title in English	Original release date
14	1	"Lain Rumput, Lain Belalang"	"Grass and Locust"	20 June 2000
Yeop and his family go to the city to meet Kamal and his family. Guest appearance: Chef Wan as himself Note: This is the last episode to feature Kamal and his family (first seen in "Orang Bandar Datang").
15	2	"Siapa Besar"	"Who's Bigger?"	27 June 2000
Mat lives in a fantasy world and becomes a giant.
16	3	"Jutawan Dermawan"	"A Millionaire, A Philanthropist"	4 July 2000
The whole kampung is in chaos when Opah becomes a millionaire and philanthropist.
17	4	"Pah dan Pit"	"Pah and Pit"	11 July 2000
Things go out of control when a crow named Pit causes a fuss in the kampung.
18	5	"Ada Budi, Ada Balas"	"Kindness Begets Kindness"	18 July 2000
Normah decides to nominate her grandfather, Tok Din, in a Loving Mother contest.
19	6	"Tiada Jalan Mudah"	"No Easy Way"	25 July 2000
Yeop and his children, Mat and Ana, decide to sell a fish bait spray and make a profit to buy a new video game. But things take an unexpected turn when some of the kampung folks experience hair loss after using the spray and seek compensation from Yeop. Yeop and Yah lose their hair after being sprayed by the kampung folks.
20	7	"Projek Sains Bo"	"Bo's Science Project"	1 August 2000
Bo creates a device that enables him to communicate with aliens. Soon, the situation in the village takes an unexpected turn after Bo successfully communicates with one of the aliens.
21	8	"Curi Tulang"	"Stolen Bones"	8 August 2000
Tak finds a big dinosaur bone and receives praise from the kampung residents. However, he doesn't get along well with Mat, who had found the bones earlier.
22	9	"Pohon Berpuaka"	"Haunted Trees"	15 August 2000
Mat refuses to drink a green vitamin tonic, so he pours it onto a rose. The rose eventually becomes haunted.
23	10	"Ragam Wanita"	"Women's Stories"	22 August 2000
Yeop and Mat are having big problems with women. Following advice from Mustapha and Farouk, they make amends with the women.
24	11	"Ana Ke Sekolah Oi!"	"Ana Goes to School!"	29 August 2000
Ana prepares herself for her first day of school and makes new friends.
25	12	"Bahana Gerhana"	"Total Eclipse"	5 September 2000
Tok Din takes Mat, Bo, and Tak camping while waiting for the eclipse.
26	13	"Jaga Rumah"	"Take Care of Our House"	12 September 2000
Yah goes to Galora Island to see her sister receive an award. Yeop decides to turn his family's house into an entertainment leisure spot while his wife is not around.
