= Scenes of Malaysian Life =

- Author: Lat
- Current status/schedule: Ended
- Launch date: 1974
- End date: 2014
- Alternate name(s): Lat & Easy
- Publisher: New Straits Times
- Genre: Humour

Scenes of Malaysian Life (also known as Lat & Easy from 2002 to 2014) is a comic strip series by Malaysian cartoonist, Mohammad Nor Khalid, better known as Lat and published in the Malaysian English-language daily newspaper, the New Straits Times. The comic strip, which ran for 40 years, from 1974 to 2014, illustrated the common way of life of the multicultural Malaysia. Some of his cartoons in the series also compiled in his comic books.

== Background ==
In 1973, Lat, who was then a crime reporter at the New Straits Times, submitted his comic strip for the Hong Kong-based Asia Magazine with the traditional life culture as the main subject where he drews a cartoon and provide the dialogues about a traditional Malay Muslim ritual, the circumcision. It drews attention from the-then New Straits Times editor-in-chief, Lee Siew Yee, who later offered him a permanent column cartoonist role in the newspaper. Lat then taking that position specially created for him by the newspaper's then editor, Abdul Samad Ismail. This gave birth to the Scenes of Malaysian Life series where his first job is to highlighted the daily lives of Malaysian multiracial culture and current affairs. He described it as a "something very innovative at the time".

The first cartoon that Lat drew in the series is the "Perak Wedding", which was published in March 1974. After returned to Malaysia from his 4-month study at the St Martin's School of Art in London, Lat changed the format of Scenes of Malaysian Life into an editorial cartoon series. In 1984, partly from a desire to step away from the public limelight, Lat resigned from the New Straits Times to become a freelancer, but continued to draw Scenes of Malaysian Life for the newspaper. In 1995, Scenes of Malaysian Life absent briefly from the New Straits Times as Lat decided to take a sabbatical for a year. The series resumed publication the following year until it finally ended in 2014.

== Reception ==
The comic strip was well-received and propelled Lat's work to a greater heights. In the 2000s, the series ran three times per week in the New Straits Times. Some of his works in Scenes of Malaysian Life also have been compiled into comic books, with comic titles like Lots of Lat (1977), It's a Lat Lat Lat Lat World (1985) and Be Serious Lat (1995), which was proven to be successful and well-received.

Ilham Gallery describe the series as "a truly Malaysian narrative and perfectly pictured the life of a nation".

== Bibliography ==
Interviews/self-introspectives

- Mohd Tajuddin Mohd Rasdi (17 March 2019). "Lat, his cartoons and appreciating our multiculturalism". The Borneo Post.
- Tan Mei Kuan (29 December 2020). "Interview with Lat: Kampung Boy and Beyond" (Interview). Ipoh Echo.

News sources

- Annuar Othman (8 May 1986). "Knowing cartoonist Lat through exhibition". The Straits Times. p. 6.
- "Cartoonist Lat on sabbatical for a year". New Straits Times. 31 December 1994.
- Mohd Tajuddin Mohd Rasdi (19 March 2018). "Dua kekuatan jadi rahsia apresiasi Lat" (in Malay). Berita Harian.
- Arfa Yunus (23 August 2020). "NST175: Lat recalls life as crime reporter". New Straits Times.
- Elena Koshy (1 November 2020). "Iconic cartoonist Lat shares his thoughts about cartooning and his father's lasting legacy". New Straits Times.

Books

- Muliyadi Mahamood (2003a). "Lat Dalam Konteksnya" [Lat in Context]. Pameran Retrospektif Lat [Retrospective Exhibition 1964–2003]. Kuala Lumpur, Malaysia: National Art Gallery. pp. 48–82. ISBN 983-9572-71-7.
- Pameran Retrospektif Lat [Retrospective Exhibition 1964–2003]. Kuala Lumpur, Malaysia: National Art Gallery. 2003. ISBN 983-9572-71-7.
- Muliyadi Mahamood (2004). The History of Malay Editorial Cartoons (1930s–1993). Kuala Lumpur, Malaysia: Utusan Publications and Distributions. ISBN 967-61-1523-1.
- Tim Pilcher; Brad Brooks (2005). The Essential Guide to World Comics. New York, United States: Collins & Brown. p. 125. ISBN 9781843403005.
- Lat (1994). "Lat on Lat". Lat: 30 Years Later. Petaling Jaya, Selangor: Kampung Boy. p. 1–38. ISBN 983-996-174-8.

Academic sources

- Lent, John (April 1999). "The Varied Drawing Lots of Lat, Malayasian Cartoonist". The Comics Journal (211). Washington, United States: Fantagraphics Books: 35–39. ISSN 0194-7869. Archived from the original on 15 February 2005.
- Rohani Hashim (2005). "Lat's Kampong Boy: Rural Malays in Tradition and Transition". In Palmer, Edwina (ed.). Asian Futures, Asian Traditions. Kent, United Kingdom: Global Oriental. pp. 389–400. ISBN 1-901903-16-8.

Journalistic sources

- Willmott, Jennifer Rodrigo (March 1989). "Malaysia's Favourite Son". Reader's Digest. Vol. 134, no. 803. New York, United States: The Reader's Digest Association. ISSN 0034-0375. Archived from the original on 4 March 2016.
- Jayasankaran, S (22 July 1999). "Going Global". Far Eastern Economic Review. 162 (29). Hong Kong: 35–36. ISSN 0014-7591. ProQuest 208233691.
- Crossings: Datuk Lat (Television production). Singapore: Discovery Networks Asia. 21 September 2003.
- Bissme, S (30 April 2009). "Kampung Boy Unveiled". Sun2Surf. Selangor, Malaysia. Archived from the original on 29 October 2017.

Online sites

- "History of New Straits Times". NSTP. Kuala Lumpur, Malaysia: The New Straits Times Press. 2007. Archived from the original on 10 June 2008.
- Nor-Afidah Abd Rahman (10 October 2002). "Samad Ismail". Infopedia. Singapore: National Library Board. Archived from the original on 27 May 2008.
- "Creating a Malaysian Narrative: A Conversation With Lat". Ilham Gallery. August–December 2015.
