= Sungai Rokam =

Village in Perak, Malaysia

Coordinates: 4.5785535°N 101.1093857°E

Kampung Sungai Rokam is a small village located in Ipoh, Perak, Malaysia.

Kampung Sungai Rokam is also considered by its residents to be a desirable Malay suburban area to live in due to its location which is near to Ipoh town as well as its natural environment. The word "kampung" means village in the Malay language.
