= New Straits Times =

English-language newspaper published in Malaysia

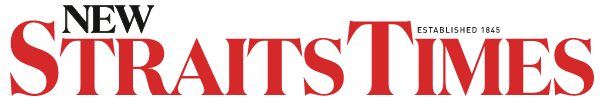
- Type: Daily newspaper
- Format: Compact
- Owner: Media Prima
- Publisher: The New Straits Times Press (M) Bhd
- Founded: 15 July 1845; 181 years ago (as The Straits Times) (66,228 issues); 31 August 1974; 52 years ago (as New Straits Times) (19,065 issues)
- Language: English
- Headquarters: Balai Berita 31, Jalan Riong, 59100, Kuala Lumpur, Malaysia
- Circulation: 30,929 (daily); 85,469 (daily E-paper) (July–December 2018)
- OCLC number: 1167649590
- Website: nst.com.my

The New Straits Times (NST) is an English-language newspaper published in Malaysia. It is Malaysia's oldest newspaper still in print (though not the first), having been founded as a local offshoot of the Singapore-based The Straits Times on 15 July 1845; it first published independently on 31 August 1974. Its sister weekend newspaper, the New Sunday Times, has been in circulation since at least 1968.

The paper served as Malaysia's only broadsheet format English-language newspaper; however, following the example of British newspapers The Times and The Independent, a tabloid version first rolled off the presses on 1 September 2004 and since 18 April 2005, the newspaper has been published only in tabloid size, ending a 160-year-old tradition of broadsheet publication. The New Straits Times currently retails at RM1.50 (~37 US cents) in Peninsular Malaysia.

The newspaper is the flagship print of New Straits Times Press, part of the Media Prima conglomerate. As of 2 January 2019, its group editor is Rashid Yusof. In 2020, the paper was listed as the 5th most trusted in a Reuters Institute survey of 14 Malaysian media outlets. The New Straits Times is considered a newspaper of record for Malaysia.

== History ==
Logo used from 2005 to 2011

=== 19th century ===
The Straits Times was started in Singapore by Armenian merchant Marterus Thaddeus Apcar who had already hired an editor and purchased printing equipment from England; the editor's untimely death would forced him to sell all his printing equipment due to bankruptcy.

The buyer Catchick Moses, also an Armenian, established the American Sarkies and Moses Company and hired Robert Carr Woods as editor; it single-handedly edited and published its first issue on 15 July 1845. The paper was launched as an eight-page weekly, published at 7 Commercial Square using a hand-operated press. Woods acquired the paper as owner in 1858, also turned into an afternoon daily merging with Singapore Journal of Commerce and changing its name to the Daily Times. The name change was subsequently reverted in 1883.

=== Split from The Straits Times ===
Singapore's separation from Malaysia in 1965 made it untenable for The Straits Times to be headquartered in Kuala Lumpur. The impetus for relocation of the newspaper's headquarters to Singapore came from the Malaysian government, who found it unacceptable that The Straits Times and its subsidiaries, which had widespread circulation and influence in Malaysia, had nearly 70 percent of its equity capital owned in Singapore.

In 1973, Simmons, then chairman of the Straits Times Group, announced a restructure of the group. This resulted in the formation of two companies: New Straits Times Press (Malaysia) Berhad, which would be a Malaysian publicly owned company; and The Straits Times Press Group, which would be responsible for the group's subsidiary companies in Singapore and abroad.

The Malay Mail Press Company Ltd. later became a public company and was renamed the New Straits Times Press (Malaya) Ltd. the same year. The New Straits Times Press (Malaya) Sdn Bhd. ceased to be the parent company of the New Straits Times (Malaysia) Sdn Bhd in October that year, when Fleet Holdings, an investment arm of United Malays National Organisation (UMNO) and helmed by Junus Sudin, took over operations. The newspaper name, which at the time remained The Straits Times, began publishing in its current name on 31 August 1974.

On 11 November 2011, 3D publication was introduced to the paper's print and online editions. The newspaper also made history on 21 February 2012 when it became the first talking newspaper, promoting Dutch Lady's Friso product, followed by AXIATA's page number domination in 2013 and in January 2014 it promoted Wonda Coffee "through five senses" on five consecutive days.

=== 2011 redesign and new logo ===
In 2011, the New Straits Times underwent a redesign of its masthead, typography, contents and logo. The first edition in the format was published on 11 November 2011. This lasted until 31 December 2016.

=== 2017 redesign and new logo ===
In 2017, the New Straits Times underwent another redesign of its masthead, typography, contents and logo. The redesign also brings new sections and improved news content. The first edition in the current format was published on 1 January 2017, in conjunction with the New Year. In addition, the website was also refreshed in March 2017, with an initiative for a stronger digital presence.

=== 2019 redesign ===
In 2019, the New Straits Times underwent a redesign of its masthead and cover design, which now assumes the ambition and scope of a daily newsmagazine. The new design also features more stories on various issues of national interest, with an increased emphasis on the print edition of the newspaper.

== Incorporated sections ==
=== Bots ===
Previously known as Tech&U, the pullout was first published on 1 January 1986 as Computimes, an information and communication technology (ICT) section of the New Straits Times. It was earlier published every Thursday, and in the 1990s, the section was published on Mondays and Thursdays. On 1 August 2005, a decision was made to focus the Monday edition on the enterprise market while the Thursday edition focuses on the consumer market. On 1 January 2008, Tech&U became a weekly publication, available with the New Straits Times every Monday with an increasing consumer slant while keeping the pulse on the enterprise scene. Business Computing is also related to this section. It was a weekly section on Wednesdays, published from 1999 to 2004. As of 1 March 2010, it has been incorporated and merged into the Life and Times section. The tech section in the New Straits Times, now known as Bots, appears every Monday in the Life & Times section.

=== JOM! ===
Previously known as Travel Times, this weekly pullout on travel in Malaysia was first published in 1999 published in support of the government's Cuti-Cuti Malaysia campaign. It became the Malaysian weekly newspaper pullout dedicated to publishing travel and travel-related news and features and has remained till this day Malaysia's only weekly travel newspaper pullout dedicated to tourism. The first issue was released on 6 October 1999 and the first weekly issue was released on 2 October 2000. It was published every Wednesday when it started, and it was published on Tuesdays until 23 February 2010 as "Travel". Starting in March 2010, it has been incorporated and merged into the Life & Times section. The travel section now appears on Thursdays and is known as JOM! meaning Let's Go! in the Malay language. This new title is chosen to basically urge travellers to go out into the world and experience all its wonders.

=== The Business Times ===
The paper has incorporated The Business Times starting 1 June 2002, expanding its business section and increasing its appeal among businessmen. Prior to 1976, this is also the business section's name of the New Straits Times. It is not to be confused with the Singaporean newspaper of the same name.

=== Life & Times ===
The segment was previously known as Leisure Times, Times Two and Lifestyle prior to 1994. From 1998 to 2004, the Friday edition of this segment was called Youth Quake after it was merged with the newspaper. The Saturday edition is called Weekend Life & Times, which was later known as 6, from 2005 to 2009.

As of 5 August 2019, the weekly sections in Life & Times are:

- Monday: Bots
- Tuesday: Heal
- Wednesday: Flair
- Thursday: JOM!
- Friday: Groove
- Saturday: Pulse (As of 13 July 2019, the pullout has been discontinued)
- Sunday: Vibes

=== The School Times ===
Previously known as Niexter, The School Times is a supplement targeted at school students. It is published every Tuesday.

An earlier iteration of the supplement was published every Thursday starting in January 2009 and ceased in January 2014. Previously, NST has also used Berita Harian's education supplement and their own, such as Primary Plus (Tuesday) and The Next Step (Wednesday) for primary and secondary schools, respectively, between 2001 and 2004.

=== Cars, Bikes & Trucks ===
Cars, Bikes & Trucks is the motoring pullout from the New Sunday Times. It aims to provide comprehensive details and reviews on almost every car on offer in Malaysia and written by some of the country's leading automotive journalists.

=== Columnists ===
Among the well-known columnists were Tan Sri Johan Jaaffar, Datuk A. Kadir Jasin, Adibah Amin (under the pseudonym 'Sri Delima'), Datuk Karam Singh Walia, Vivy Yusof, Dr. Rais Hussin, Russian orientalist Dr. Victor A. Pogadaev.

== Comics ==
Lat is a long-time cartoonist for the New Straits Times, producing current, topical comics for Scenes of Malaysian Life.

Following Lat's retirement, cartoonist Irwan A. Rahman has taken up the mantle of producing the paper's editorial cartoon, Wantoon Weekly, which is published every Monday.

== Political control and controversy ==
Owing to political sensitivities, newspapers from Malaysia cannot be sold in Singapore; hence, the New Straits Times is not sold in Singapore, and The Straits Times is not sold in Malaysia. The ban was imposed before the 1 May 1969 general election in Malaysia.

In 2012, Senator Nick Xenophon, an independent member of the Australian Parliament, was on a fact-finding mission to Malaysia when he was caught up in anti-government protests in Kuala Lumpur. Subsequently, on 2 May 2012, the New Straits Times published an article by Roy See Wei Zhi and headed "Observer Under Scrutiny". The report quoted a 2009 speech made by Xenophon and turned it into an attack on Islam, ostensibly to pit Malay-Muslim opinion against the senator, who was a known associate of then-Malaysian opposition leader Anwar Ibrahim. In reality, the speech had been an attack on Scientology and is recorded as such in the Hansard of the Australian Senate. Xenophon threatened to sue the New Straits Times for defamation, and the newspaper subsequently apologised and removed the offending article from its website. The gaffe sparked media outrage in both Malaysia and Australia, and greatly reinforced public perception that the New Straits Times and most mainstream media merely served as propaganda mouthpieces for the then-ruling Barisan Nasional.

Following Pakatan Harapan's victory in the 14th General Election in May 2018, the newspaper has adopted a more neutral approach in its editorial direction. It aims to promote the mainstream print media by giving fair space to unreported and underreported stories, and not only political ones that are sometimes, according to NST itself, "taking us nowhere".

== Awards ==
The newspaper took home 3 awards at the 2016 WAN-IFRA Asian Media Awards event, and another 3 at the same event in 2018.

== See also ==
- List of newspapers in Malaysia
