= Redza Piyadasa =

Malaysian artist, art critic and art historian (1939-2007)

Redza Piyadasa (1939 – May 7, 2007) was a Malaysian artist, art critic and art historian.

== Biography ==
Piyadasa was born in 1939 in Kuantan, the capital of Pahang, in a family of Sinhalese origin. Initially he followed a study at the Malaysia Teacher's College in Brinsford Lodge to become a teacher. Afterwards, he followed an art study at the Hornsey College of Art in Crouch End, London, on the basis of a scholarship of the Malaysian government. Here he obtained his degree in 1967. Consequently, he returned to Malaysia, where he started to work as a teacher at the School for Art and Design, which shortly before was founded as part of the Universiti Teknologi MARA.

Piyadasa dedicated his life to art, in the sense of focusing on art theory, as well as performing himself. As an artist he produced visual artwork, like paintings, installations and collages. By means of his publications in Malaysian as well as in English, he importantly filled up a vacuum of the sixties and seventies. He initiated a hardly existing debate in this time in his country on art critic and history.

Piyadasa was interested mainly in Asiatic art which he linked with traditional art in Asia, as well as with contemporary art in the West. His critiques offered an answer on the neo-nationalist, Islamic and global currents in Malaysia. He also collaborated extensively with academic and art historian T.K. Sabapathy, which included a seminal study in 1979 of Nanyang Academy of Fine Arts artists, which coined the term Nanyang Style for artists of that era. In 1983, he and Sabapathy authored Modern Artists of Malaysia, one of the first comprehensive surveys of Modern Malaysian artists.

For two decades, he worked a series of collages entitled the Malaysia Series, inspired by aspects of Malaysia's cultural history. In 1998 he was honored with a Prince Claus Award from the Netherlands. Piyadasa died on May 7, 2007, in Selayang due to liver complications at the age 69.

== Expositions (selection) ==
- 1987: Baba family
- 1978: A matter of time

== Publications ==
- Sabapathy, T.K.; Piyadasa, Redza (1983). Modern Artists of Malaysia. Kuala Lumpur: Dewan Bahasa dan Pustaka, Ministry of Education Malaysia.
