= Malay Mail =

Newspaper in Kuala Lumpur, Malaysia

- Frontpage on 17 November 2014
- Type: Daily newspaper
- Format: Tabloid
- Owner: Malay Mail Sdn Bhd
- Founded: 14 December 1896; 129 years ago (47,296 issues)
- Ceased publication: 1 December 2018 (print) (44,546 issues)
- Political alignment: Moderate
- Language: English
- Headquarters: Redberry City, Lot 2A, Jalan 13/2, 46200 Petaling Jaya, Selangor, Malaysia
- Website: www.malaymail.com

The Malay Mail is an online news portal in Kuala Lumpur, Malaysia. It is the continuation of a print paper which was first published on 1 December 1896 when Kuala Lumpur was the capital of the then new Federated Malay States, making it the first daily newspaper to appear in the FMS. In December 2018, it ceased printing after 122 years but has continued as a news portal.

During World War II, the paper was replaced by the Malai Sinpo.

== Overview ==
The newspaper used to be an afternoon edition which focused on local happenings and was promoted as "The Paper That Cares". It was common to find local community news making the headlines. A major example of this was the People's Live Telecast Fund, a public donation drive organised in June 1982 under the editorship of Ahmad Sebi Abu Bakar to crowdfund live matches of the World Cup happening around the same time for Radio Televisyen Malaysia totalling RM300,000 for 5 telecast; each broadcast was underwritten Ditaja Oleh Rakyat Malaysia ("Sponsored By The Malaysian People"). The paper also had featured a "Page 3 Girl" and was not taken too seriously as it had the image of a tabloid with the printing of many unsubstantiated news articles. The newspaper had a commanding presence in classified ads and in the 1990s it was common to find almost half the newspapers comprising classified ads.

In 1997, the Malay Mail was the NSTP Berhad's single most profitable unit through its grip on classifieds which, in the nature of a virtuous cycle, actually intensified its popularity.

In 2018, the website was revamped and relaunched as malaymail.com. The Chinese and Malay language news portals were revamped into Cincai News (Chinese: 精彩大马) and ProjekMM.

On 25 October 2018, Malay Mail announced that it will cease its print operations on 1 December 2018 and go fully digital on 2 December 2018.

== See also ==
- List of newspapers in Malaysia
