= List of Malaysian women writers =

This is a list of women writers who were born in Malaysia or whose writings are closely associated with that country.

== A ==
- Suriani Abdullah (1924–2013), historian, memoirist
- Adibah Amin (born 1936), novelist, playwright, columnist, translator
- Wani Ardy (born 1984), poet, songwriter
- Che Husna Azhari (born 1955), short story writer, educator

== B ==
- Fatimah Busu (born 1943), novelist, short story writer, critic, educator

== C ==
- Bernice Chauly, artist, photographer, poet, novelist, organiser of Georgetown Literary Festival for a number of years.
- YZ Chin, novelist
- Zen Cho (born 1986), bestselling fantasy novelist and short story writer
- Yangsze Choo, fourth generation Malaysian writer, of Chinese descent, best-selling international novelist.
- Chuah Guat Eng (born 1943), English-language novelist

== F ==
- Shamini Flint, bestselling mystery novelist of the Inspector Singh series.

== G ==
- Dulcie Gray (1915–2011), Malaysian-born British actress, novelist, playwright

== H ==
- Khadijah Hashim (born 1942), novelist, short story writer, children's writer, poet
- Ho Sok Fong, Malaysian Chinese short story writer

== I ==
- Siti Zainon Ismail (born 1949), novelist, short story writer, poet, educator

== J ==
- Khasnor Johan, historian, since 1974: non-fiction writer

== K ==
- Shih-Li Kow (born 1968), short story writer

== L ==
- Margaret Lim (1947-2011), children's writer
- Li Zi Shu, novelist, short story writer, author of The Age of Goodbyes

== M ==
- Rani Manicka, since 2003, best selling novelist
- Salmi Manja, pen name of Saleha binti Abdul Rashid (1937–2023), novelist, short story writer, poet, journalist

== S ==
- Anis Sabirin, short story writer and essayist
- Preeta Samarasan, since early 2000s, English-language short story writer, novelist

== T ==
- Hilary Tham (1946–2005), Malaysian-American poet, memoirist, short story writer

== Y ==
- Felicia Yap, bestselling mystery novelist

== Z ==
- Dina Zaman (1969), short story writer, essayist, columnist

== See also ==
- List of women writers
