= List of Malaysian writers =

The following is a list of writers born, living or residing in Malaysia ordered by their last name. This list includes writers of all genres and in any language.

This is a subsidiary list to the List of Malaysians.

== A ==
- Munshi Abdullah (1796–1854)
- Kassim Ahmad
- Shahnon Ahmad, known as a National Laureate.
- Syed Hussein Alatas (1928-2007). Malaysian academician, sociologist, founder of social science organisations, and politician.
- Syed Husin Ali Professor, politician and author of nearly 20 books.
- Adibah Amin. Writer, columnist, teacher, and actress.
- Tash Aw. Winner of the Costa Book Awards Best First Novel.
- Usman Awang

== B ==
- Fatimah Busu

== C ==
- Chang Kuei-hsing
- Bernice Chauly
- Zen Cho
- Chuah Guat Eng (born 1943). Malaysian Peranakan Chinese writer.

== E ==
- Ee Tiang Hong (1933-1990), poet.

== F ==
- Lloyd Fernando

== H ==
- Tunku Halim. Writer and lawyer.
- Noordin Hassan
- Zurinah Hassan
- Ho Sok Fong
- Abdullah Hussain (1920–2014)

== J ==
- Khasnor Johan, historian.

== K ==
- Kee Thuan Chye
- Khoo Kheng-Hor
- Shih-Li Kow. Shortlisted for the Frank O'Connor International Short Story Award.

== L ==
- Lat

== M ==
- K. S. Maniam
- Rani Manicka
- Ruhaini Matdarin
- Mahathir Mohamad
- Latiff Mohidin
- Amir Muhammad (born 1972)
- Ramlee Awang Murshid

== N ==
- Farish A. Noor (born 1967), political scientist and historian.
- Kevin Nyiau
- Nayli Nasran

== O ==
- Julya Oui

== R ==
- Cecil Rajendra
- Rehman Rashid

== S ==
- A. Samad Said (born 1935)
- Preeta Samarasan
- Al-Sayyid Shaykh bin Ahmad al-Hadi. Considered "father of the Malay novel."
- Huzir Sulaiman

== T ==
- Tan Twan Eng. Shortlisted for the Booker Prize. Winner of the Man Asian Literary Prize and the Walter Scott Prize for Historical Fiction.
- Faisal Tehrani
- Chiew-Siah Tei

== U ==
- Uthaya Sankar SB

== V ==
- Martin Vengadesan

== W ==
- Wong Phui Nam

== Z ==
- Rahimidin Zahari
- Zainon Ismail C.N. Afghani
- Dina Zaman
- Zunar

== See also ==
- List of Malaysian women writers
- Malaysian literature
