= Fatimah Busu =

Malaysian novelist (born 1943)

Dr. Fatimah Busu
- فطمة بوسو
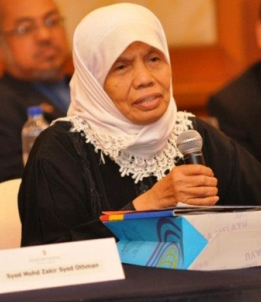
- Born: Fatimah Binti Busu @ Che Su; January 1943 (age 83); Kota Bharu, Kelantan, Malaya
- Citizenship: Malaysia
- Education: Universiti Sains Malaysia (PhD)
- Occupations: novelist, short-story writer, academic
- Children: Adil Hidayat Bin Rosli
- Writing career
- Language: Malay
- Years active: 1957 till now
- Notable work: Ombak Bukan Biru
- Notable awards: Kelantan State Laureate, 2015

Fatimah Busu (born January 1943) is a Malaysian novelist, short-story writer, and academic. She is one of the leading contemporary authors of fiction in the Malay language, actively publishing since the 1970s. She is also the foremost Malay-language literary critic.

== Early life, education and career ==
Fatimah was born in Kota Bharu in the north-eastern state of Kelantan, Malaysia. She attended her local Malay school in Kelantan before enrolling in the Malay Teacher's in Melaka. Fatimah worked as a teacher for almost ten years, until 1972, before then attending Universiti Sains Malaysia (USM) in Penang. Since her graduation she has been a member of staff at the university's Faculty of Humanities.

Her literary career began with her short story Kerana Adik ('Because of a Younger Sibling'), published in the Singapore magazine Mutiara in 1959. Her second short story, Hari Pesta ('Festival Day'), was published in Gelanggang Filem in 1960.

Fatimah Busu's first novel, Ombak Bukan Biru ('The Waves Are Not Blue') was published in 1977.

== Bibliography ==
=== Short stories ===
- "Kerana Adik" (1959)
- "Kucing Kurus" (1960)
- "Hari Pesta"
- "Kembang Siang Kembang Malam"
- "Mawar Yang Belum Gugur" (1971)
- "Nasinya Tumpah" (1972)
- "Freshie"
- "Lambaian Tanah Hijau" (1973)
- "Bunga-bunga Pulau"
- "Sampah Yang Hanyut" (1974)
- "Anak Bumi Tercinta"
- "Anak-anak dari Kampung Pasir Pekan" (1975)
- "Seribu Kali Sejuta Kali"
- "Citerawara Seakor Burung Kecil"
- "Surat Untuk Emak di Pasir Pekan"
- "Heroin Tanpa Hero"
- "Pencari Muara"
- "Yang Abadi"
- "Mahar Asmara" (1983/1984)
- "Al-Amin" (1984/1985)
- "Al-Isra'"
- "Al-Kisah Citera Yang Kesembilan"
- "Satu Lagenda Kelopak Bakawali"
- "Putih-Putih Semek Siti Dewi Dan Tampong"
- "Cerita Biasa Tentang Perempuan"
- "Aduhai Pak Pandir"
- "Aduhai Pak Kadok"
- "Alahai Manisnya"
- "Aduh Pahitnya"
- "Malang Si Lebai Malang"
- "Aduhai Pak Belalang"
- "Aduhai Si Luncai"
- "Gurindam Jiwa 50 Tahun Merdeka"
- "Tanah Segara Bukit Itu"
- "Aduhai OMPP"
- "Aduhai MARA"
- "Aduhai MAHA"
- "Oh Tuhanku"
- "Perjalanan Ke Negara Api"
- "Perkembalian Seorang Hang Tuah"
- "Aku"
- "Surat Cinta"
- "Air Mata Di Pasir Pekan"
- "Kelopak Bunga Pahit"
- "Bunga-Bunga Yang Berguguran Bunga-Bunga Yang Bertaburan"
- "Keajaiban Alam" (2003)

=== Short fiction collections ===
- Yang Abadi (1980)
- Lambaian Tanah Hijau (1980)
- Al-Isra (1985)
- Keajaiban Alam (2003)
- Bunga-Bunga Pulau (2005)
- Aduhai (2009)
- Kelopak Bunga Pahit (2014)

=== Essays ===
- Kolonialisme Dalam Novel-Novel Melayu, Beijing Foreign Studies University, 1995
- Colonialism in Malay Novels, The School of Oriental and African Studies, University of London, 1995

=== Poetry collections ===
- "Apa Ada Di Sana Versi Dunia" (2004)

=== Novels ===
- Ombak Bukan Biru (The Waves Are Not Blue, 1977)
- Kepulangan (The Return, 1980)
- "Salam Maria" (Salam Maria, 2004)
- "The Missing Piece 1" (2005)
- "The Missing Piece 2" (2006)

=== Literary criticisms ===
- Ciri-ciri Satira dalam Novel Melayu dan Africa Moden (Elements of Satire in the Modern Malay and African Novel, 1992)
- Penulisan Kreatif Teori Dan Proses (2003)
- Salam Maria vs. Sarjana Nasi Dingin (2007)
- Persamaan dan Perbezaan Dalam Perkembangan Novel-Novel Melayu dan Indonesia (2010)

=== Dramas ===
- Gerimis Pagi (1959)
- Puteri Saadong (1960)
- Biduan Dari Neraka (1964-1965)
- Jahanam (1973)

== Adaptations of her works ==
Three of her works namely Nasinya Tumpah, Bunga-Bunga Pulau and Seribu Kali Sejuta Kali have been adapted for television, all aired on TV1.

== Awards and honours ==
- Hadiah Karya Sastera dan Hadiah Sastera Malaysia (the Malaysian Prizes for Literary Works and Literature)
  - 1971: "Mawar Yang Belum Gugur."
  - 1972: "Nasinya Tumpah"
  - 1973: "Freshie", "Lambaian Tanah Hijau"
  - 1974: "Bunga-bunga Pulau", "Sampah Yang Hanyut"
  - 1975: "Anak Bumi Tercinta", "Anak-anak dari Kampung Pasir Pekan"
  - 1983/1984: "Mahar Asmara"
  - 1984/1985: "Al-Amin"
  - 1992/1993: "Ciri-ciri Satira"
- The DBP-MAYBANK Literary Prize
  - 1995: "Melihat Hujan"
  - 1996; "Bulan Berlingkung Di Pasir Pekan"
- Hadiah Sastera Malaysia (the Malaysian Literary Prize)
  - 1992/1993: "Ciri-ciri Sastera dalam Novel Melayu dan Afrika Moden: Kajian Perbandingan (Dewan Bahasa dan Pustaka, 1992).
  - 1996: "Anak-anak dari Kampung Pasir Pekan" (from the "Warna Sari Sastera Melayu Moden" anthology, DBP, 1996)
  - 2001: "Anak Bumi Tercinta" (from the "Anak Bumi Tercinta" anthology, DBP, 2001)
- Hadiah Sastera Perdana Malaysia
  - 2005: "Aduhai Si Loncai"
  - 2008: "Salah Tanggapan Tentang Interlok"
- Other awards
  - Anugerah Sasterawan Negeri Kelantan (Kelantan State Laureate, 2015)

== See also ==
- Che Husna Azhari
- Dina Zaman
- Khadijah Hashim
- Salmi Manja
- Siti Zainon Ismail
