= Salmi Manja =

Malaysian novelist, poet, and journalist (1937–2023)

- Born: Saleha binti Abdul Rashid; 24 July 1937; Singapore, Straits Settlements
- Died: 26 December 2023 (aged 86); Subang Jaya, Selangor, Malaysia
- Occupations: Novelist, poet, journalist
- Writing career
- Pen name: Salmi Manja; Melati Desa; Rashidah Salleh
- Language: Malay
- Notable works: Hari Mana Bulan Mana; Sayang Ustazah Sayang

Saleha binti Abdul Rashid (24 July 1937 – 26 December 2023), better known by her pen name Salmi Manja, was a Malaysian novelist, poet, and journalist. She was among the first Malaysian professional women writers and best known for her 1960 novel Hari Mana Bulan Mana (What Day What Month). Femininity, women's issues, and Islam are recurring themes in her work.

== Biography ==
Salmi went to Darul Maarif Arabic-language school and Tong Chai English School in Singapore. In 1956, Salmi attended a writing course offered by the Malay writer Harun Aminurrashid and became a member of the ASAS 50 group along with Usman Awang.

Before her career as a journalist and writer, Salmi worked as a religious teacher in her former school Darul Maarif during which time she contributed works of poetry to a number of local magazines. Salmi later became a journalist for Semenanjung and Berita Harian.

In April 1958, Salmi married the noted novelist and poet A. Samad Said and moved from Singapore to join him in Kuala Lumpur. Throughout the 1960s and 1970s, she published five other novels and two anthologies of short stories and poems. She continued her career as a journalist, working with Cahaya Lembaga and the Selangor Islamic Women's Association.

Salmi died on 26 December 2023, at the age of 86.

== Selected works ==
=== Novels ===
- 1960, Hari Mana Bulan Mana (What Day What Month)
- 1968, Rindu Hilang Ditapak Tangan
- Sayang Ustazah Sayang (A Pity, Ustazah, a Pity)

=== Collection of short stories ===
- Daun-daun Berguguran (Fallen Leaves)

== See also ==
- Adibah Amin
- Dina Zaman
- Fatimah Busu
- Khadijah Hashim
- Siti Zainon Ismail
