= Anis Sabirin =

Malaysian writer

Anis Sabirin (born 1 March 1936), also known as Anis Sabirin Ramzi, is a Malaysian writer of fiction and nonfiction, known for her feminist writings in the 1960s.

== Early life and education ==
Anis Sabirin was born in Johor Bahru, Malaysia, on 1 March 1936. After studying both Malay and English in grade school, she attended the University of Malaya, Singapore campus, now the National University of Singapore. In 1960, she was hired to work in the research department of Dewan Bahasa dan Pustaka, the government body concerned with the Malay language.

== Feminist writing in the 1960s ==
Sabirin emerged as part of a wave of major women writers in the 1960s, alongside Salmi Manja, Khadijah Hashim, Adibah Amin, and others. They worked to examine the changing roles of women in this period, which was marked by major cultural shifts. Sabirin's work in this period preceded a larger wave of feminist writing in Malaysia throughout the following decades.

She began publishing stories and articles in various publications including Dewan Sastera, notably "Realisme Sebagai Satu Aliran Sastera" in 1962. Then, in 1966 she published her first short story collection, Dari Bayang Ke Bayang ("From Shadow to Shadow"). The 20 stories in the collection examined the difficulties faced by both traditional women and modern ones, all of whom suffer in one way or another due to the pressures of societal expectations.

Sabirin more directly explored the way cultural shifts were affecting women in her 1969 essay collection Peranan Wanita Baru ("The Role of the New Woman"). She criticized social norms that restricted women, and she derided male writers' stereotyped depictions of women in existing literature, becoming one of the first Malaysian women writers to highlight this issue.

== Later career in the United States ==
In the late 1960s, Sabirin was awarded a Fulbright and a P.E.O. International Peace Scholarship, so she moved to the United States and pursued a Ph.D. in economics at Claremont Graduate University. Since then, she has lived in San Francisco and Los Angeles for several decades, working in the economic field.

Though she was a pioneer of Malaysia's 1960s feminist wave, her later work has garnered less recognition. However, she has continued writing and kept a foothold in the Malaysian literary scene. Persona, her 1994 collection of 16 short stories, centers on women building their own identities independently of men in their lives. In 2008, she published a memoir titled Dua Dunia ("Two Worlds"), which deals with her experiences in the United States.
