= Results of the 1959 Malayan general election by parliamentary constituency =

These are the election results of the 1959 Malayan general election by parliamentary constituency. These members of parliament (MPs) representing their constituency from the first sitting of 1st Malaysian Parliament to its dissolution.

== Perlis ==
Constituency	Winner	Votes	Opponent(s)	Votes	Majority	Eligible voters	Voter turnout %	Spoilt votes
Perlis Utara	Othman Abdullah (All.)	9,638	Abu Bakar Hamzah (PMIP)	5,787	3,851	19,560	79%	126
Perlis Selatan	Mokhtar Ismail (All.)	8,015	Abdul Rahman Osman (PMIP)	6,163	1,852	18,795	76%	97

== Kedah ==
Constituency	Winner	Votes	Opponent(s)	Votes	Majority	Eligible voters	Voter turnout %	Spoilt votes
Jitra-Padang Terap	Fatimah Hashim (All.)	10,981	Husin Salleh (PMIP)	5,856	5,125	22,576	75%	212
Kubang Pasu Barat	Azahari Ibrahim (All.)	8,388	Abdullah Abbas (PMIP)	5,630	2,758	19,303	73%	200
Kota Star Utara	Abdul Khalid Awang Osman (All.)	8,942	Abu Bakar Omar (PMIP)	6,279	2,663	20,053	76%	191
Alor Star	Lim Joo Kong (All.)	10,730	Abdul Malik Abdul Rahman (PMIP)	4,212	6,518	25,540	68%	144
Alor Star	Lim Joo Kong (All.)	10,730	Teoh Ah Thow (SF)	2,289	6,518	25,540	68%	144
Kuala Kedah	Tunku Abdul Rahman (All.)	13,032	Hassan Abdul Rahman (PMIP)	5,542	7,490	25,946	72%	244
Kota Star Selatan	Wan Sulaiman Wan Tam (All.)	8,369	Lebai Othman Yunus (PMIP)	7,824	545	21,069	77%	185
Kedah Tengah	Khir Johari (All.)	11,271	Hussein Che Dol (PMIP)	4,435	6,836	22,762	75%	223
Kedah Tengah	Khir Johari (All.)	11,271	Mohamed Shariff Babul (SF)	1,234	6,836	22,762	75%	223
Jerai	Mohamed Ismail Mohd Yusof (All.)	11,350	Mahmood Abdullah (PMIP)	6,403	4,947	24,820	72%	126
Baling	Harun Abdullah (All.)	12,118	Syed Jan Aljeffri (PMIP)	3,521	8,597	23,043	75%	132
Baling	Harun Abdullah (All.)	12,118	Wan Basor Ali Wan Salim (Ind.)	1,605	8,597	23,043	75%	132
Sungei Patani	Abdul Samad Osman (All.)	9,186	Mansor Tobeng (SF)	5,673	3,513	20,031	75%	170
Kulim Utara	Hanafi Mohd Yunus (All.)	12,281	Khatib Shorbaini Hassan (PMIP)	2,533	9,748	19,708	76%	310
Kulim-Bandar Bahru	Tan Tye Chek (All.)	11,317	Choong Ah Fong (SF)	4,946	6,371	23,264	71%	344

== Kelantan ==
Constituency	Winner	Votes	Opponent(s)	Votes	Majority	Eligible voters	Voter turnout %	Spoilt votes
Tumpat	Hassan Ahmad (PMIP)	10,249	Mahmood Zakariah Juhan (All.)	6,380	3,869	24,383	68%	115
Kelantan Hilir	Wan Mustapha Ali (PMIP)	12,438	Hassan Ya'acob (All.)	4,327	8,111	23,975	70%	115
Pasir Mas Hilir	Nik Man Nik Mohamed (PMIP)	12,422	Che Omar Ali (All.)	3,130	9,292	21,891	70%	74
Kota Bharu Hilir	Ahmad Abdullah (PMIP)	9,463	Nik Ismail Nik Hussin (All.)	6,302	3,161	24,178	65%	97
Bachok	Zulkiflee Muhammad (PMIP)	13,880	Nik Mohamed Ali (All.)	3,761	10,119	25,382	70%	231
Kota Bharu Hulu	Hussain Rahimi Saman (PMIP)	14,775	Ismail Ibrahim (All.)	3,749	11,026	27,421	67%	358
Pasir Mas Hulu	Mohamed Hanifah Abdul Ghani (PMIP)	9,518	Yaacob Awang (All.)	3,559	5,959	18,364	72%	150
Pasir Puteh	Mohamad Asri Muda (PMIP)	12,284	Mohamed Idris (All.)	6,630	5,654	26,326	72%	117
Tanah Merah	Othman Abdullah (PMIP)	12,752	Azhari Abdul Rahim (All.)	6,774	5,978	25,793	75%	127
Ulu Kelantan	Tengku Indra Petra Sultan Ibrahim (All.)	8,770	Amaluddin Darus (PMIP)	8,306	464	22,839	76%	62
Ulu Kelantan	Tengku Indra Petra Sultan Ibrahim (All.)	8,770	Mohamed Yatim Shamsuddin (Negara)	292	464	22,839	76%	62

== Trengganu ==
Constituency	Winner	Votes	Opponent(s)	Votes	Majority	Eligible voters	Voter turnout %	Spoilt votes
Besut	Burhanuddin al-Helmy (PMIP)	9,988	Husin Abdullah (All.)	4,216	5,772	21,399	67%	205
Kuala Trengganu Utara	Hasan Adli Mohd Arshad (PMIP)	7,262	Wan Abdul Kadir Ismail (All.)	6,535	727	19,994	73%	274
Kuala Trengganu Utara	Hasan Adli Mohd Arshad (PMIP)	7,262	Ibrahim Abdul Kadir (Ind.)	540	727	19,994	73%	274
Kuala Trengganu Selatan	Onn Jaafar (Negara)	7,986	Engku Muhsein Abdul Kadir (All.)	5,374	2,612	19,247	70%	131
Dungun	Che Khadijah Mohd Sidik (PMIP)	6,249	Mohamed Adib Omar (All.)	4,158	2,091	15,759	70%	100
Dungun	Che Khadijah Mohd Sidik (PMIP)	6,249	Wan Salleh Abdul Kadir (SF)	595	2,091	15,759	70%	100
Kemaman	Wan Yahya Wan Mohamed (All.)	0	Returned unopposed	0	0	17,734	nil	nil
Trengganu Tengah	Harun Pilus (PMIP)	8,625	Ismail Kassim (All.)	4,954	3,671	20,765	71%	188
Trengganu Tengah	Harun Pilus (PMIP)	8,625	Setia Abu Bakar (Ind.)	758	3,671	20,765	71%	188
Trengganu Tengah	Harun Pilus (PMIP)	8,625	Engku Sayed Mohsin Zabidin (Ind.)	199	3,671	20,765	71%	188

== Penang ==
Constituency	Winner	Votes	Opponent(s)	Votes	Majority	Eligible voters	Voter turnout %	Spoilt votes
Bagan	Tan Cheng Bee (All.)	3,945	B. H. Oon (Ind.)	3,782	163	16,698	68%	104
Bagan	Tan Cheng Bee (All.)	3,945	Pritam Singh (PPP)	1,792	163	16,698	68%	104
Bagan	Tan Cheng Bee (All.)	3,945	Abdullah bin Abas (PMIP)	1532	163	16,698	68%	104
Bagan	Tan Cheng Bee (All.)	3,945	Wee Tiong Ghee (Ind.)	297	163	16,698	68%	104
Seberang Tengah	Ibrahim Abdul Rahman (All.)	9,187	Kang Eng Wah (SF)	7,910	1,277	26,773	75%	244
Seberang Tengah	Ibrahim Abdul Rahman (All.)	9,187	Abdul Hamid (PMIP)	3,082	1,277	26,773	75%	244
Seberang Selatan	Veerappen Veerathan (SF)	5,077	Tay Hooi Soo (All.)	4,313	764	15,920	79%	107
Seberang Selatan	Veerappen Veerathan (SF)	5,077	Md. Jais Sudin (PMIP)	3,093	764	15,920	79%	107
Penang Utara	Geh Chong Keat (All.)	8,739	Lau Teik Hai (SF)	7,880	859	25,537	69%	170
Penang Utara	Geh Chong Keat (All.)	8,739	Shaik Ahmad Shaik Mohamed (Ind.)	845	859	25,537	69%	170
Penang Selatan	Ismail Idris (All.)	9,821	D. S. Ramanathan (SF)	9,563	258	30,903	73%	144
Penang Selatan	Ismail Idris (All.)	9,821	Omar Long (PMIP)	2,585	258	30,903	73%	144
Penang Selatan	Ismail Idris (All.)	9,821	Mansor (Ind.)	359	258	30,903	73%	144
Tanjong	Tan Phock Kin (SF)	11,333	G. H. Goh (All.)	6,448	4,885	28,086	72%	237
Tanjong	Tan Phock Kin (SF)	11,333	Khoo Yat See (PPP)	2,107	4,885	28,086	72%	237
Dato' Kramat	Lim Kean Siew (SF)	10,474	Lee Thean Chu (All.)	5,048	5,426	22,058	72%	103
Dato' Kramat	Lim Kean Siew (SF)	10,474	C. M. Ramli (Ind.)	286	5,426	22,058	72%	103
Seberang Utara	Ahmad Saaid (All.)	12,748	Yusof Rawa (PMIP)	4,537	8,211	22,978	75%	249
