= Metropolitan Area Outer Underground Discharge Channel =

Underground water infrastructure project in Kasukabe, Saitama prefecture, Japan

Coordinates: 35°59′51″N 139°48′42″E

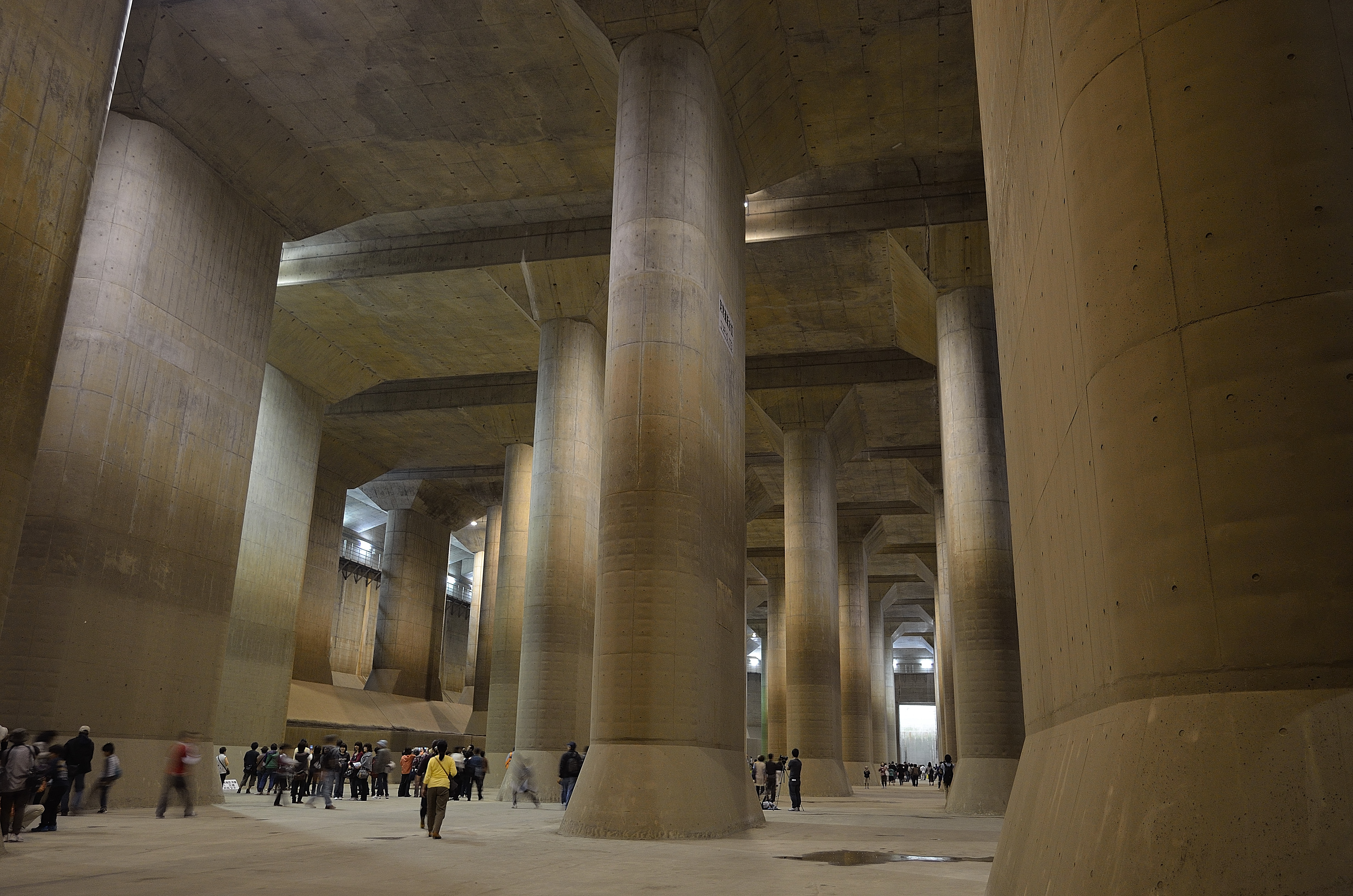
Pressure control water tank

The Metropolitan Area Outer Underground Discharge Channel (Japanese: 首都圏外郭放水路, Hepburn: shutoken gaikaku hōsuiro), popularly known as G-Cans, is an underground water infrastructure project in Japan. It is the world's largest underground flood water diversion facility, built to mitigate overflowing of the city's major waterways and rivers during rain and typhoon seasons. It is located between Showa and Kasukabe in Saitama prefecture, on the outskirts of the city of Tokyo in the Greater Tokyo Area.

Work on the project started in 1992 and was completed by early 2006. It consists of five concrete containment silos with heights of 65 metres (213 ft) and diameters of 32 metres (105 ft), connected by 6.4 kilometres (4.0 mi) of tunnels, 50 metres (160 ft) beneath the surface, as well as a large water tank with a height of 25.4 metres (83 ft), with a length of 177 metres (581 ft), with a width of 78 metres (256 ft), and with fifty-nine massive pillars connected to seventy-eight 10 MW (13,000 hp) pumps that can pump up to 200 metric tons (200 long tons; 220 short tons) of water into the Edo River per second.

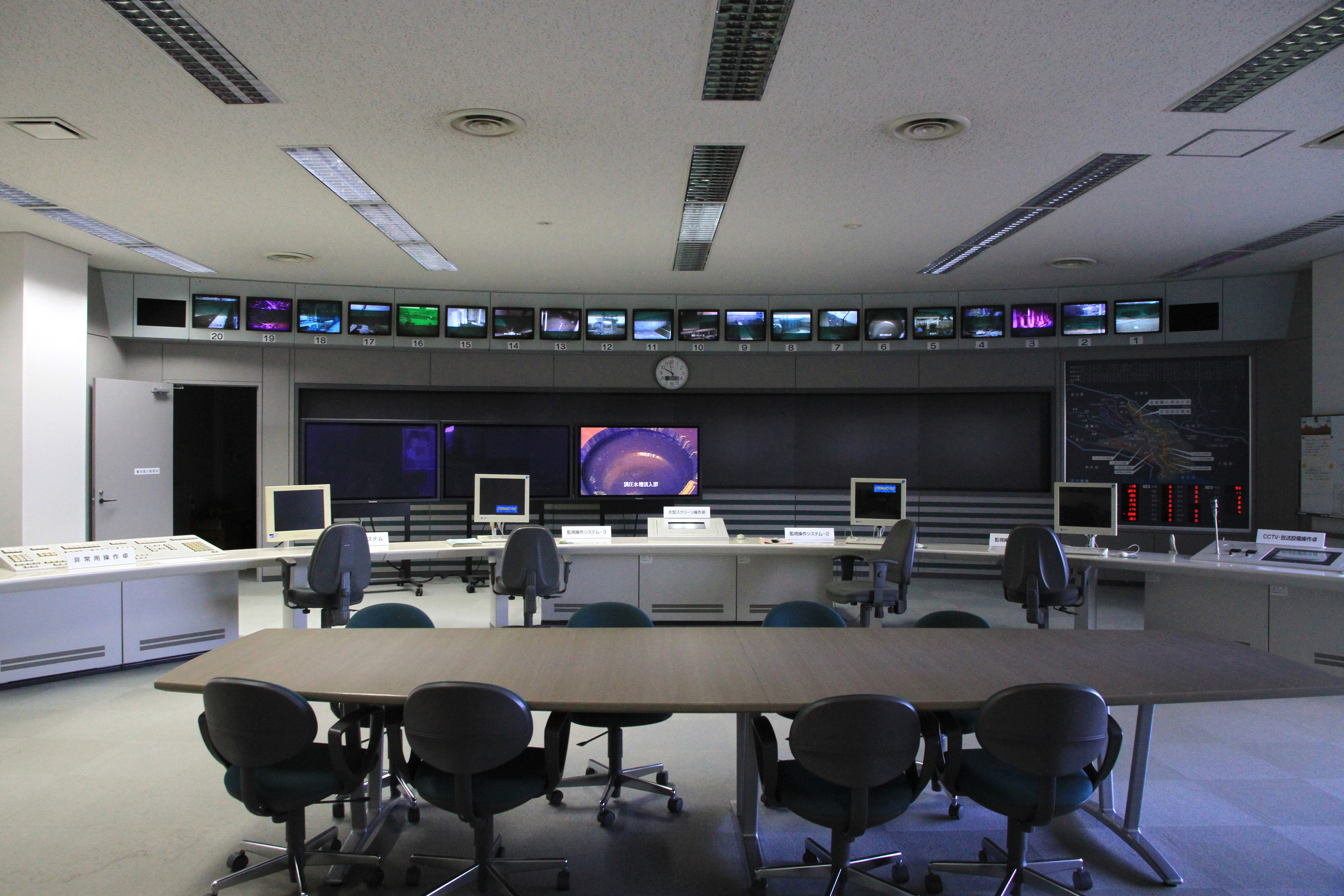
Central control room (pictured in 2012)

== G-Cans ==
G-Cans, originally G-CANS PROJECT, is the name of a civic group whose goal is to "transform the area surrounding the Metropolitan Area Outer Underground Discharge Channel and the Shōwa Drainage Pump Station into a new cultural and community hub, utilizing these regional resources to promote regional development"; "CANS" represents the idea that "anything can be done with the ideas and actionable proposals of us citizens". While the term "G-Cans" is commonly used in English to refer to the Metropolitan Area Outer Underground Discharge Channel itself, it originally refers to this specific civic initiative.

== In popular culture ==
The facility was featured in the below series:

- Chapter 6 of "KL Tower of Terror", a novel by Nayli Nasran.

== See also ==
- Tunnel and Reservoir Plan (in Chicago)
- Basilica Cistern (in Istanbul)
- Underground construction
- Stormwater
- Sewerage
