= Inspector Singh Investigates =

Crime fiction novel series

- Inspector Singh Investigates: A Most Peculiar Malaysian Murder (2009); Inspector Singh Investigates: A Bali Conspiracy Most Foul (2009); Inspector Singh Investigates: The Singapore School of Villainy (2010); Inspector Singh Investigates: A Deadly Cambodian Crime Spree (2011); Inspector Singh Investigates: A Curious Indian Cadaver (2012); Inspector Singh Investigates: A Calamitous Chinese Killing (2013); Inspector Singh Investigates: A Frightfully English Execution (2016)
- Author: Shamini Flint
- Genre: Mystery fiction Detective fiction crime fiction
- Publisher: Hachette
- Published: 2009–2016
- Media type: Print

Inspector Singh Investigates is a series of crime fiction novels, written by Malaysian author, Shamini Flint.

There are currently seven books in the series. The first book in the series was printed in 2009 and has since been printed in numerous languages around the world. The most recent book in the series, book No.7, Inspector Singh Investigates: A Frightfully English Execution, has been released in May 2016.

== Main character ==
They tell the story of Inspector Singh, a fat Sikh, Singaporean murder investigator, with a track record in catching killers. He does not fit into the Singapore police force culture, so he gets sent by his superiors on investigations anywhere but Singapore. The aim is to keep him as far from Singapore as possible and hopefully to keep him away from trouble, which is always near by when Inspector Singh is involved.

== Published novels ==
- Inspector Singh Investigates: A Most Peculiar Malaysian Murder (April 2009, Piatkus Press; 2011, Felony & Mayhem Press) ISBN 9780749929756 ISBN 9781934609897
- Inspector Singh Investigates: A Bali Conspiracy Most Foul (September 2009, Piatkus Press) ISBN 9780749929763
- Inspector Singh Investigates: The Singapore School of Villainy (April 2010, Piatkus Press) ISBN 9780749929770
- Inspector Singh Investigates: A Deadly Cambodian Crime Spree (April 2011, Piatkus Press) ISBN 9780749953478
- Inspector Singh Investigates: A Curious Indian Cadaver (April 5, 2012, Piatkus Press) ISBN 9780749953423
- Inspector Singh Investigates: A Calamitous Chinese Killing (September 2013, Piatkus Press) ISBN 9780749957797
- Inspector Singh Investigates: A Frightfully English Execution (May 2016, Piatkus Press) ISBN 9780349402727

== Television adaptation ==
Sanjeev Bhaskar will star in a three-part television adaptation of the books for BritBox International. The series will be shot in Malaysia.
