= Ten: A Soccer Story =

Book written by Shamini Flint

- Language: English
- Genre: Children's novel
- Published: 2017
- Publisher: Clarion Books
- Publication place: United States
- ISBN: 9780544850019

Ten: A Soccer Story, simply known as Ten, is a children's novel by Shamini Flint. The story is set in Malaysia on 1986. The protagonist is an 11-year-old Indian-English Malaysian girl named Maya who plays soccer despite disapproval from her relatives and schoolmates.

== Plot ==
Maya watches a soccer match as she imagines herself as Zico. Her parents are arguing for unknown reasons. The next day, Maya's brother, Rajiv, thinks that Zico is useless. When Maya goes to her all girls-school late, Sister Pauline does not punish her, but instead punishes another girl named Batumalar to do 50 squats. The next day, Maya is excluded from the all Muslim class and is sent home but brought back to school after she had mistaken it as a punishment.

On a Saturday, Maya and her family go to the beach with Amamma (her grandmother). The next day, Maya gets the soccerball she asked for and tries to practice but has a lack of experience in soccer. One day, a man mistaken for a robber takes away money from Maya's mom as a result of her dad not paying for the Volvo. The couple argues again later that night.

At school, none of the girls want to play soccer with Maya as they think it is a boys' game, especially Nurhayati who many girls look up to, until a girl named Sok Mun volunteers but also has a lack of experience. Batumalar hurries away when she is caught watching them. Later, Maya watches the soccer match of Argentina versus Germany with Rajiv.

However, the next morning, Maya's dad and mom declared that they will have a divorce. Maya's dad will go back to England while Maya stays with Rajiv and her mom in Malaysia. Maya decided to befriend Batumalar on request by Batumalar's dad. Soon, the other girls want to join Maya to play soccer, except for Sister Pauline. Maya plans to get soccer uniforms but the principal, Mr. De Cruz declines, thinking it would be a waste of money. The girls try to come up with ideas to raise money.

At home, Rajiv came up with the idea to give his field hockey team's uniforms to the soccer team. However, Nurhayati, who is revealed to be the mayor's daughter, complains about how the uniforms were too big. The mayor decides to inform Mr. De Cruz about equality of uniforms in the sports teams. The mayor also volunteered to be the soccer team's coach. However, Amamma is now feeling shame because of this.

== Reception ==
Overall, this book received positive reviews.
