= Pontian Selatan =

Johor constituency

Defunct federal constituency
- Legislature: Dewan Rakyat
- Constituency created: 1958
- Constituency abolished: 1974
- First contested: 1959
- Last contested: 1969

Pontian Selatan was a federal constituency in Johor, Malaysia, that was represented in the Dewan Rakyat from 1959 to 1974.

The federal constituency was created in the 1974 redistribution and was mandated to return a single member to the Dewan Rakyat under the first past the post voting system.

== History ==
It was abolished in 1974 when it was redistributed.

=== Representation history ===
Members of Parliament for Pontian Selatan
Parliament	No	Years	Member	Party	Vote Share
Constituency split from Johore Selatan
Parliament of the Federation of Malaya
1st	P098	1959-1963	Zainon Munshi Sulaiman (زينون مونشي سليمان)	Alliance (UMNO)	9,469; 62.64%
Parliament of Malaysia
1st	P098	1963-1964	Zainon Munshi Sulaiman (زينون مونشي سليمان)	Alliance (UMNO)	9,469; 62.64%
2nd	P098	1964-1969	Ali Ahmad (علي احمد）	Alliance (UMNO)	13,759; 69.95%
		1969-1971	Parliament was suspended		
3rd	P098	1971-1973	Ali Ahmad (علي احمد)	Alliance (UMNO)	Uncontested
3rd	P098	1973-1974	Ali Ahmad (علي احمد)	BN (UMNO)	Uncontested
Constituency abolished, split into Pontian and Pulai

=== State constituency ===
Parliamentary constituency	State constituency						
Parliamentary constituency	1954–59*	1959–1974	1974–1986	1986–1995	1995–2004	2004–2018	2018–present
Pontian Selatan		Pontian Dalam					
Pontian Selatan		Pontian Kechil					

=== Historical boundaries ===
State Constituency	Area
State Constituency	1959
Pontian Dalam	Kayu Ara Pesong; Kukup; Pekan Nanas; Pengkalan Raja; Serkat
Pontian Kechil	Kampung Teluk Kerang; Parit Mesjid; Penerok; Pontian; Rambah

== Election results ==
Malaysian general election, 1969: Pontian Selatan
Party	Candidate	Votes	%	∆%
On the nomination day, Ali Ahmad won uncontested.
Alliance	Ali Ahmad			
Total valid votes			100.00	
Total rejected ballots				
Unreturned ballots				
Turnout				
Registered electors		27,924		
Majority				
Alliance hold		Swing		

Malaysian general election, 1964: Pontian Selatan
Party	Candidate	Votes	%	∆%
Alliance	Ali Ahmad	13,759	69.95	▲7.31
Socialist Front	Tan Tai Chee	5,910	30.05	▼7.31
Total valid votes		19,669	100.00	
Total rejected ballots		565		
Unreturned ballots		0		
Turnout		20,234	82.36	
Registered electors		24,569		
Majority		7,849	39.90	▲14.62
Alliance hold		Swing		

Malayan general election, 1959: Pontian Selatan
Party	Candidate	Votes	%
Alliance	Zainon Munshi Sulaiman	9,469	62.64
Socialist Front	Lee Ah Leng	5,648	37.36
Total valid votes		15,117	100.00
Total rejected ballots		227	
Unreturned ballots		0	
Turnout		15,344	81.82
Registered electors		18,753	
Majority		3,821	25.28
This was a new constituency created.
