= Inspector Singh Investigates: A Most Peculiar Malaysian Murder =

Novel by Shamini Flint

- First edition
- Author: Shamini Flint
- Language: English
- Series: Inspector Singh Investigates
- Genre: Crime novel
- Publisher: Hachette
- Publication date: 2009
- Publication place: United Kingdom
- Media type: Print (Paperback); online
- Pages: 384 pp
- ISBN: 978-0-7481-1167-1
- OCLC: N/A
- Preceded by: N/A
- Followed by: A Bali Conspiracy Most Foul

A Most Peculiar Malaysian Murder is the debut novel and the first installment in the Inspector Singh Investigates series by Shamini Flint.

== Synopsis ==
The book opens with the murder of Alan Lee, a Malaysian Chinese businessman and playboy, with his widow, the former Singaporean model Chelsea Liew as the prime suspect. As it was an election year in Singapore, the Singaporean government has sent a police detective (the titular Inspector Singh) to ensure that something is "being seen to be done."

Shortly before his death, Alan Lee was involved in a messy divorce and child custody battle with Chelsea. To improve his chances of gaining custody of his children, he converted to Islam to deprive Chelsea of any chance of gaining custody of her children (without converting herself, which she is loath to do). At first, the Malaysian authorities refuse to listen to Singh's request to re-open what they see as a "cut and dried case." However, when Chelsea's brother-in-law, Jasper, confesses to the murder of his brother Alan, it forces the police to re-open investigations into the murder: inspector Singh is not convinced that Jasper did shoot his brother — the gun that killed Alan has yet to be found.

While investigating Alan's death, Inspector Singh and his Malaysian counterparts, Inspector Mohammed and Sergeant Shukor, uncover secret affairs, family feuds, and forbidden love, as well as abuses in Malaysia's logging and biofuels industry—including ethnic cleansing in East Malaysia— all before another murder destroys the Lee family.
