= Harold Crouch =

Australian political scientist (1940–2023)

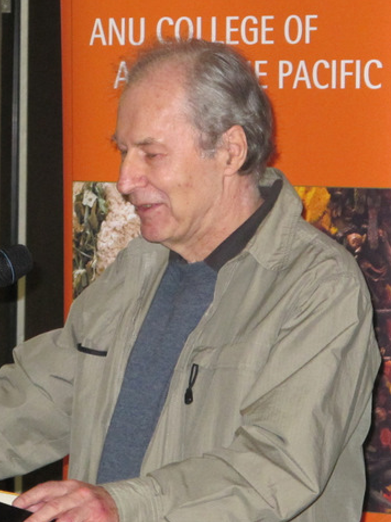

Harold Arthur Crouch (18 July 1940 – 27 August 2023) was an Australian political science scholar and author. He had been described as "one of the pre-eminent scholars of Indonesian politics." Most of his books were published under "Harold Crouch".

== Early and personal life ==
Harold Arthur Crouch was born on 18 July 1940 in Melbourne, Australia, at the Mercy Hospital. His parents, Marjorie Hilda Morris (Crouch) and Harold Crouch, were married in 1934 and lived in Elwood, Victoria, a suburb of Melbourne, at the time of his birth. He has a sister named Marjorie. In 1973 he married Khasnor Johan, a Malaysian historian.

== Education ==
Crouch began his studies in political science at the University of Melbourne in 1958. William Macmahon Ball, the "foremost pioneer of Australia's relations with the newly independent countries of Asia", led the department at that time. Crouch received his bachelor's degree in political science from the University of Melbourne.

He studied for his master's degree at the University of Bombay in 1963–65 and in 1966 published his research on Indian trade unions. Crouch was one of the few Australian citizens studying in an Asian university at that time.

Crouch studied for his PhD in Indonesian studies at Monash University in Melbourne under the supervision of Herbert Feith who was at that time Australia's "pre-eminent scholar of Indonesian politics". While teaching at the University of Indonesia from 1968 to 1971, Crouch gathered information that would be used for his dissertation, which was completed in 1975. The subject of his research was Indonesian politics and the Indonesian army. In 1978 a revised version, The Army and Politics in Indonesia was published by Cornell University Press.

== Career ==
From 1968 until 1971, Crouch taught political science in Jakarta at the University of Indonesia. He was from 1976 to 1990 a lecturer in political science at the National University of Malaysia. For one semester in 1983–1984 he taught at the University of the Philippines.

In 1991 he joined the Australian National University's Department of Political and Social Change, Research School of Pacific and Asian Studies in Canberra. His research as a senior research fellow centered on Southeast Asian politics. He was appointed professor in 2002 and retired at the end of 2005.

Crouch founded the Jakarta office of the International Crisis Group in 2000–2001, after Soeharto's resignation. This led to the accumulation of information for his 2010 book, Political Reform in Indonesia after Soeharto published by the Institute of Southeast Asian Studies in Singapore.

Harold Crouch died on 27 August 2023, at the age of 83.

== Legacy ==
In the preface of their book Soeharto's New Order and its Legacy: Essays in honour of Harold Crouch, the authors write:

Professor Crouch has been one of the pre-eminent scholars of Indonesian politics during the New Order period, and he wrote the definitive book on that regime's rise to power. His work did a great deal—perhaps more than that of any other scholar—to allow generations of students and scholars of Indonesian politics to understand the origins of the New Order, and the structures and patterns of political behaviour which sustained it. In the post-Soeharto period, Crouch has continued to be a leading analyst of Indonesian politics, and has recently published a masterful book, Political Reform in Indonesia after Soeharto on the successes and failures of political reform.

— Jamie Mackie, Edward Aspinall and Greg Fealy

== Published works ==
Crouch published works between 1964 and 2010 predominantly in English, but also in Indonesia and Dutch languages.

- Edward Aspinall; Harold A. Crouch (1 December 2003). The Aceh Peace Process: Why It Failed. East-West Center. ISBN 978-1-932728-00-2.
- Harold Crouch (1 January 2007) [1978]. The Army and Politics in Indonesia. Equinox Publishing. ISBN 978-979-3780-50-4.
- Harold A. Crouch (1984). Domestic Political Structures and Regional Economic Co-operation. Institute of Southeast Asian Studies. ISBN 978-9971-902-80-3.
- Harold A. Crouch (1985). Economic change, social structure, and the political system in Southeast Asia: Philippine development compared with the other ASEAN countries. Institute of Southeast Asian Studies. ISBN 978-9971-988-23-4.
- Harold A. Crouch (1996). Government and Society in Malaysia. Cornell University Press. ISBN 978-0-8014-3218-7.
- Harold A. Crouch (1975). The Indonesian Army in Politics: The army under guided democracy.
- Harold A. Crouch (1964). The Melbourne Peace Movement: A Study of the Policies and Performance of the A.N.Z Congress for International Cooperation and Disarmament. Dissent.
- Zakaria bin Haji Ahmad; Harold A. Crouch (1985). Military-civilian relations in South-East Asia. Oxford University Press. ISBN 9780195826142.
- Peter Samuel, Harold Crouch (1964). The Peace Movement (dissent pamphlet). Melbourne: Dissent Trust.
- Harold A. Crouch (2010). Political Reform in Indonesia After Soeharto. Institute of Southeast Asian Studies. ISBN 978-981-230-920-4.
- Harold A. Crouch (1966). Trade Unions and Politics in India. Manaktalas.
