= Khadijah Sidek =

Malaysian politician

Khatijah Sidek (1918–1982) or Che Khadijah Mohd Sidik was a Malay nationalist and politician during colonial Malaya and the elected leader of the Kaum Ibu (literally meaning "mother's group"; the section name was later changed to Wanita UMNO) in 1954. She was a key figure in the early history of the United Malay National Organisation (UMNO) and a vocal campaigner of women's rights and the education of girls.

== Early life and political career ==
Khatijah was born in Pariaman, West Sumatra, Indonesia to a Minangkabau family, known for their matrilineal heritage system. She received her education at a Dutch school in Sumatra before moving to Singapore in 1946 and soon after marrying a Malayan citizen. Prior to coming to Malaya, Khatijah was active in Puteri Kesatria, an anti-colonial women's group based in Bukit Tinggi, Sumatra. In 1953, she joined UMNO's branch in Johor Bahru following an invitation to survey Malay women's condition under British rule.

Khatijah's rise in politics was reflective of the social changes experienced by women in the post-war years under Japanese occupation. Most women who were active in politics of the period benefited from the promotion of women and girl's education, women's paid employment outside the home, and the rural-urban migration Women who held positions of party leadership at the national, state, and division level were for the most part urban or suburban dwellers, and were either wives or close relations of political activists or members of aristocracy.

== Women's rights campaigner ==
When Khatijah arrived in Malaya in the 1940s, she was disturbed by what saw as the great oppression of women. In her second visit to Singapore in 1947, she wrote in her memoirs that she was determined to help under-educated women by teaching them housekeeping skills and raising their political consciousness. She joined the women's welfare group, the Indonesian and Malay Women's Assembly (HIMWIM), to agitate the liberation of Malay-Indonesian women who resided in Singapore. However, Khatijah's work with HIMWIM fell foul of the British colonial administration, and she was imprisoned under the Emergency Act between 1948 and 1950; during her imprisonment, she gave birth to a daughter.

Upon her release from prison, Khatijah was exiled from Singapore, but was under a detention order to remain in Johor for ten years. With the support of Tunku Abdul Rahman, she was invited by the campaigner Ibu Zain to join UMNO; her position as a wife of a Malayan citizen made her eligible to join. In April 1953, she became a member of UMNO's congress in Melaka. At the congress, her proposal to increase the number of women in the congress was met with anger and disgust by the male delegates.

== Leadership of Kaum Ibu UMNO ==
In October 1954, Khatijah successfully ran against Ibu Zain and the then Selangor Kaum Ibu UMNO (KI UMNO) chief Halimahton Abdul Majid to be elected leader of KI UMNO. During her time as leader, she travelled throughout the country, managing to win over many women to the section by convincing them she was much like them – Lenore Manderson has contended that Khatijah even shared the bed of village women she visited. Khatijah's frequent demands for an increased representation of women and her belief that there were formal barriers to women's political participation quickly saw her regarded as something as a troublemaker. Two weeks after her election as KI UMNO chief, Khatijah was expelled from the UMNO Johor Bahru branch on the grounds that she had divulged details of Supreme Council proceedings; Khatijah had earlier charged that women were deliberately being excluded from state election lists. The Tunku later determined that there was not enough evidence to expel her, and the UMNO Executive later rescinded her expulsion, but not without warning Khatijah to mind her conduct in the future.

After presiding the leadership of KI UMNO at the national level for two years, she was again expelled for challenging the sexual politics of the party. Her dismissal was officially justified on the grounds that she breached party discipline and rules Khatijah succeeded Raja Perempuan Perlis Tengku Badriah (later the 'Queen of Malaya') who took the baton of leadership following the ill health of the latter's predecessor, Hajjah Zain Suleiman or Ibu Zain.

=== Federal Legislative Council controversy ===
In 1955, the Tunku was urged by KI UMNO members to appoint Khatijah to one of five reserve seats in the Federal Legislative Council; only one woman, Halimahton, had been elected from the 52 elective seats. The Tunku refused to appoint Khatijah; he argued that Halimahton's election satisfied the demand for a Malay woman in the Federal Legislative Council, and that furthermore Khatijah's candidacy was not appropriate since she remained the subject of a detention order. KI UMNO members complained that their contributions during the 1955 Federal elections had been overlooked, and in response, women were urged to stand in town and municipal elections and work their way up. The male leadership would also claim that they could not find capable women to run as candidates.

=== Dismissal from UMNO ===
Khatijah demanded the women's vote within UMNO's National Assembly in 1953 and equal political representation within the party. Moreover, she fought for the autonomy of UMNO's women's section, a separate women youth's section to complement the existing UMNO Youth section, and the increased nomination of women to contest the general elections via the pre-selection of female candidates. But soon she was dismissed from the party in November 1956, and this time the UMNO Executive upheld her expulsion. Although Khatijah was expelled from UMNO for disciplinary reasons, it was more likely because she was challenging the patriarchal tradition and hegemony within the parent party; indeed, one of the reasons cited for her expulsion was that her conduct as KI UMNO chief was 'detrimental to UMNO.' The UMNO Executive then appointed Fatimah binte Haji Hashim as the new leader of KI UMNO, a role she held until 1972.

== Khatijah Sidek in PAS ==
Following her expulsion from UMNO for challenging the party's male-dominated hegemony, Khatijah defected to the Pan-Malaysian Islamic Party or PAS, becoming the leader of its women's section, the Dewan Muslimat. She rejoined UMNO in 1972, but did not go on to play a major role in the party.

== See also ==
- Aishah Ghani
- Shamsiah Fakeh
- Early Malay nationalism
- Malaysian politics
