= Zainon Munshi Sulaiman =

Malaysian politician

Yang Berbahagia Tan Sri Hajah Zain Sulaiman PSM JMN PIS

Member of the Malaysian Parliament for Pontian Selatan
- In office 1959–1964
- Preceded by: Constituency established
- Succeeded by: Ali Ahmad

Personal details
- Born: Zainon binti Munshi Sulaiman; 22 January 1903 Malacca, Straits Settlements, British Malaya (now Malaysia)
- Died: 2 April 1989 (aged 86) Johor Bahru, Johor, Malaysia
- Resting place: Mahmoodiah Muslim Cemetery, Johor Bahru
- Spouse: Amin Ahmad (m. 1934; died 1945)
- Children: 3 (including Adibah Amin)

Zainon binti Sulaiman (22 January 1903 – 2 April 1989), sometimes known as Zainon Munshi Sulaiman because her father was a language teacher or "munshi", also called Hajjah Zain or Ibu Zain, was a Malaysian educator and politician.

== Biography ==
Born in Malacca, the sixth of eight children, she received a good education through the efforts of her father, Munshi Sulaiman. In 1909 she became a pupil at the Methodist Girls' School, Tengkera, going on to Tengkera School for her secondary education in 1913. By the age of seventeen, she was running her own informal kindergarten at Pasuh Jaya Waras in Negeri Sembilan.

In 1921, she became a teacher at Bandar Maharani Girls' School in Muar, where in 1924 she became head teacher. In 1927 she was appointed Supervisor of Malay Girls' Schools in the state of Johor. She headed the Johor chapter of the Malay Women Teachers Association from 1930 to 1949. On their behalf, in 1932, she founded Bulan Melayu, a Jawi publication for women teachers, as counterpart to Majalah Guru, a similar periodical intended for men teachers. She became its manager and editor, using it to draw attention to the position of women, with the stated aims of "assisting fellow women, whether those working at home or those working outside" and bringing "enlightenment to the Malay world".

During the Japanese occupation of Malaya, she attended Japanese classes, organized by the Japanese administration and made compulsory to all teachers. She welcomed this opportunity of being able to communicate with the enemy. After the occupation she organised support activities and rehabilitation for women whom the Japanese soldiers had used as their 'comfort' women.

She was a founder member of UMNO (United Malays National Organisation) which was formed in 1946 and became an independence campaigner. In 1948 she was appointed to the Johor State Council. In 1950, she became a member of the UMNO General Assembly as leader of the Kaum Ibu or Women's Wing of the party. In 1959, in the first general election after Malaya became independent, she was elected to represent Pontian Selatan.

She married Amin bin Ahmad in 1934. He died of tuberculosis in 1945, just before the Japanese Occupation ended. Their eldest daughter, Adibah Amin (born 1936), became a teacher, journalist and writer. They also had another daughter, Fadzilah, who became a university lecturer and a son, Sulaiman Shakib, who worked in a bank. Ibu Zain died aged 86, and was buried at the Mahmoodiah Cemetery in Johor Bahru.

== Awards and recognitions ==
=== Honour of Malaysia ===
- Malaysia
  - Commander of the Order of Loyalty to the Crown of Malaysia (P.S.M.) (1978)

=== Places named after her ===
Several places were named after her, including:

- Kolej Ibu Zain, a residential college at Universiti Kebangsaan Malaysia, Bangi, Selangor
