= Ee Tiang Hong =

Ee Tiang Hong (1933–1990) was a Malayan poet of Chinese ancestry.

Born at Malacca during the British colonial period, Ee wrote poetry in English. His first book of poetry appeared in 1960.

He was extremely disturbed by political developments in the newly independent Malaysia and, in particular, the May 13 Incident had a profound impact on him as is demonstrated in his poetry. He subsequently emigrated to Australia in 1975.

Ee wrote:

"I left Malaysia then when I could no longer accept, intellectually or emotionally, the official and Malay definition of the Malaysian nation and culture. And because the gap in our perceptions was so wide as to make negotiation impossible, I was convinced that I had no place in the new order of things, and not just as a writer but even as an ordinary citizen."

He died of cancer on 27 April 1990 in Perth, Western Australia.
