= Ruhaini Matdarin =

Malaysian writer (born 1981)

- روح عيني مت دارين
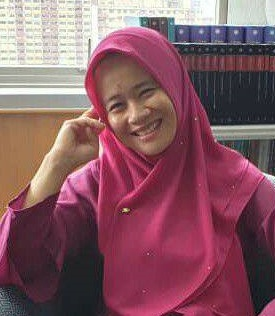
- Born: Ruhaini binti Matdarin; 16 March 1981 (age 45); Kota Kinabalu, Sabah, Malaysia
- Citizenship: Malaysia
- Education: Universiti Sains Malaysia
- Occupations: Freelance auditor, short-story, poetry and novel writer
- Writing career
- Language: Malay
- Years active: since 2005
- Notable awards: Hadiah Sastera Perdana 2017/2018, Sabah Literature Prize (2006/2007, 2008/2009, 2010/2011, 2012/2013, 2014/2015, 2016/2017); Literary Prize of the Utusan Group (2010, 2012, 2013, 2014); Winner of the best book competition of the Malaysian Institute of Translation & Books, National Union of Writers of Malaysia and “Berita Harian” (2014)

Ruhaini Matdarin (born 16 March 1981, Kota Kinabalu) is a Malaysian writer from Sabah.

== Brief biography ==
She is of Dusun Muslim descent from the highland town of Ranau located on the foothills of Mount Kinabalu, albeit her given name, although she was born and bred in the state capital city of Kota Kinabalu in which she also currently resides and she is the eldest of three children in the family. In 2003, she graduated from the Faculty of Finance Management of the University of Science, Malaysia in Gelugor, Penang. She used to work as an auditor in a number of companies. Since 2016, she has become a freelancer in order to have free time for writing and run her business simultaneously without any hassle and is also a life member of the Writers' Union of Malaysia.

== Creativity ==
She began writing whilst still being a sixth form student of Sabah College in 2000. She promptly burst into the world of literature. Debuting in 2007 with the novel “The Self-Right Girl”, she published over 30 books during the next ten years, including novels and collections of short stories, as well as literary processed Sabah fairy tales. At the same time, many of her works were awarded prestigious awards, including the Sabah Literary Award which she got many times. It seems that the virtue of her books is in her capability to describe what is happening nowadays in Malaysia with humor, and sometimes with undisguised satire, resorting to the paradox as an artistic mean, changing the usual perception of life. She emerged as an important name in the transition era literature in Malaysia and one of the best novelist in Malaysia. Some of her short stories are translated into Russian by Victor A. Pogadaev.

== Awards ==
- Sabah Literature Prize (2006/2007, 2008/2009, 2010/2011, 2012/2013, 2014/2015, 2016/2017)
- Literary Prize of the Utusan Group (2010, 2012, 2013, 2014)
- Winner of the best book competition of the Malaysian Institute of Translation & Books, National Union of Writers of Malaysia and "Berita Harian" (2014).
- Hadiah Sastera Perdana 2017/2018

== Works ==
=== Novels ===
- Gadis Adikara. Kuala Lumpur: Cerdik Publication, 2007
- Jendela Menghadap Jalan. Kuala Lumpur: Utusan Publication, 2009
- Pesona Sandora: Misteri di Provinsi Terpencil. Kuala Lumpur: PTS, 2010
- Nurbalkis. Kuala Lumpur: DBP, 2010
- Nisan. Kuala Lumpur: Penerbitan Melur, 2011
- Waris Pejuang. Kuala Lumpur: Utusan Publication, 2012
- Dukana. Kuala Lumpur: ITBM, 2013
- Anatomi Rupert. Kuala Lumpur: ITBM, 2013.
- Di Seberang Jalan. Kuala Lumpur: ITBM, 2014.
- Kotak. Kuala Lumpur: Utusan Publications.
- Dalam Getar Waktu. Kuala Lumpur: Utusan Publication, 2014
- Cerita Perang Bariga. Kuala Lumpur: HSKU, 2015
- Trivia. Kuala Lumpur: ITBM, 2015
- Ajal. Kuala Lumpur: Utusan & UTM Press, 2015 (science fiction)
- Sekurun Mencari Sinar. Kuala Lumpur: DBP, 2015
- Kafe. Kuala Lumpur: DBP, 2018
- Hari-Hari Terakhir Di Jesselton. Kuala Lumpur: DBP, 2018
- Kenangan Melankolik Perempuan Pendamping Waktu: NUSA Centre, 2020
- Yang Mendekat dan Menjauh:DBP, 2020

=== Collections of short stories ===
- Misi Penyepit Kain. Kuala Lumpur: ITBM, 2013
- Melawan Yang Mustahil. Kuala Lumpur: ITBM, 2014
- Jenaka si Darah Legenda. Kuala Lumpur: ITBM, 2015
- Bulan Tenggelam Dalam Perahu. Kuala Lumpur: DBP, 2015
- Short Story Collection: Against All Odds (Terjemahan daripada Melawan Yang Mustahil). Kuala Lumpur: ITBM, 2016.
- Fiksi Buat Marquez. Kuala Lumpur: DBP, 2017
- Cerita Yang Merayap-Rayap Di Dermaga. Kuala Lumpur: DBP, 2018
- Kanvas Merah Jambu Van Gogh. Kuala Lumpur: Nusa Buku VS ITBM, 2018
- Cerita Orang-Orang Sunyi, Nusa Centre, 2020

=== In collective anthologies ===
- Istana Cinta Ayah. Anatologi cerpen pemenang sayembara mengarang cerpen sempena 50 tahun Merdeka. Kuala Lumpur: DBP, 2009 (cerpen Yang Aneh)
- Emas Hitam. Antologi cerpen hadiah sedco-bahasa ke 2. Kuala Lumpur: Penerbitan Melur, 2010 (Cerpen Emas Hitam)
- Karya sasterawan. Kuala Lumpur: BTN, ITNM & Pena, 2011 (cerpen Loran)
- Antologi cerpen Indonesia-Malaysia. Kuala Lumpur: Buku Obor & ITBM, 2013 (cerpen Bendera Yang Kembali Berkibar)
- Cerpen terbaik 2014. Kuala Lumpur: Fixi, 2015 (cerpen Basikal Terbang Dan Misteri Kematian Profesor Jabbar)
- Yang Aneh Yang Magis. Kuala Lumpur: KataPilar Books, 2017 cerpen Misi Penyepit Kain.
- Antologi bersama Anwar Ridwan dan SM Zakir - Perempuan yang jatuh dari langit, cerpen moden Melayu diterjemahkan ke Bahasa Rusia, 2019

=== Tales of Sabah ===
- Puteri Bungsu dan Suluwaden. Kuala Lumpur: DBP, 2014
- Puteri Bintang Terang. Kuala Lumpur: DBP, 2015
