= Julya Oui =

Malaysian author, playwright and screenwriter

Julya Oui is a Malaysian author, playwright and screenwriter, best known for her horror short story collections.

== Biography ==
Originally from Taiping, Perak, in her youth, Oui taught herself poetry and fiction writing, as her family did not have the money to access creative writing courses. After a number of years self-publishing short stories, her first book, Bedtime Stories From The Dead Of Night, was published by MPH Group in 2011.

She showcased Them Horrors Be Everywhere, the third book in the Nighmares, Monsters & Horrors Triptych series, at the George Town Literary Festival of 2016.

In 2019, one of her short stories was included in The Principal Girl: Feminist Tales From Asia anthology. In 2021, Taiping Tales of Terror was published by Penguin Books.

As a screenwriter, she contributed to the scripts of several Malaysian films.

She is a transgender woman, and has spoken about experiencing discrimination in Malaysia for her gender identity. She is a vegetarian.

== Bibliography ==
- Bedtime Stories from the Dead of Night (2011)
- Taiping Tales of Terror (2021)

=== Nighmares, Monsters & Horrors Triptych ===
- Here Be Nightmares (2014)
- There Be Monsters (2015)
- Them Horrors Be Everywhere (2016)
