= Shahnon Ahmad =

Malaysian writer and politician

Yang Berbahagia Dato' Shahnon Ahmad DSDK KMN
- شاهنون أحمد
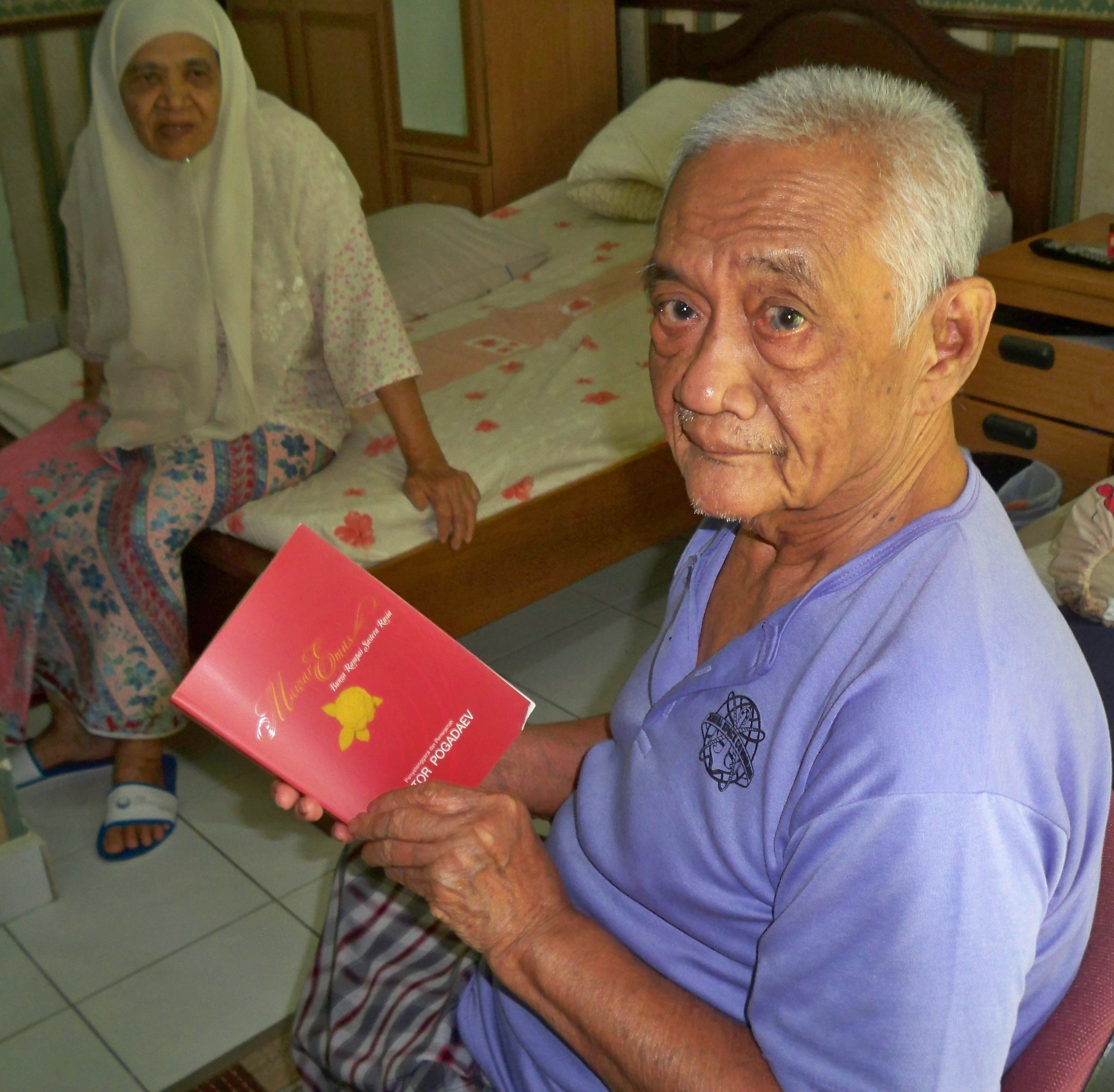
- Shahnon Ahmad in 2012, with his wife Wan Fatimah looking on in the background
- Born: 13 January 1933; Banggol-Derdap, Sik, Kedah, Unfederated Malay States, British Malaya
- Died: 26 December 2017 (aged 84); KPJ Hospital, Kajang, Selangor, Malaysia
- Citizenship: Malaysia
- Education: Australian National University
- Occupations: Prose writer, essayist, politician
- Writing career
- Language: Malay
- Years active: 1950s–2017
- Period: 1968–1971
- Notable awards: Mastera Laureate (2010, 2011)

Shahnon Ahmad

Member of the Malaysian Parliament for Sik
- In office 1999–2004
- Preceded by: Abdul Hamid Othman (BN–UMNO)
- Succeeded by: Wan Azmi Wan Ariffin (BN–UMNO)
- Majority: 335 (1999)

Personal details
- Party: Malaysian Islamic Party (PAS)

Shahnon bin Ahmad (13 January 1933 – 26 December 2017) was a Malaysian writer, a National Laureate, and a Member of Parliament. He was awarded the National Literary Award in 1982. He was also a Professor Emeritus at Universiti Sains Malaysia in Penang.

== Brief biography ==
Shahnon was born on 13 January 1933 as the youngest child to a peasant family in Banggol-Derdap, Sik, Kedah; his father Ahmad Abu Bakar hailed from Medan in the Dutch East Indies while Kelsum Mohd Saman was a Pattani native whose father came to settle in Malaya from Kampong Poseng in southern Thailand in the late 19th century. Shahnon's father had been previously working as a staff at the surveyor department, then a postman until the Second World War when the British forces hired him as a clandestine spy.

He and one sibling of his were able to attend their studies at the Sultan Abdul Hamid College in Alor Setar through financial aid provided by the intelligence services as a reward to their father for his services - amidst common fears by most villagers that their children might embrace Christianity if they were educated in such schools at that time. After graduating from the school in 1954, he worked as a teacher in an English school in Kuala Terengganu. He served in the army from 1955 to 1956. After the stint, he worked as a teacher in various schools until 1967. In 1968 to 1971, he studied at the Australian National University, Canberra.

After his graduation there, he taught at the Sultan Idris Education University in Tanjung Malim, Perak until 1975. From that time to his death, he was connected with the University of Science, Malaysia in Penang which included being a professor of literature starting in 1982.

Shahnon was also a member of opposition political party Parti Islam Se-Malaysia. In the 1999 general election, he contested in the Parliamentary constituency of Sik (P.13) in which he won. He did not contest in the 2004 general election which saw PAS losing that seat to Barisan Nasional.

== Literary career ==
The first works were published in 1950s - he began his writing as an interpreter and a writer of short stories. In 1965, he made his debut as a novelist, releasing the novel Rentong ("Till Ashes"), a drama of characters taking place in a Malay village. The different types of attitude to reality are revealed and demonstrated by its narrative and main characters.

Shahnon published several highly topical "urban" novels since. "Minister" (1967) paid tribute to Malay nationalism. His next novel, one of his most famous ones, Ranjau Sepanjang Jalan ("No Harvest but a Thorn", 1966) tells about a peasant family fighting not for life, but for death with nature in the struggle for existence; Srengenge (1973)—which won the Malaysian Novel of the Year in 1974—portrays a village enthusiast and reformer defeated by the ancient, pagan-based feelings and sentiments of his fellow countrymen; "Seluang Menodak Baung" (How the smalls defeated an elephant, 1978), reveals the complex process of peasant consciousness awakening in the course of the struggle for land distinguished by a sharp social orientation, psychological reliability and a wonderful style; and the "Lamunan Puitis" ("Poetic Thinking", 2003) trilogy among others.

Some of his works were inspired by religious motives, and several novels are written in the genre of caustic satire on the leadership of the country: Shit (1998); Maha Maha ("Great Worlds", 1999); Muntah ("Nausea", 2000). He wrote not only novels, but also stories (the collection "Anjing-anjing - "Dogs", 1964), plays and essays.

=== Adaptations ===
Ranjau Sepanjang Jalan (1966) was adapted into a 1983 Malaysian film of the same name directed by Jamil Sulong and a 1994 Cambodian film called Rice People directed by Rithy Panh, while Srengenge (1973) was adapted into a television film by Radio Televisyen Malaysia in May 2017.

== Death ==
He died from pneumonia at 8 a.m on 26 December 2017 at the age of 84 in the KPJ Hospital in Kajang, Selangor; leaving behind his wife Wan Fatimah (aged 82), four children between the ages of 54 and 58, 14 grandchildren and three great-grandchildren. His remains were laid to rest at the Bandar Baru Bangi Muslim Cemetery the next day.

== Awards ==
- Literary Prize of Malaysia (1972)
- Award "The Champion of Literature" (1976)
- Order of Loyalty to the Royal House of Kedah by the Sultan of Kedah in 1980, giving him the title Dato'
- State Literary Prize and Title "National Laureate" (1982)
- ASEAN Literary Prize (1990)
- Mastera Literary Award (2010, 2011)

== Bibliography ==
- Shahnon Ahmad (2006). Perjalanan Sejauh Ini: Sebuah Autobiografi (Such a long way: an autobiography). Sungai Petani: Yusran Publishing House (reprinted in 2012).
- Pemikiran Sasterawan Negara Shahnon Ahmad (Thinking of the National Writer Shahnon Ahmad). Kuala Lumpur: DBP, 2012.
- Anwar Ridhwan. Pemikiran kritis Shahnon Ahmad dalam novel-novel pilihan (Shahnon Ahmad's critical thinking in selected novels). - Seminar Pemikiran Sasterawan Negara Shahnon Ahmad (Materials of the seminar on the thinking of the National Writer Shahnon Ahmad). Kuala Lumpur, 13–14 November 2007.
- Mohd. Yusof Hasan (2009). Pemikiran Global Sasterawan Negara Shahnon Ahmad (Global thinking of the National writer Shakhnon Ahmad). Tanjung Malim: Penerbit UPSI. ISBN 978-983-3759-45-3
