= Shamini Flint =

Author based in Singapore

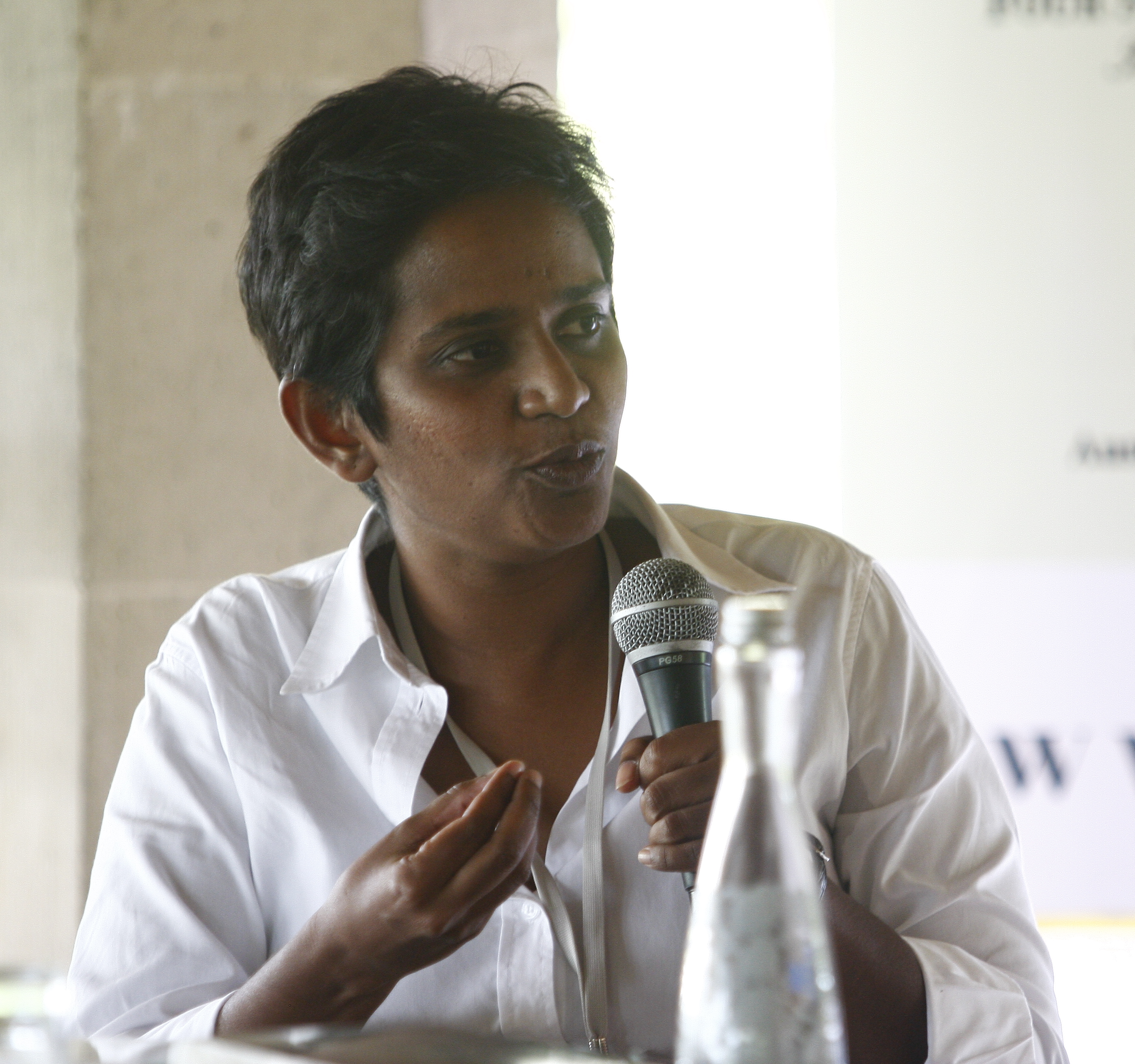
- Shamini Flint on Ubud Writers & Readers Festival 2012
- Born: 26 October 1969 (age 57); Kuala Lumpur, Malaysia
- Occupation: Novelist
- Writing career
- Notable work: Inspector Singh Investigates

Shamini Flint (born 26 October 1969 in Kuala Lumpur, Malaysia) is an author based in Singapore. She is best known for her crime fiction novel series Inspector Singh Investigates, published in many languages around the world. She also writes children's books with cultural and environmental themes. Before becoming a writer in 2004 she was a corporate lawyer at the international law firm, Linklaters. She is noted for her work to promote fair trade products in Singapore and donates part of her environmental book title's proceeds to WWF. Shamini currently lives in Singapore with her English husband Simon Flint and their two children, Sasha and Spencer Flint.

== Legal career ==
In 1993, Shamini received the Council of Legal Education Prize for one of the highest marks overall for her Bar Finals sat at Trinity College, London. Following which Shamini was employed by Messrs. Zain & Co and called to the Malaysian Bar.

Between 1994 and 1995 Shamini studied for her Law Masters at the University of Cambridge, UK. Whilst there she was awarded the top overall mark, the Bevan Prize, the Jennings Prize and a British High Commission Scholarship. She was admitted as a solicitor, Supreme Court of England and Wales in 1999.

She left Messrs Zain & Co in 1997 to join Linklaters as a solicitor until 2002 when she became an associate professor of the Law Faculty, National University of Singapore.

== Literary work ==
Shamini has published a successful series of crime fiction novels, Inspector Singh Investigates. In April 2008, the British publishing company Little, Brown and Company bought the worldwide rights to the first three Inspector Singh Investigates novels.

The first book in the series Inspector Singh Investigates - A Most Peculiar Malaysian Murder. was honoured by The Telegraph, UK by being featured under their Recommended Weekly Special confirming the quality of the writing and a successful launch. The seventh book in the series, Inspector Singh Investigates - A Frightfully English Execution was published in May 2016. In addition to Crime Fiction, Shamini also writes children's literature of equal success, Puffin Books India have bought the sub-continent rights to Diary of a Cricket God, launched in April 2011 and Allen & Unwin have bought the rest of the world rights.

== Bibliography ==
=== Crime Fiction ===
- Inspector Singh Investigates: A Most Peculiar Malaysian Murder (April 2009, Piatkus Press; 2011, Felony & Mayhem Press) ISBN 9780749929756 ISBN 9781934609897
- Inspector Singh Investigates: A Bali Conspiracy Most Foul (September 2009, Piatkus Press) ISBN 9780749929763
- Inspector Singh Investigates: The Singapore School of Villainy (April 2010, Piatkus Press) ISBN 9780749929770
- Inspector Singh Investigates: A Deadly Cambodian Crime Spree (April 2011, Piatkus Press) ISBN 9780749953478
- Inspector Singh Investigates: A Curious Indian Cadaver (April 5, 2012, Piatkus Press) ISBN 9780749953423
- Inspector Singh Investigates: A Calamitous Chinese Killing (Sept 2013, Piatkus Press) ISBN 9780749957797
- Inspector Singh Investigates: A Frightfully English Execution (May 2016, Piatkus Press) ISBN 9780349402727

=== Thrillers ===
- The Beijing Conspiracy (2019, Canongate Books) ISBN 9781838851675

=== Children's books ===
==== Sasha in Singapore ====
- Sasha Visits the Botanic Gardens (2003?, Sunbear Publishing) ISBN 9810498853
- Sasha Visits the Zoo (2003?, Sunbear Publishing) ISBN 9789810800192
- Sasha Goes Shopping (2004, Sunbear Publishing) ISBN 9810523424
- Sasha Visits Sentosa Island (2004, Sunbear Publishing) ISBN 9810523432
- Sasha Visits the Bird Park (2005, Sunbear Publishing) ISBN 9810538588
- Sasha Visits the Museums (2008, Sunbear Publishing) ISBN 9789810800185
- Sasha in Singapore Boxed Set

==== Sasha in Asia ====
- Sasha Visits Bali (2006, Sunbear Publishing) ISBN 9810554044
- Sasha Visits Kuala Lumpur (2006, Sunbear Publishing) ISBN 9789810558062
- Sasha Visits Hong Kong (2006, Sunbear Publishing) ISBN 9810561903
- Sasha Visits Bangkok (2006, Sunbear Publishing) ISBN 9789810565411
- Sasha Visits Singapore (2006, Sunbear Publishing) ISBN 9789810565404
- Sasha in Asia Boxed Set

==== Sasha Sees the World ====
- Sasha Visits Beijing (2007, Sunbear Publishing) ISBN 9789810578107
- Sasha Visits London (2007, Sunbear Publishing) ISBN 9789810578114
- Sasha Visits Mumbai (2009, Sunbear Publishing) ISBN 9789810831554
- Sasha Visits Tokyo (2009, Sunbear Publishing) ISBN 9789810831561
- Sasha Visits the Maldives (2010, Sunbear Publishing) ISBN 9789810865603

==== Sasha in Mandarin ====
- Sasha Visits Hong Kong (Mandarin; 2009, Sunbear Publishing) ISBN 9789810834326
- Sasha Visits Beijing (Mandarin; 2009, Sunbear Publishing) ISBN 9789810834319
- Sasha Visits Singapore (Mandarin; 2009, Sunbear Publishing) ISBN 9789810834333

==== Diary Series ====
- Diary of a Soccer Star (2010, Sunbear Publishing) ISBN 9789810858247
- Diary of a Cricket God (2011, Sunbear Publishing) ISBN 9789810877736
- Diary of a Rugby Champ (2013, Allen & Unwin) ISBN 9781743313596
- Diary of a Super Swimmer (2013, Sunbear Publishing) ISBN 9789810763039
- Diary of a Taekwondo Master (2013, Allen & Unwin) ISBN 9781743313602
- Diary of a Track and Field Titan (2013, Sunbear Publishing) ISBN 9789810763022
- Diary of a Basketball Hero (2015, Allen & Unwin) ISBN 9781760111502
- Diary of a Golf Pro (2015, Allen & Unwin) ISBN 9781760111496
- Diary of a Tennis Prodigy (2016, Allen & Unwin) ISBN 9781760290887
- Diary of an AFL Legend (2017, Allen & Unwin) ISBN 9781760295141

==== The Susie K Files/Diaries ====
- Life of the Party (2018, Allen & Unwin) ISBN 9781760296681
- Game Changer (2018, Allen & Unwin) ISBN 9781760296698
- Show Stopper (2019, Allen & Unwin) ISBN 9781760523701
- Happy Camper (2019, Allen & Unwin) ISBN 9781760528287

==== Others ====
- The Other Bears (Sunbear Publishing) ISBN 9789810865733
- Jungle Blues (2005, Sunbear Publishing) ISBN 9810538944
- Turtle Takes a Trip (2006, Sunbear Publishing) ISBN 9810565399
- An Elephant in the Room (2007, Sunbear Publishing) ISBN 9789810578138
- Partytime (2008, Sunbear Publishing) ISBN 9789810815967
- Panda Packs Her Bags (2008, Sunbear Publishing) ISBN 9789810804497
- A T-Rex Ate My Homework (2008, Sunbear Publishing) ISBN 9789810587093
- The Seeds of Time (2008, Sunbear Publishing) ISBN 9789810804510
- What Colour were the Dinosaurs? (2008, Sunbear Publishing) ISBN 9789810804480
- Snake Rattle & Roll (2008, Sunbear Publishing) ISBN 9789810578121
- Three Stars (2009, Sunbear Publishing) ISBN 9789810823948
- Ten (2009, Sunbear Publishing) ISBN 9789810815974
- Sleep Tight (2010, Sunbear Publishing) ISBN 9789810865597
- Spencer Visits Sydney (2013, Sunbear Publishing) ISBN 9789810763015

=== Other Titles ===
- How to Win a Nobel Prize: A Stay-at-Home Mum's Guide (2006, Heliconia Press) ISBN 9789810565374
- Partners in Crime (2007, Heliconia Press) ISBN 9789810593759
- Criminal Minds (2008, Heliconia Press) ISBN 9789810592332
