= Khasnor Johan =

Malaysian author and historian

- Born: 1968 (age 57–58)
- Education: University of Malaya (MA); Monash University (PhD)
- Occupations: Author, historian, teacher
- Spouse: Harold Crouch

Khasnor Johan is a Malaysian author and historian.

== Education ==
Johan studied at the University of Malaya (in Kuala Lumpur). Her master's thesis, The Malay College, Kuala Kangsar, 1905-1941: British Policy of Education for Employment in the Federated Malay States was published in 1969. Johan attained her PhD at Monash University in Melbourne. Her thesis, published in 1974, was The Administrative Elite in the Federated Malay States: An Aspect of Malaysian Social History.

== Career ==
From 1974 to 1992, Johan taught history at National University of Malaysia. Crouch also taught at the university from 1976 to 1990. In 1991 she began teaching at Australian National University in Canberra. Johan retired from teaching in 1992 and moved to Canberra. She was living in Canberra in 2002.

== Personal life ==
Johan married Australian political scientist and author Harold Crouch in 1973.

== Published works ==
Johan published multiple works between 1969 and 2005 in English:

- Khasnor Johan-Crouch (1974). The Administrative Elite in the Federated Malay States: An Aspect of Malaysian Social History. Monash University.
- Khasnor Johan (1996). Educating the Malay Elite: The Malay College Kuala Kangsar, 1905-1941. Pustaka Antara. ISBN 978-967-937-356-1. Old Boys Association. The Malaysian Branch of the Royal Asiatic Society. ISBN 967-937-356-8
- Khasnor Johan (1984). The Emergence of the Modern Malay Administrative Elite. Oxford University Press. ISBN 978-0-19-582569-5.
- Khasnor Johan (2005). Leadership but what's next?: Malay College Kuala Kangsar 1905-2005. Times Editions-Marshall Cavendish. ISBN 978-983-3318-52-0.
- Khasnor Johan (1969). The Malay College, Kuala Kangsar, 1905-1941: British Policy of Education for Employment in the Federated Malay States. University of Malaya.
- Khasnor Johan (1999). "The Undang-Undang Melaka: Reflections on Malay Society in Fifteenth Century Malacca". Journal of the Malaysian Branch of the Royal Asiatic Society. 72 (2). Malaysian Branch of the Royal Asiatic Society: 131–150.

== See also ==
- Malay College Kuala Kangsar
