= Che Husna Azhari =

Malaysian writer

The given name is Che Husna; while Azhari is the father's name, as prevalent in Malay naming conventions.

Che Husna Azhari (born 8 November 1955) in Kota Bharu, Melor, Kelantan, is a Malaysian writer of literature.

== Biography ==
Che Husna received a degree from Tunku Kurshiah College, Seremban in 1973, and her A Levels from Oxford College of Further Education in 1975.

In 1979, she received a degree from Brunel University of West London in Polymer technology. In 1985, Che Husna was awarded a PhD in Response Engineering from Brunel University of West London.

Che Husna is a professor at the Faculty of Engineering and Built Environment, at Universiti Kebangsaan Malaysia, specialising in non-metallic materials processing. She also serves as the director of the Center for Corporate Planning and Communications at that university.

Che Husna's writings are generally set in Kelantan, Malaysia, and her best known short stories are used as standard teaching texts in Malaysia.

Her first English anthology, An Anthology of Kelantan Tales was published in 1992. Her latest work, An English Sojourn is set in the United Kingdom.

She lives in Pinggiran, Putrajaya.

== Works ==
- An English Sojourn. Selangor, Malaysia: Furada Publishing House, 2008. ISBN 978-983-99748-7-4
- The Rambutan Orchard. Bangi: Furada Publishing House, 1993 ISBN 978-983-99748-1-2
- Puisi Ambo. Furada Publishing House, 1995
- Kelantan Tales: An Anthology of Short Stories, Furada Publishing House, 1992 ISBN 978-983-99748-0-5
