= Adibah Amin =

Malaysian writer

Adibah Amin SMJ
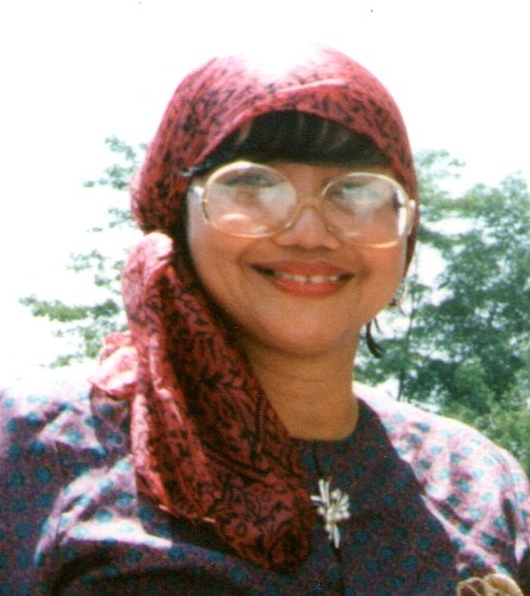
- Adibah Amin. Kuala Lumpur, 1988
- Born: Khalidah Adibah bt Amin; 19 February 1936 (age 90); Johor Bahru, Johor, British Malaya (now Malaysia)
- Other name: Sri Delima
- Occupations: Writer; columnist; teacher; actress; linguist
- Parent: Zainon Munshi Sulaiman (mother)

Notes
- 1950 - 2010

Khalidah Adibah binti Amin SMJ (born 19 February 1936), known professionally as Adibah Amin, is a Malaysian writer, columnist, teacher, translator and actress.

== Biography ==
Born in Johor Bahru, she was the daughter of independence fighter Tan Sri Zainon Sulaiman also known as Ibu Zain. She graduated from her English-Medium secondary school and University of Malaya (1957). From 1958 to 1961, she taught Malay and English at the Malay Girls College in Kuala Lumpur. Later she taught at the Language Institute and Alam Shah School, both in Kuala Lumpur and then became the first headmistress of Jalan Kolam Ayer School [now Seri Puteri School in Cyberjaya] with another stint at the Language Institute before she left the education service.

She worked as a journalist for the newspaper New Straits Times from 1971 to 1984 and later for The Star in the 1990s. Adibah is remembered by many English speakers as the author of the column in the New Straits Times which she wrote in the 1970s and 1980s using the pen name Sri Delima. The columns were republished in book form in 2009.

== Literary career ==
Adibah's writing includes three novels in Malay: Bangsawan Tulen ("The True Aristocrat", 1950), Seroja Masih di Kolam ("The Lotus is still in the Pond", 1972, translated into Japanese in 1986), and Tempat Jatuh Lagi Dikenang ("We still remember places where we fell", 1985). She has also written more than 200 radio plays and short stories. Her English novel This End of the Rainbow was published in 2006. She collaborated with both The Star and the New Straits Times publishing articles on how to speak Malay correctly.

She was also engaged in literary translations from Malay to English: "No Harvest but a Thorn" by Shahnon Ahmad and "Jungle of Hope" by Keris Mas in addition to the works of poetry by Usman Awang. She also made appearances in three films: Adik Manja, (1980), Hati Bukan Kristal (1989), and Mat Som (1990).

In 2008 Adibah suffered a stroke. Though not paralysed, she is unable to work any more.

On June 7, 2024 she was named national journalism laureate in conjunction with the Malaysian Press Institute (MPI)-PETRONAS Malaysian Journalism Awards (HKM) 2023 at the Malaysian Journalists Night 2024.

The award was presented by Prime Minister Datuk Seri Anwar Ibrahim to her sister on behalf of Adibah who was unable to attend the event for health reasons.

== Awards ==
- Best Supporting Actor in the first Malaysia Film Festival in 1980 for her role in Adik Manja.
- Companion of the Order of the Crown of Johor (SMJ) by the Sultan of Johor (1983)
- S.E.A. Write Award, Thailand (1983)
- "Esso-Gapena Prize" for contribution to the development of the literature (1991)
- Outstanding journalist of the country by the Malaysian Union of Journalists (1996)
- Johore Literary Prize (1996)
- Tun Razak Prize for outstanding contribution to the development of education and the establishment of mutual understanding and harmony between the national communities of Malaysia (1998)
- National Translator Prize (2012)
- Special journalistic award of the Press Institute of Malaysia (2013)
- The title of "Outstanding Malaysian Figure" (2014)
- National Journalism Laureate, Malaysian Press Institute (MPI)-Petroas Malaysian Journalism Awards (2023)
