= Siti Zainon Ismail =

Malaysian novelist, short story writer, poet and academic

Yang Berbahagia Sasterawan Negara Datuk Siti Zainon Ismail PMW SMS PJK
- سيتي زينون إسماعيل
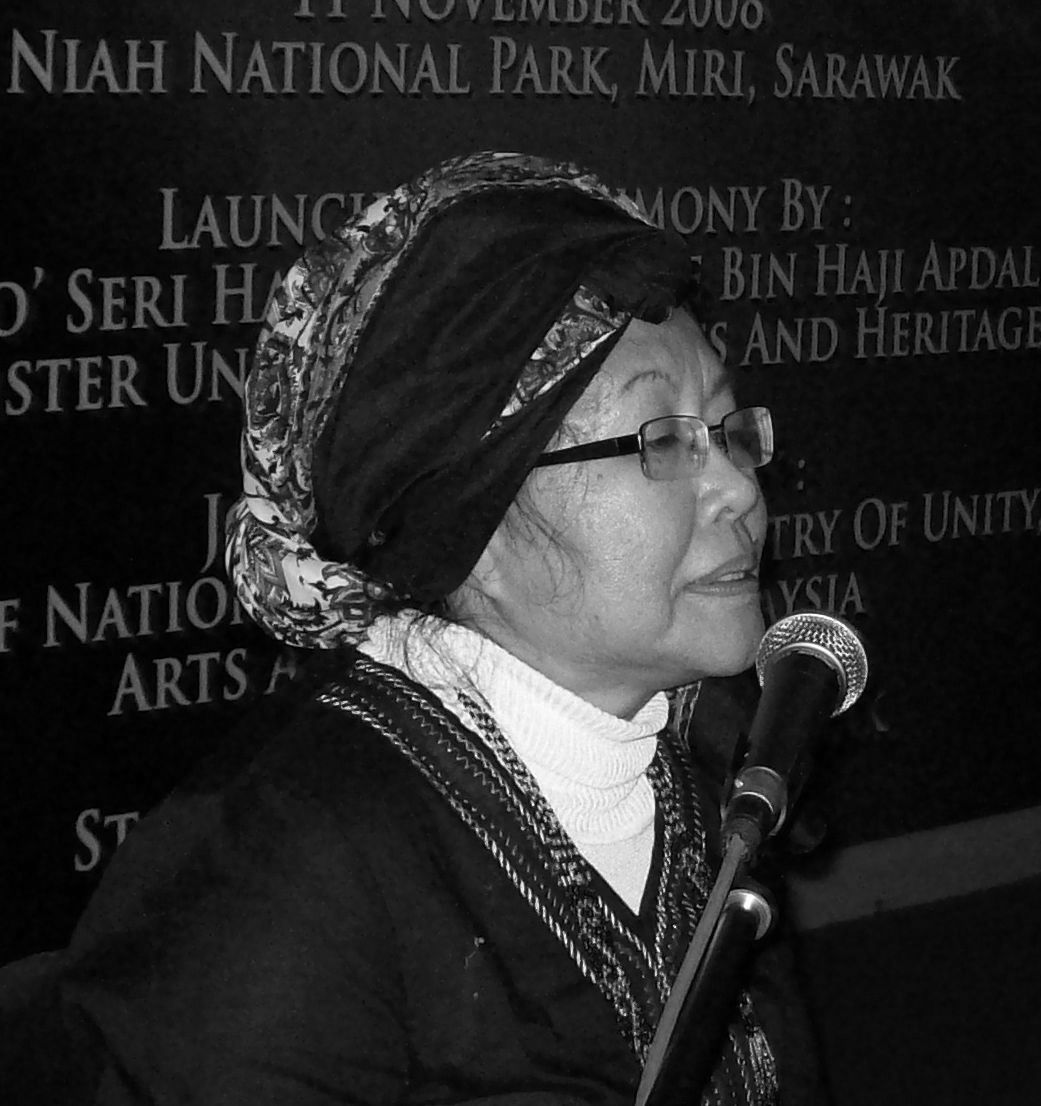
- Siti Zainon Ismail
- Born: December 1949 (age 76); Malaysia
- Education: PhD
- Alma mater: Universiti Malaya
- Occupations: novelist, short-story writer, academic
- Writing career
- Language: Malay
- Notable work: Pulau Renek Ungu

Siti Zainon Ismail (born 18 December 1949) is a Malaysian novelist, short story writer, poet, and academic. She is best known for her multi-genre novel, Pulau Renik Ungu (The Island of Purple Crocus, 1995).

== Life and work ==
=== Early life and education ===
Between 1956 and 1961 Siti Zainon attended Sekolah Rendah Setapak in Kuala Lumpur and Sekolah Rendah Langgar in Kota Bharu in Kelantan. Siti Zainon's secondary education was spent in Sekolah Menengah Aminuddin Baki in Kuala Lumpur. During her childhood in Kota Bharu, she learned the art of batik painting. She was trained in drawing by Idris Haji Salam before joining Angkatan Penulis Semenanjung between 1964 and 1968.

Between 1970 and 1973, she attended Akademi Seni Rupa Indonesia (Indonesia Fine Arts Academy) in Yogyakarta, Indonesia, where she received a B.A. in Fine Art. She has an M.A. from Universiti Kebangsaan Malaysia and received her PhD in 1992 from Universiti Malaya.

=== Career ===
Before establishing her career in literature, Siti Zainon worked as an art instructor with the Malaysian Ministry of Culture, Youth, and Sport until 1976. As art instructor, she conducted art lessons for children in Taman Budaya and later, at the Pasar Seni in Kuala Lumpur. After attaining postgraduate qualifications, she took up lectureship and fellowship in Malay Studies at Universiti Kebangsaan Malaysia.

== Pulau Renik Ungu (The Island of the Purple Crocus) ==
A semi-autobiographical novel that cuts across several genres - historical, travel, mystery, and romance - Pulau Renik Ungu depicts Zaidah, a Malaysian university lecturer who travels the world for her doctoral research. Zaidah is born in Sarawak and is keen on unearthing her father's clandestine war-time nationalist activities in Borneo. During her research she encounters Henry, an Australian engineer, on a cruise ship. She discovers that Henry and her friend, Raiman, a banker and politician, share a common English grandfather. The novel also portrays Zaidah's aspirations and career as a female academic, the challenges she faces as a high-educated woman and free spirit. By the end of the novel, Zaidah, Raiman, and Henry find that their past is intertwined in the colonial history in Borneo. She and Henry marry after he converts to Islam.

== Bibliography ==
=== Novels ===
- Pulau Renik Ungu (The Island of the Purple Crocus, 1995)
- Rembang Flamboyan (1995)
- Kembara Seni Siti (1996)
- Zikir Pelangi (The Rainbow, 2000)
- Delima Ranting Senja (2009)

=== Collected short stories ===
- Seri Padma (1984)
- Bunga Putik Putih (1992)
- Attar di Lembah Mawar (1998)

=== Poetry ===
- Bunga-bunga bulan (1980)
- Taman-taman kejadian (1996)
- The Moon is a Candle (1996)

=== Academic publications ===
- Busana Melayu Johor (Fashion in Johorean Malay Society, 1996)
- Kembara Budaya Aceh (1999)

== Honours and awards ==
=== Honours of Malaysia ===
- Federal Territory (Malaysia)
  - Commander of the Order of the Territorial Crown (PMW) – Datuk (2021)
- Selangor
  - Companion of the Order of the Crown of Selangor (SMS) (2002)
  - Recipient of the Meritorious Service Medal (PJK) (1993)

=== Awards of Malaysia ===
- Hadiah Sastera Malaysia (Malaysian Literary Prize)
- AJK Anugerah Seni Negara (National Award for Artistic Achievement) (1996–99)
- S.E.A. Write Award in 1989
- Malaysian National Laureate
