= Khadijah Hashim =

Malaysian writer (born 1942)

- خديجة هاشم
- Born: 20 April 1942 (age 84); Batu Pahat, Johor, Malaysia
- Occupation: Author
- Writing career
- Genres: novel, poetry, rhymes

Khadijah Hashim (born 20 April 1942 in Batu Pahat, Johor, Malaysia) is a Malaysian writer, teacher and journalist. She has worked as a teacher and also as a journalist with local newspapers Utusan Melayu (1974–1976) and Berita Harian (1976–1985). She is better known as a novelist, and has produced 19 novels. She also expanded her creativity in the field of short stories, radio drama scripts, children's books, rhymes and poetry. The children's rhyme book "Sayang Sayang" has been selected to be on Honour List of the International Board on Books for Young People (IBBY) in Basel, Switzerland (2002) and "Semerbak Poetry" in Macau, China (2006). Khadijah continues her interests in writing rhymes, which led to her latest creation of "Putera-puteri Malaysia".

Several of Khadijah's short stories and novels have been adapted to TV dramas. Amongst them were "Mawar Merah di Jambangan", "Sekapur Sirih Segeluk Air", "Ditepi Pagar", and "Badai Semalam" and "Dekat Disayang Jauh Dikenang" novels. "Laila Azwa Gadisku" novel was adapted to television film. Meanwhile, "Mira Edora" and "Pelangi Pagi" novels have been made into movie films with the title of "Mira Edora" and "Bicara Hati" respectively.

Her first and one of her best-known novel "Badai Semalam" (1968) was used as school textbook in Singapore and Malaysia. The novel has been translated into English, "Storms of Yesterday", by Mahani Abdul Hamid in 1991 and Spanish, "Tormentos del ayer", by Alberto Balanza and Yahia in 2010. "Badai Semalam" was republished several times and the latest was in 2006 by Alaf 21 in the nostalgic novel series. The English version was also republished in 2009 by Institut Terjemahan Negara Malaysia under the Malaysian Literature Series.

“Merpati Putih Terbang Lagi" novel won a consolation prize in a writing contest in the celebration of ten years of Malaysia's independence. The novel has also been translated into Japanese by Tatsun Hoshino. "Exiled" novel has been nominated for the International Dublin Literary Award in 1997. Her "Langkah Pertama" novel has won the Mobil-MABOPA Children's Book Award in 1995. Khadijah was the recipient of Southeast Asian Writers Award in 1999 and had undergone the International Writing Program at Iowa University in 1994. Her children's story book series, "Siri Lagenda", "Siri Aura dan Fauna" and "Siri Teladan dari Rimba" have been translated into English by the Institut Terjemahan Negara Malaysia (2009).

== Novels ==
- Badai Semalam, Singapura: Pustaka Nasional, 1968, 201 pages.
- Jalan ke Kubur, Singapura: Pustaka Nasional, 1969, 139 pages.
- Pelangi pagi, Johor Baru, Penerbitan Penamas Malaysia, 1971, 133 pages.
- Merpati Putih Terbang lagi, Kuala Lumpur: Dewan Bahasa dan Pustaka, 1972, 289 pages.
- Belum Masanya, Kuala Lumpur: Penerbitan Utusan Melayu (M) Bhd., 1976, 96 pages.
- Di Tengah Kabus, Singapura: Pustaka Nasional, 1980, 123 pages.
- Bila dan di Mana, Kuala Lumpur: Dewan Bahasa dan Pustaka, 1981, 199 pages.
- Mira Edora, Kuala Lumpur: K Publishing Sdn Bhd, 1984
- Dekat Disayang Jauh Dikenang, Petaling Jaya: `K’ Publishing & Distributors Sdn. Bhd., 1984, 133 pages.
- Laila Azwa Gadisku, Kuala Lumpur: `K’ Publishing & Distributors Sdn. Bhd., 1986, 144 pages.
- Cinta Kedua, Kuala Lumpur: `K’ Publishing & Distributors Sdn. Bhd., 1989
- Alun Hidup, Kuala Lumpur: ‘K’ Publishing & Distributors, 1990, 217 pages.
- Di Ruangmu Aku di Sini, Kuala Lumpur: ‘K’ Publishing & Distributors, 1992
- Ke Mana Kasih Hendak Dibawa, Kuala Lumpur: ‘K’ Publishing & Distributors, 1993, 133 pages.
- Melawan Arus, ‘K’ Publishing & Distributors, 1993, 229 pages.
- Senator Adila, Kuala Lumpur: ‘K’ Publishing & Distributors 1993
- Langkah Pertama, Kuala Lumpur: ‘K’ Publishing & Distributors, 1994, 126 pages.
- Fasa Kedua, Kuala Lumpur: ‘K’ Publishing & Distributors, 1995
- Mencari Azizah, Kuala Lumpur: ‘K’ Publishing & Distributors, 1998

== Short stories ==
- Segeluk Air, Kuala Lumpur: Dewan Bahasa dan Pustaka, 1974, 142 pages.
- Koleksi Cerpen-cerpen Malaysia (antologi bersama), Kuala Lumpur: Penerbitan Universiti Malaya, 1977, 446 pages.
- Cerpen-cerpen ASEAN (antologi bersama), Kuala Lumpur: Dewan Bahasa dan Pustaka, 1978, 279 pages.
- Aku Anak Menteri, Petaling Jaya: Penerbitan Fajar Bakti Sdn. Bhd. 1980, 73 pages.
- Batas Menanti, Kuala Lumpur: Eastern Universities Press (M) Sdn. Bhd., 1982, 95 pages.
- Hawa (antologi bersama), Kuala Lumpur: Dewan Bahasa dan Pustaka, 1984, 250 pages.
- Angin Senja, Petaling Jaya: ‘K’ Publishing & Distributors Sdn. Bhd.. 1985. 93 pages.
- Bujang Kota, Kuala Lumpur: ‘K’ Publishing & Distributors Sdn. Bhd., 1985, 144 pages.
- Dongeng Merdeka (antologi bersama), Petaling Jaya : Penerbit Fajar Bakti Sdn. Bhd., 1985, 339 pages.
- Alun Menggulung Perlahan (antologi bersama), Petaling Jaya : Penerbit Fajar Bakti Sdn. Bhd., 1986, 286 pages.
- Kasih Entah di Mana, Kuala Lumpur: ‘K’ Publishing & Distributors Sdn. Bhd., 2001
- Mawar Merah di Jambagan, Kuala Lumpur: ‘K’ Publishing & Distributors Sdn. Bhd., 2001

== Short Stories for Youths ==
- Mawar Merah di Jambangan, Petaling Jaya: Penerbit Fajar Bakti Sdn. Bhd., 1979, 129 pages.
- Angin dari Sawah, Petaling Jaya: Penerbit Fajar Sdn. Bhd., 1980, 95 pages.
- Arnizah (Peny. bersama Othman Puteh) Petaling Jaya: ‘K’ Publishing & Distributors Sdn. Bhd., 1984, 82 pages.
- Malang Tak Berbau (Peny. Bersama Othman Puteh), Petaling Jaya: ‘K’ Publishing & Distributors Sdn. Bhd., 1984, 54 pages.
- Rahsia Gadis Bisu (Peny. bersama Othman Puteh), Petaling Jaya: ‘K’ Publishing & Distributors Sdn. Bhd., 1984, 61 pages.

== Children's Story Books ==
- Anak Kucing, Petaling Jaya: Penerbit Fajar Bakti Sdn. Bhd., 1983.
- Anak Monyet Mati Ibu, Kuala Lumpur: Eastern Universities Press (M) Sdn. Bhd., 1983.
- Balik Kampung, Petaling Jaya: Penerbit Fajar Bakti Sdn. Bhd., 1983.
- Dua Kali Dibedah, Kuala Lumpur: Eastern Universities Press (M) Sdn. Bhd. 1983.
- Hati Nurani Berdebar, Petaling Jaya: Penerbit Fajar Bakti Sdn. Bhd., 1983.
- Lauk Kenduri, Kuala Lumpur: Eastern Universities Press (M) Sdn. Bhd., 1983.
- Sepatu Bola, Petaling Jaya: Penerbit Fajar Bakti Sdn. Bhd., 1983.
- Tak Susah Sebut ‘R’, Kuala Lumpur: Eastern Universities Press (M) Sdn. Bhd., 1983.
- Siri Citra Sang Unggas: ‘K’ Publishing & Distributors Sdn. Bhd., 2009
  - Dendam Helang
  - Jalak... O..Jalak
  - Hati Kera
  - Helah Murai
  - Gagak Putih
- Siri Cerita Rakyat Si Awang: ‘K’ Publishing & Distributors Sdn. Bhd.
  - Awang dengan Tempayan Buruk
  - Awang Lidi Sebatang
  - Awang dengan Bapa Burung
  - Awang Kenit
  - Awang dengan Gergasi
- Siri Insan Madani: ‘K’ Publishing & Distributors Sdn. Bhd.,
  - Balasan Tsklabah
  - 500 Tahun Beribadat
  - Allah Pencipta Alam
  - Pembukaan Kota Makkah
  - Kasih Sejati
- Siri Kembara Sang Kancil 1: ‘K’ Publishing & Distributors Sdn. Bhd.,
  - Sang Bedal yang Bebal
  - Buluh Berjasa
  - Kepingin Mentimun Muda
- Siri Kembara Sang Kancil 2: ‘K’ Publishing & Distributors Sdn. Bhd.,
  - Gong Berdengung
  - Benkung Bernyawa
  - Dendam Belum Berakhir
- Siri Kembara Sang Kancil 3: ‘K’ Publishing & Distributors Sdn. Bhd.,
  - Sang Bedal Tak Berbudi
  - Mati Hidup Semula
  - Taring Berbisa
- Siri Kembara Sang Kancil 4: ‘K’ Publishing & Distributors Sdn. Bhd.,
  - Kenduri Besar
  - Cikgu Sang Kancil
  - Langit Nak Runtuh
- Siri Kembara Sang Kancil 5: ‘K’ Publishing & Distributors Sdn. Bhd.,
  - Kecundang Sudahnya
  - Bakal Pengantin
  - Hidangan istimewa
- Siri Legenda: ‘K’ Publishing & Distributors Sdn. Bhd.,
  - Si Tanggang
  - Batu Belah Batu Bertangkup
  - Badang
  - Puteri Gunung Ledang
  - Bawang Putih Bawang Merah, Kuala Lumpur
- Siri Teladan dari Rimba: ‘K’ Publishing & Distributors Sdn. Bhd.,
  - Helah Si Bangau Tua
  - Singa Vegetarian
  - Jasa Tikus dan Semut Hitam
  - Burung Hantu Tertipu
  - Gajah dan Ular Buta
- Siri Aura Fauna, ‘K’ Publishing & Distributors Sdn. Bhd., 2008
  - Semut Melancong ke Pulau Pinang
  - Sedap Rumput Enak Lagi Lobak
  - Rama-rama Nakal
  - Itik dan Buaya
  - Mencari Damai
- Siri Sukabaca, ‘K’ Publishing & Distributors Sdn. Bhd., 2010
  - Angsa Berjasa
  - Arnab Buta
  - Misi Katak ke Angkasa
  - Ikan Emas Mangsa Banjir
  - Taat Anjing Manja si Kucing
- The Best Story Ever Told About Series: ‘K’ Publishing & Distributors Sdn. Bhd.,
  - The Boy and the Giant
  - The Boy from the Coconut
  - The Boy and the Parrot
  - The Boy Who Passed the Test
  - The Boy Who Couldn't Lift the Axe
- Siri Pantun Kanak-kanak : ‘K’ Publishing & Distributors Sdn. Bhd.,
  - Mari Berpantun 1
  - Mari Berpantun 2
  - Mari Berpantun 4

== Poetry ==
- 808 Pantun Baru, Kuala Lumpur: ‘K’ Publishing & Distributors Sdn. Bhd., 1997
- 1001 Pantun Baru, Kuala Lumpur: ‘K’ Publishing & Distributors Sdn. Bhd., 1999
- Mastika Warisan, Kuala Lumpur: ‘K’ Publishing & Distributors Sdn. Bhd., 2005
- 1010 Pantun Baru, Kuala Lumpur: ‘K’ Publishing & Distributors Sdn. Bhd., 2010

== Collection of Youth Literatures ==
- Cerdik Tak Berakal (Peny.), Kuala Lumpur: ‘K’ Publishing & Distributors Sdn. Bhd., 1985, 87 pages.
- Ibuku Sayang (Peny.) Kuala Lumpur: ‘K’ Publishing & Distributors Sdn. Bhd., 1985, 90 pages.
- Sayang Telani (Peny.), Kuala Lumpur: ‘K’ Publishing & Distributors Sdn. Bhd., 1985, pages.

== Poem ==
- Semerbak Puisi, Kuala Lumpur: ‘K’ Publishing & Distributors Sdn. Bhd., 2004
- Dua Dimensi Khadijah Hashim (sajak dan lukisan berus Cina), Kuala Lumpur: ‘K’ Publishing & Distributors Sdn. Bhd., 2008
- Puisi Tunas Bangsa, Kuala Lumpur: ‘K’ Publishing & Distributors Sdn. Bhd., 2008
- Putera-puteri Malaysia, ‘K’ Publishing & Distributors Sdn. Bhd., 2010

== Studies ==
- Panduan Menulis Skrip Drama Radio, Kuala Lumpur: ‘K’ Publishing & Distributors, 1986, 136 pages
