= Dina Zaman =

Malaysian writer (born 1969)

Dina Zaman is a Kuala Lumpur-based writer and researcher. She is a co-founder of IMAN Research, a think tank focusing on socio-political and security matters, and a founding member of the Southeast Asian Women Peacebuilders.

She has written extensively for the Malaysian media and is currently a regular contributor to The Star, Malaysia, and The Jakarta Post. Her latest passion projects revolve around Terengganu Royal History.

Dina is the author of three non-fiction titles - I am Muslim (Silverfish Publishing), Holy Men, Holy Women (SIRD) and Malayland (Ethos Books and Faction Press). King of the Sea Redux will be published by Clarity Publishing.

== Key Achievements ==
- Co-founded IMAN Research with Nicholas Chan, Altaf Deviyati and Badrul Hisham Ismail in 2015
- Co-mooted, organised and launched the first Southeast Asian Women Peacebuilders webinar series and network
- Steering Committee for the Southeast Asian Network of Civil Society Organisations Against Violent Extremism
- Strategic partner and Advisor for the National Symposium for the Prevention of Violent Extremism hosted by Minister of Education Malaysia and funded by UNESCO
- Conducted and spoke at several round-table policy discussions with both government and civil society on violent extremism and community resilience
- Launched the ICAN #SheBuildsPeace Campaign in Malaysia in March 2020
- Wrote two non fiction books based on media columns on religions and their place in society, with one to be published in 2023–24.

== Life ==
Dina Zaman's childhood was spent in Japan, Russia and other countries. She studied mass communications and creative writing at Western Michigan University and Lancaster University respectively. In 2007 a collection of her columns for the online newspaper Malaysiakini.com was published in book form as I am Muslim.

In 2012, she published a collection of short stories, King of The Sea. (Silverfish Books, 2012).

Her third book, Holy Men Holy Women, was published in 2017 by SIRD. Her next book, Malayland, will be published in 2024.

She has written extensively for the Malaysian media and is currently a regular contributor to The Star, Malaysia and The Jakarta Post. Her latest passion projects revolve around Terengganu Royal History.

Dina is the author of three non-fiction titles - I am Muslim (Silverfish Publishing), Holy Men, Holy Women (SIRD) and Malayland. King of the Sea (Clarity Publishing) which was earlier published by Silverfish Books in 2012, is a republication of the title.

She has had media presence locally and abroad as a columnist since 1994 and commentator of current affairs since 2005. She has been quoted in the BBC and interviewed on Everywoman, a women's programme on Al Jazeera. She has helmed three columns: Off Our Backs (The Sun, Malaysia in 1995), Dina's Dalca (New Straits Times, 1996 to 1998) and I Am Muslim (www.malaysiakini.com, 2005 to 2006), which is now a book published by Silverfish Books. Her book is now a bestseller at Borders and Kinokuniya bookstores. Her latest book, King of The Sea, is longlisted for the Frank O’Connor Short Story Award. She contributes to The Malaysian Insider and The Star. She writes on religion, society and lifestyle issues, and is known to inject ‘a sense of humour’ in her writing.

She is a recent recipient of the API Senior Fellowship and will be based in Jogjakarta and Thailand by the end of 2012. She was also the recipient of the British High Commissioner Chevening Award in 1998 and came home to Malaysia in 1999 with an MA in creative writing from Lancaster University.

== Works ==
=== Non-fiction ===
- Contributed to CEKU.org, and other publications
- “I am Muslim” – compilation of column essays, published by Silverfish Books in March 2007; published in www.malaysiakini.com from January 2005 to August 2006. The book is now a bestseller.
- “The Young and Ambitious” – Essay for The Road Ahead, a compilation of essays by Malaysian writers, to be published in Australia, 2007
- Contributing columnist for The Star, and also The Malaysian Insider
- Columnist for NST, “Dina's Dalca” – 1996 to 1998
- Columnist for The Sun, “Off Our Backs” - April 1995 to December 1996
- Contributed op-eds for TEMPO Magazine (Indonesia), Halal Journal and various other publications

=== Fiction & Poetry ===
- “King of The Sea” – Silverfish Books, 2012
- “The Road to Elvis and Other Stories” – on going
- “The King of the Sea” published in SARE – the South East Asian Review of English, Journal No. 45, June 2003 (to be out in 2004)
- “Harakiri” produced by Chakra Works, October 2003
- Edited Silverfish Anthology 3 with Dr. Quayum
- Excerpt of novel published in NINETEEN, A Silverfish Book imprint, March 2003
- “And She Became An Angel” translated into Indonesian by Dewi Anggraeni, published in Pesona Magazine, October 2002
- “And She Became An Angel” – shortlisted for Ian St. James Award, London, 1999
- “Gula Girls”, a monologue for Talking AIDs, October 1999
- “Kuala Lumpur” Sudden fiction published in EAST, a regional magazine, September 1999
- “Pickpocket” and “Snapshot of a family holiday” – featured in Manoa, University of Hawaii's literary journal, Summer 1999
- “night & day”, collection of short stories published by Rhino Press - July 1997
- “The Fat Woman”, Men's Review - November 1996
- “The Kacang Puteh and Assam Woman”, Men's Review - August 1996
- “A Drama”, Editor's Choice, National Library of Poetry – 1996
- “After The Doctor's”, monologue for AIDS Memorial Day - May 1996
- “How To Go To Heaven” and “Carpe Diem”, Third and Consolation Prize, SHELL - NST Poetry Competition – 1995
- “Why Did He Sleep With Me If I'm So Fat?” and “Penganggur Terhormat”, monologues for One By One, Dramalab – 1995
- “night & day”, Men's Review - November 1994
- “Philippa”, Skoob Pacifica Anthology Volume 2 – 1994
