= General Secretary of the Communist Party of Malaya =

Highest-ranking political office in the Communist Party of Malaya

General Secretary of Communist Party of Malaya
- 马来亚共产党总书记
- Flag of the Communist Party of Malaya
- Central Committee of the Communist Party of Malaya
- Status: Party leader
- Abbreviation: GS of CPM
- Member of: Politburo; Central Committee
- Reports to: Central Committee
- Seat: Jungle headquarters; later southern Thailand
- Appointer: Central Committee
- Term length: No fixed term
- Formation: 1930
- First holder: Lai Teck
- Final holder: Chin Peng
- Abolished: 1989

The General Secretary of the Communist Party of Malaya was the highest-ranking political leader of the Communist Party of Malaya (CPM). The officeholder exercised supreme authority over political, organizational, and military affairs within the party.

== Party–military structure ==
The CPM operated under a centralized Marxist–Leninist organizational model that merged political and military command.

=== Organizational diagram ===
                Central Committee
                        │
                General Secretary
                        │
        ┌───────────────┼───────────────┐
        │                               │
    Politburo                Military Affairs Bureau
        │                               │
        │                    Malayan National Liberation Army (MNLA)
        │                               │
 Party Departments           Regional Commands / Guerrilla Units
 (Propaganda, Cadre,         (Regiments, Political Commissars)
  United Front, etc.)

== Role in party hierarchy ==
The General Secretary directed the highest decision-making bodies, including the Central Committee and the Politburo, and provided ideological leadership.

== Relationship with military organs ==
The party's armed wing, the Malayan National Liberation Army (MNLA), was subordinate to political leadership.

The General Secretary:

- set overall military strategy
- approved senior commanders
- oversaw political commissars
- coordinated cross-border operations

== History ==
The position was established in 1930. Early leadership was poorly documented.

Lai Teck served from 1939 to 1947, before being exposed as a British agent. A transitional leadership followed, involving senior figures such as Yeung Kwo, Rashid Maidin, and Abdullah CD.

In 1947, Chin Peng took full control of the party and led it during both major insurgencies.

== List of general secretaries ==
No.	Name	Took office	Left office	Status	Notes
–	Early leadership (various)	1930	1939	Collective / unclear	Early CPM organization; records incomplete
1	Lai Teck	1939	1947	Confirmed	Exposed as British informant; disappeared in 1947
–	Yeung Kuo (杨果)	1947	1947	Acting / disputed	Senior cadre involved in reorganizing leadership after Lai Teck
–	Interim collective leadership (including Rashid Maidin, Abdullah CD)	1947	1948	Acting / collective	Transitional leadership before consolidation under Chin Peng
2	Chin Peng	1947	1989	Confirmed	Longest-serving leader; headed CPM during both major insurgencies

== Lesser-known leadership figures ==
=== Yeung Kuo (杨果) ===
Yeung Kuo was a senior CPM cadre active during the 1940s. Following the disappearance of Lai Teck, he played a role in stabilizing the party.

=== Rashid Maidin ===
A prominent Malay communist and MNLA commander. He later served as one of the CPM's representatives during the peace talks.

=== Abdullah CD ===
A major organizer among Malay cadres and later an influential figure in CPM exile communities.

== See also ==
- Communist Party of Malaya
- Malayan Emergency
- Malayan National Liberation Army
- Hat Yai Peace Agreement
