= Communist insurgency in Malaysia (1968–1989) =

Conflict during the Cold War (Asia)

- Part of the Cold War in Asia, the spillovers of Indochina wars and continuation of the Malayan Emergency
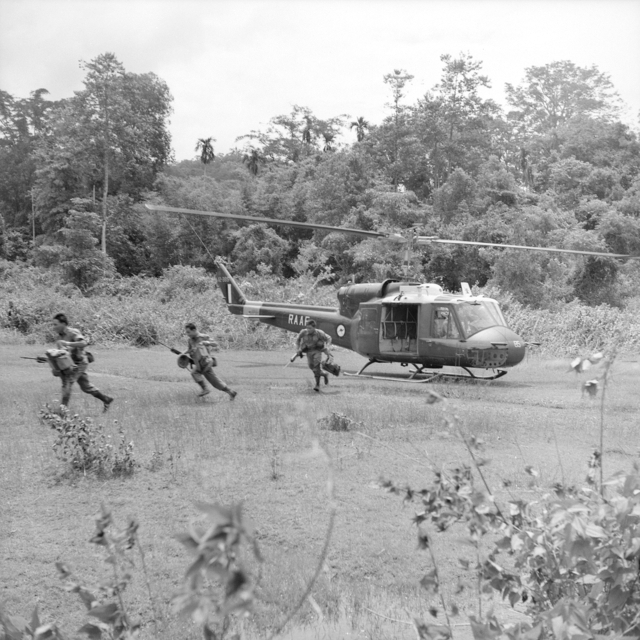
- Sarawak Rangers (present-day part of the Royal Ranger Regiment) consisting of Ibans leap from a Royal Australian Air Force Bell UH-1 Iroquois helicopter to guard the Malay–Thai border from potential Communist attacks in 1965, three years before the war starting in 1968.
Date	17 June 1968 – 2 December 1989 (21 years, 5 months, 2 weeks and 1 day)
Location	Peninsular Malaysia and Sarawak
Result	Peace agreement reached; Communists agree to a ceasefire; Peace Agreement of Hat Yai signed between the Malayan Communist Party and the governments of Malaysia and Thailand; Dissolution of the Malayan Communist Party (MCP); Insurgency continues in Sarawak until 1990

Belligerents
Anti-communist forces: Malaysia; Singapore; Thailand; Supported by: United Kingdom; Australia; New Zealand; Indonesia; Pakistan; Bangladesh; Maldives; Brunei (Partly)	Communist forces: Malayan Communist Party; Malayan National Liberation Army; Communist Party of Malaya/Revolutionary Faction (1970–1983); Communist Party of Malaya/Marxist–Leninist (1974–1983); Malaysian Communist Party (1983–1987); North Kalimantan Communist Party; Communist Party of Thailand (until 1983); Supported by: China (until 1976) Soviet Union; North Korea; Libya; South Yemen

Commanders and leaders
Tunku Abdul Rahman; Abdul Razak Hussein; Hussein Onn; Mahathir Mohamad; Lee Kuan Yew; Thanom Kittikachorn; Thanin Kraivichien; Kriangsak Chamanan; Prem Tinsulanonda	Chin Peng; Abdullah CD; Lee An Tong; Chang Ling-Yun; Wu Yi Shek; Rashid Maidin; Wen Ming Chyuan; Lam Wah Kwai; Bong Kee Chok; Ang Cho Teng; Phayom Chulanont #

Strength
Malaysia 95,000 - 125,000; Thailand 15,000 – 25,000	8,000; 1,000

Casualties and losses
155 killed 854 wounded	212 killed 150 captured 117 surrendered

The Communist insurgency in Malaysia, also known as the Second Malayan Emergency or Second Emergency (Malay: Perang insurgensi melawan pengganas komunis or Darurat Kedua), was an armed conflict which occurred in Malaysia from 1968 to 1989, between the Malayan Communist Party (MCP) and Malaysian federal security forces.

Following the end of the Malayan Emergency in 1960, the predominantly ethnic Chinese Malayan National Liberation Army, armed wing of the MCP, had retreated to the Malaysian-Thailand border where it had regrouped and retrained for future offensives against the Malaysian government. Hostilities officially re-ignited when the MCP ambushed security forces in Kroh–Betong, in the northern part of Peninsular Malaysia, on 17 June 1968. The conflict further coincided with renewed domestic tensions between ethnic Malays and Chinese in Peninsular Malaysia and regional military tensions due to the Vietnam War.

The Malayan Communist Party received some support from the People's Republic of China. The support ended when the governments of Malaysia and China established diplomatic relations in June 1974. In 1970, the MCP experienced a schism which led to the emergence of two breakaway factions: the Communist Party of Malaya/Marxist–Leninist (CPM/ML) and the Communist Party of Malaya/Revolutionary Faction (CPM–RF). Despite efforts to make the MCP appeal to ethnic Malays, the organisation was dominated by Chinese Malaysians throughout the war. Instead of declaring a "state of emergency" as the British had done previously, the Malaysian government responded to the insurgency by introducing several policy initiatives including the Security and Development Program (KESBAN), Rukun Tetangga (Neighbourhood Watch), and the RELA Corps (People's Volunteer Group).

The insurgency ended on 2 December 1989 when the MCP signed a peace accord with the Malaysian government at Hat Yai in southern Thailand. This coincided with the Revolutions of 1989 and the collapse of several prominent communist regimes worldwide. Besides the fighting on the Malay Peninsula, another communist insurgency also occurred in the Malaysian state of Sarawak in the island of Borneo, which had been incorporated into the Federation of Malaysia on 16 September 1963.

== Background ==
During the first Malayan Emergency (1948–1960), the MCP launched an unsuccessful insurrection against the Federation of Malaya. The independence of the Federation of Malaya on 31 August 1957 removed the major cause for the communists as the Federation had gained full autonomy from the United Kingdom. The first Malayan Emergency ended on 31 July 1960. Between 1960 and 1968, the MCP underwent a period of streamlining, retraining, and re-indoctrination of the communist ideology. The Malayan National Liberation Army (MNLA) had established a series of bases along the Malaysian-Southern Thailand border. Despite being weakened by the Commonwealth forces during the first Emergency, the MCP boasted a nucleus of between 500 and 600 well-trained guerrillas and a reserve of about 1,000 men, available for full-time service if required. The MCP had also reorganised its units and reconstituted itself by training new guerrilla fighters. They also developed new techniques of guerrilla warfare after observing the Vietnam War.

The MCP also made efforts to recruit more Malays into their organisation. Despite a small number of Malay personnel, including Abdullah CD and Rashid Maidin, it remained dominated by the Chinese. A special Malay unit, known as the 10th Regiment was established under the leadership of a Central Committee member, Abdullah C.D. Abdullah also established several "Masses Revolutionary School" (Sekolah Revolusi Rakyat) to disseminate Maoist ideas among Thai Malays. Since the MCP was based in southern Thailand, most of its recruits were Thai Malays and people from Kelantan, a northeastern Malaysian state.

To enhance the appeal of the MCP among the Malays, the Islamic Brotherhood Party (Malay: Parti Persaudaraan Islam, PAPERI) was set up as the front organisation of the MCP. PAPERI was responsible for distributing leaflets claiming that there was no incompatibility between Islam and Communism. In July 1961, Chin Peng met Deng Xiaoping in China. Deng had proposed to the MCP that it conduct a second armed struggle. Deng insisted that Malaya was ripe for a revolution. The success of Vietnam War bolstered the MCP to launch another revolt in Malaya. Deng later promised Chin Peng that China would assist the MCP and contribute US$100,000 for the second insurgency in Malaya.

== Early offensive ==
On 1 June 1968, the Central Command of the MCP issued a directive entitled "Hold High the Great Red Banner of Armed Struggle and Valiantly March Forward." The MCP was ready to start a new insurgency in Malaysia. On 17 June 1968, to mark the 20th anniversary of their armed struggle against the Malaysian Government, the MCP launched an ambush against security forces in the area of Kroh–Betong in the northern part of Peninsular Malaysia. They achieved a major success, killing 17 members of the security forces. This event marked the start of the second armed revolt of the MCP. At the initial stage of their second insurgency, the MCP achieved a significant amount of success. Their actions at this stage were bolder and more aggressive causing considerable losses to the security forces. These successes were due to their preparation and the training that they received during the "lull periods" or the reconsolidation period after the end of the first insurgency.

According to Chin Peng, the MCP's ranks had grown to around 1,000 by the period between 1967 and 1968. Following the race riots of the May 13 Incident, underground Communist activists operating in the towns and rural areas launched a word–of–mouth campaign which targeted ethnic Chinese youths who were disaffected with the Alliance government's pro-Malay affirmative action policies particularly the New Economic Policy. By that stage, MNLA numbers had swelled to 1,600 with approximately half of these originating from Peninsular Malaysia and the rest from southern Thailand. While acknowledging the presence of strong racial tensions in Malaysian society, National University of Singapore History Professor Cheah Boon Kheng has contended that the Communist insurgency did not evolve into a racial conflict due to the government and public's preoccupation with the insurgency. They had learned from the past that they could no longer rely on sympathisers from the poor or village people for their food and logistics.

To support the MCP's renewed insurgency, a clandestine radio station known as Suara Revolusi Rakyat (Voice of the People's Revolution) was established in 1969 to cater to Communist cadre throughout Peninsular Malaysia and Singapore. Suara Revolusi was based in Hunan since the People's Republic of China under Mao Zedong was still covertly supporting Maoist guerrilla movements in Southeast Asia including the MCP. The radio station broadcast Maoist propaganda which supported Communist China and the MCP.

Suara's programmes were beamed across the region by a powerful 20-kilowatt transmitter and it was broadcast in three languages: Chinese, Malay, and Tamil. Later, English broadcasts were also added after the MCP succeeded in recruiting several university students from both Singapore and Malaysia. While the Malaysian Special Branch and the Singaporean Internal Security Department regarded the students as Communists, Chin Peng and other MCP leaders believed that most of these student recruits were merely left-wing sympathisers.

In 1969, the Malaysian government responded to the Communist resurgence by establishing its own special forces: VAT 69 Commando, which was modelled after the British Special Air Service (SAS). Most of the recruits came from the Malaysian Police Field Force (PFF). The unit was trained by an SAS training detachment in Ipoh in 1969. By 1972, the British had succeeded in training a full squadron of 104 men. Following the departure of the British SAS team, a training detachment from the New Zealand Special Air Service (NZSAS) took over the training programme and trained another 208 men. The NZSAS also handpicked and trained 13 VAT 69 officers to serve as a VAT 69 training cell, which went on to train a fourth squadron. According to a Central Intelligence Agency report published in April 1976, China limited its involvement in the MCP's insurgency to radio broadcasts from Suara Revolusi. Beijing did not become materially involved in this conflict and would later establish diplomatic relations with Kuala Lumpur in June 1974. The Soviet Union and Democratic Republic of Vietnam also did not become involved in the Malaysian insurgency.

== MCP internal conflicts ==
In early 1970, the MCP experienced a major crisis within the party. Internal disputes due to the counterintelligence problems posed by the Special Branch had caused severe conflicts among the MCP members. During this period, it was reported that the government agents and spies had succeeded in infiltrating the MCP organisation. It was reported that the "spies" were plotting a coup within the MCP Headquarters. According to Chin Peng, the counterintelligence investigators appointed by the MCP Central Committee reported that they believed that 90 percent of the Thai Chinese recruits who joined the party from 1960 onward were government spies.

Members in the militant wing started to accuse each other as government spies. Betrayal in guerrilla ranks was regarded as the most serious crime against the party and the punishment was normally death by execution. During the jungle trial held by the MCP leadership, a large number of guerrillas from Headquarters and Betong East Camp were found guilty of being enemy agents. However, the Sadao and the West Betong Group refused to conduct such trials. Instead, they refused to adhere to the MCP Central Committee orders. They in fact made an accusation that the MCP Central Committee was under the control of government agents.

In 1970, a leadership struggle within the MCP led to the emergence of two break–away factions: the Communist Party of Malaya–Marxist-Leninist (CPM–ML) and the Revolutionary Faction (CPM–RF). This caused the Communist movement in Peninsular Malaysia to splinter into three different groups. Each of these factions had their own armed forces and front organisation. The MRLA in the northern part of Malaysia near the Thailand border were located in three places. The MCP Central Committee was with the East Betong Group, and the other two groups were located at West Betong and Sadao.

When the crisis was getting worse, the Sadao groups broke away from the main MCP groups and proclaimed themselves as the MCP Revolutionary Faction (RF). Subsequently, the Betong West group, who also broke from the main MCP groups, identified their party as the MCP "Marxist–Leninist" (M-L) and later renamed their guerrilla arm as the Malayan People's Liberation Army (MPLA) instead of the Malayan National Liberation Army.

In 1973, the CPM implemented a new strategy calling for their military activities to be coordinated with those of front organisations. Later in January 1975, the CPM also issued a second directive calling for 1975 to be "a new year combat." These directives led to increased CPM operations in Malaysia between 1974 and 1975, though it did not reach Emergency-era levels. According to a Central Intelligence Agency National Intelligence Estimate in April 1976, the CPM's increased activities were meant to demonstrate to the Malaysian government and public that it was still committed to continuing its revolutionary struggle despite the establishment of diplomatic ties between Malaysia and the People's Republic of China in June 1974.

Some observers believed that this new revolutionary struggle was initiated with the influence of the Socialist Republic of Vietnam. They believed that the Vietnam Communist Party, backed by the Soviet Union, had agreed to provide logistical and propaganda support to the "new faction" groups, such as Betong West and Sadao Group. Later it was found out that the Betong West and the Sadao Group ceased to exist not long after they broke away from the main groups. These groups realised that their armed struggles could not achieve any success. The West Betong and the Sadao groups then decided to surrender themselves to the Thai Government in early 1987. After that time, the MCP armed struggle disintegrated with no clear political or military objective.

By April 1976, Malaysian government sources and the CIA estimated that there were at least 2,400 Communist insurgents in Peninsular Malaysia: 1,700 members in the original MCP, 300 in the CPM-RF, and 400 in the CPM-ML. Despite efforts by the MCP to recruit more Malay members, it was estimated in 1976 that less than 5 percent of the organisation's members were ethnic Malays originating in Malaysia. Meanwhile, it was estimated that 69 percent of the MCP's members were ethnic Chinese and that 57 percent of the organisation's members were Thai nationals, which also included both ethnic Chinese and Malays.

== The Security and Development Programme (KESBAN) ==
Learning from the Briggs Plan, the Malaysian Government understood the importance of security and development and how it could be used against the MCP insurgency. The Malaysian Government, then, introduced a new strategy of fighting the MCP. It was known as Security and Development Programme, or KESBAN, the local acronym (Program Keselamatan dan Pembangunan), and focused on civil military affairs. KESBAN constituted the sum total of all measures undertaken by the Malaysian Armed Forces and other (government) agencies to strengthen and protect society from subversion, lawlessness, and insurgency which effectively broke the resistance. Undoubtedly the Malaysian authorities found that security and development were the most prudent approaches to combating the Communist insurgency.

The KESBAN programs succeeded in developing Malaysia into a more stable and secure society. Malaysia basically had institutionalised the concept of KESBAN, with the establishment of coordinated bodies from the village, district, and state to the federal levels. All the relevant agencies were represented and this enabled problems to be discussed and resolved through joint consultation. The government made large efforts to develop rural areas with the implementation of massive development programs such as building roads, schools, hospitals, medical clinics, and public utilities like electricity and water supply. Major projects under the KESBAN programme were the East-West Highway and the Temenggor, Pedu and Muda dams.

The government also instituted other security measures to meet the MCP menace, including strict press censorship, increasing the size of the police force, resettling squatters, and relocating villages in "insecure" rural areas. By mid-1975, when the MCP militant activities were at a peak, the government promulgated a set of Essential Regulations, without declaring a state of emergency. The Essential Regulations provided for the establishment of a scheme called a "Rukun Tetangga", Rela (People's Volunteer Group). The concept of Rukun Tetangga (Neighborhood Watch) had made the Malays, Chinese, and Indians grow closer together, and more tolerant of each other.

The Malaysian Government made the decision not to declare a state of emergency during the second insurgency. The reason was a desire to avoid aggravating the fears of the populace (leading to increase in ethnic antipathy) and to avoid scaring away needed foreign investment. When Mahathir Mohamad took over as the Malaysian Prime Minister in July 1981, he succeeded in making Malaysia one of the fastest developing nations in Asia. The annual growth of the Malaysian economy rose up to 8 percent.

The MNLA also tried to win the support of the Orang Asli, a group of aboriginal peoples native to Peninsular Malaysia. They consisted of three main groups: the Jahai, the Temiar, and the Senoi and lived in the remote jungle interior of the peninsula. During the Malayan Emergency, both the Malayan government and the MNLA had competed for the support and loyalty of the Orang Asli communities. Orang Asli were used by both sides as guides, medical orderlies, couriers and to grow agricultural crops. The Malayan government made efforts to win the support of the Orang Asli by establishing an Orang Asli Affairs Department and the Senoi Praaq regiment for hunting Communist forces. Meanwhile, the MNLA also formed ASAL groups to serve as couriers and to cultivate agricultural crops. Following the end of the Emergency in 1960, the Orang Asli had been neglected and this made them reluctant to support the Malaysian government during the 1970s. In September 1974, the Senoi Praaq Regiment was absorbed into the Royal Malaysian Police and was based in Kroh, Perak. Due to its success against MNLA forces, another Senoi Praaq Battalion was formed in Bidor, Perak.

== Road to peace accord ==
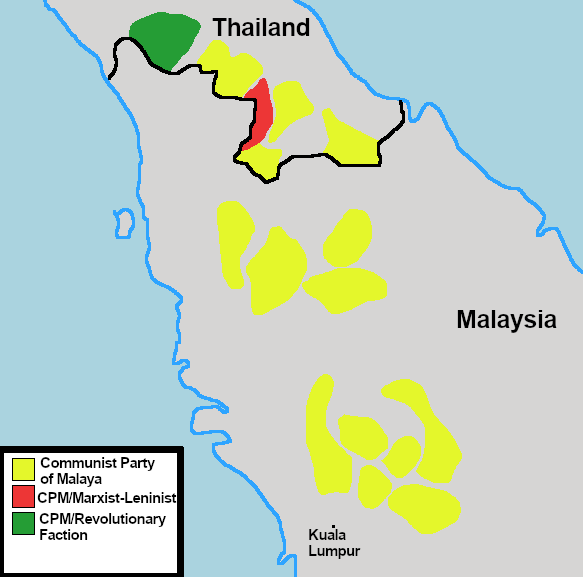
Communist Party of Malaya in Malaysia and Southern Thailand in 1977

Since 1974, Malaysia had established a bilateral relationship with China. The Malaysian Government urged the leaders of China to exert influence on the MCP leadership to convince them to lay down their arms. During Mahathir Mohamad's premiership, he initiated an effort to bring MCP to negotiation table to end the insurgency. Mahathir believed that the MCP was fighting a losing battle and urged them to lay down their arms and join the other Malaysians in developing the country.

In 1988, the MCP leadership in the northern part of Malaysia agreed with the Malaysian government offer to attend a negotiation to a peace initiative. The MCP, which by that time was in a desperate situation to continue their armed struggle agreed with the proposal. Furthermore, since early 1981, Deng Xiaoping had encouraged them to seek a peace accord with the Malaysian government.

When the Communist bloc in Europe collapsed in the late 1980s, the MCP had accepted the fact that they did not have any chance to form a communist government in Malaya. Malaysia by that time was one of the newly developed nations in Asia. Malaysia's economy was strong and the majority of Malaysia's citizens refused to accept communist ideology. After a series of negotiations between the Malaysian Government and the MCP, with the Thais acting as mediators, the MCP finally agreed to sign a Peace Accord in Haadyai, Thailand on 2 December 1989.

The peace accord did not require the MCP to surrender; it only required that the MCP cease their militant activities. With the signing of the Haadyai Peace Accord, the MCP agreed to disband their armed units and destroy all of their weapons. They also 'pledged their loyalty' to His Majesty the Yang di Pertuan Agong of Malaysia. This date marked the end of the MCP insurgency in Malaysia.

At the end of the peace accord, it was estimated that there were about 1,188 MCP members still on the active list. Some of them chose to return to their states in Malaysia and the rest selected to stay in a "Peace Village" at the Thai border. The Malaysian Government had paid them all some compensation money. First RM 3,000 was paid on their immediate return, and another RM 5,000 was paid three years after their return.

Under the terms of the agreement, Chin Peng was one of the MCP officials who would be allowed to return home. However, successive Malaysian administration blocked his return on a number of justifications. In 2005, his petition to enter Malaysia was formally rejected by the High Court. In June 2008, a Court of Appeal also rejected his petition, upholding an earlier ruling compelling him to show identification papers to prove citizenship; Chin claimed he could not because they were seized in a 1948 police raid.

Chin died in Bangkok, Thailand on 16 September 2013, and was cremated according to Buddhist rites. While he has previously voiced the wish to be buried in Sitiawan, Perak, his remains continued to be denied entry to Malaysia, as its government claimed that the one-year window after the agreement to reapply for citizenship had long lapsed and he had relinquished his rights to return. His ashes would eventually be returned to Malaysia in November 2019.

== The Sarawak Insurgency ==
Besides the main Communist insurgency in Peninsular Malaysia, another one occurred in Sarawak, one of Malaysia's Borneo states. Between 1962 and 1990, the North Kalimantan Communist Party (SCO) or the Communist Clandestine Organisation (CCO) fought a guerrilla war against the Malaysian government. The SCO entered into peace negotiations with the Malaysian government in 1990, which led to a peace agreement on 17 October 1990 which finally ended all hostilities.

== See also ==
- Australian Rifle Company Butterworth
- Communist insurgency in Sarawak
- Communist insurgency in Thailand
- East–West Highway
- Kanang anak Langkau
- Mahmud Sulaiman
- Malayan Communist Party
- Malayan Emergency (1948–1960)
- Malaysian Army
- Malaysian Special Branch

== Bibliography ==
- Talib, Nazar Bin (2005). Malaysia's Experience In War Against Communist Insurgency And Its Relevance To The Present Situation In Iraq (PDF) (Working Paper thesis). Marine Corps University. Archived from the original on 4 June 2011.
- Peng, Chin (2003). My Side of History. Singapore: Media Masters. ISBN 981-04-8693-6.
- Navaratnam, A. (2001). The Spear and the Kerambit: The Exploits of VAT 69, Malaysia's Elite Fighting Force, 1968–1989. Kuala Lumpur: Utusan Publications and Distributions. ISBN 967-61-1196-1.
