= R. G. Balan =

Malaysian communist (born 1921)

R. G. Balan (born 22 November 1921, date of death unknown) was of the Malayan Peoples' Anti-Japanese Army. He worked underground in Tapah-Kampar area as a Communist Party of Malaya's Tamil publicist during the Japanese occupation of Malaya. He was a close friend with Abdullah CD and Suriani Abdullah, whom both of them were also active members of Communist Party of Malaya.

== Personal life ==
Balan was born Raja Gopal in Nova Scotia Estate, Teluk Intan on 22 November 1921, to a Ceylonese father and an Indian mother.

Balan had a son, Gunallan. His mother was V. Sinnathayamma. He had a brother, Thirunoyam and a sister, Suppammal. His father died in 1958.

R. G. Balan died prior to February 2002.

== Involvement in politics ==
In 1947, R.G Balan, along with Rashid Maidin and Wu Tien Wang, attended the Communist Parties Conference of Commonwealth Nations in London, as representatives of the Communist Party in Malaya. After his return, he organised the Perak Rubber Labourers Union. R.G. Balan remained as a labour organiser until he was detained without trial by the colonial authority on 30 May 1948 and not released until 1961.

In 1955, while he was under detention, R.G. Balan was appointed a vice chairman of the Central Committee of the Communist Party of Malaya. They first met R.G. Balan in Ipoh immediately after the war had ended, when most of the underground party members emerged as victors of the Pacific War in Malaya.
