= Alias Chin Peng: My Side of History =

2003 autobiography of Chin Peng

- Author: Chin Peng, Ian Ward, Norma Mirflor
- Language: English
- Subject: History, Malayan Emergency
- Genre: Biography
- Publisher: Media Masters
- Publication date: 2003
- ISBN: 978-9810486938

Alias Chin Peng: My Side of History (2003) is the auto-biography of Malaysian communist leader Chin Peng, the former leader of the Malayan Communist Party who led the Malayan resistance against Japan during World War II, the resistance against the British occupation of Malaya during the Malayan Emergency, and later led communist forces during the Communist insurgency in Malaysia (1968–1989).

After arriving at a peace deal with the government of Malaysia, Chin Peng travelled to Britain where he accessed British government and military archives to create a biography and history of the Malayan Emergency. Assisting him was former Telegraph journalist Ian Ward and his wife Norma Miraflor. Since its creation, it has become a key text in the historiography of the Malayan Emergency.

== History ==
The Telegraph newspaper reported that copies of My Side of History had been seized by the Malaysian government. However the Malaysian Home Ministry later gave a statement saying that the book had not been banned.

In 2007 the book was translated into Chinese.

== Reception ==
The book received a generally positive reception.

Journalist Ted Grundy described the book as a "must-read".

British activist leader Peter Taaffe described the book as an important read for the study of anti-colonialism.

Historian Karl Hack described the book as giving a unique look into the historiography of the Malayan Emergency.

Fadiah Nadwa Fikri of the National University of Singapore gave the book an overwhelmingly positive review.

The BBC's Malaysian correspondent Jonathan Kent said that the book revived interest in the history of the Malayan Emergency.

Historian Dan Poole wrote that despite Peng not being a historian, his book contained "ground-breaking" research on the British Malayan headhunting scandal.
