= Yeung Kwo =

Malaysian politician (1919–1956)

- 杨果

Deputy Secretary-General of the Malayan Communist Party
- In office 6 March 1947 – 26 August 1956
- Secretary-General: Chin Peng
- Preceded by: Chin Peng
- Succeeded by: Lee An Tong

Member of the Politburo of the Malayan Communist Party
- In office July 1946 – 26 August 1956

Personal details
- Born: 1919 Jinjiang County, Fujian Province, Republic of China
- Died: 26 August 1956 (aged 36–37) Broga, Selangor, Federation of Malaya
- Party: Communist Party of Malaya
- Education: Chung Ling High School

Yeung Kwo (simplified Chinese: 杨果; traditional Chinese: 楊果; pinyin: Yáng Guǒ; 1919 – 26 August 1956) was a prominent member of the Malayan Communist Party. He served as Deputy Secretary General of the Malayan Communist Party from 1947 to 1956.

== Biography ==
Born in Jinjiang, Fujian Province, China in 1919. He came to Malaya at a young age and settle in his aunt's house in Penang. He received his education at the Chung Ling High School and was later influenced by the sentiments of the Second Sino-Japanese War which motivated him to join the Malayan Communist Party.

In 1938, he was appointed to lead the Penang City Committee of the CPM. In 1940, he was sent to Singapore and on the next year he was arrested. During the Anti-Japanese resistance in Japanese-occupied Malaya, he was task to lead the CPM's activities in Selangor.

After the war, he was appointed to the interim Central Executive Committee and in 1946 he became a former member of the Central Executive Committee of the Malayan Communist Party. He was an opponent of Lai Teck, the party's secretary general until 1947. He was elected as Deputy General Secretary in June 1947. While Chin Peng was abroad from July till August 1947, he became Acting General Secretary of the CPM. After Emergency was declared, he was based in Selangor, leading the Central Malayan Bureau and the South Malayan Bureau. Around 1952 to 1953, he remained in Selangor while most of the high-ranking leaders of the CPM and MNLA started to move northwards to the Malayan–Thai border. While he was searching for food for the MNLA soldiers, he was ambushed and killed by British Security Forces on 26 August 1956 in Broga, near the border of Selangor and Negeri Sembilan. After his death he was succeeded by Lee An Tong in December 1960.
