= Malaysian Communist Party =

- Malay name: Parti Komunis Malaysia
- Chinese name: 马来西亚共产党; Má-lâi-se-a Kiōng-sán-tóng; Maa5 Loi4 Sai1 Aa3 Gung6 Caan2 Dong2; Mǎláixīyǎ gòngchǎndǎng
- Tamil name: மலேசிய கம்யூனிஸ்ட் கட்சி
- General Secretary: Zhang Zhong Min (Ah Ling)
- Founded: 5 December 1983
- Dissolved: April 28, 1987
- Merger of: Communist Party of Malaya/Revolutionary Faction and Communist Party of Malaya/Marxist–Leninist
- Headquarters: West Betong District, Thailand
- Armed wing: Malaysian People's Liberation Army
- Front organisation: Malaysian People's Liberation League
- Radio station: Voice of the People of Malaysia
- Ideology: Communism; Marxism–Leninism

The Malaysian Communist Party (MCP) was a merger of the Communist Party of Malaya/Marxist-Leninist (CPM-ML) and the Communist Party of Malaya/Revolutionary Faction (CPM-RF). Both factions split out from the Malayan Communist Party in the 1970s. MCP traced its roots to splinter groups amongst communist guerrillas in southern Thailand in the 1970s. The party conducted armed struggle in the Malaysian-Thai border areas between 1983 and 1987. The former CPM-RF members lay down their arms on 13 March 1987 and the former CPM-ML members lay down theirs on 28 April 1987. It eventually accepted a deal for cessation of hostilities with the Thai military and its cadres were resettled in 5 'friendship villages'.

== Foundation ==
The party was formed on 5 December 1983 through the merger of two Communist Party of Malaya splinter groups; the Communist Party of Malaya/Revolutionary Faction and the Communist Party of Malaya/Marxist–Leninist. The two key leaders of MCP were Ah Leng (General Secretary of the party, hailing from CPM/ML) and Huang Chen (former CPM/RF leader).

MCP traced its roots to a crisis in the CPM in the Thai–Malaysian border regions following a 1968–1970 internal purge. Up to 200 cadres were estimated to have killed in the purge, resulting in two out of four guerrilla camps of the Malayan National Liberation Army in the area rebelling against the CPM leadership. In 1970 the Sadao Camp of the 8th MNLA regiment broke away, forming CPM/RF. Later the second district of the 12th MNLA regiment, based at the Betong West Camp, broke away and formed CPM/ML. Both CPM/RF and CPM/ML repeatedly denounced the CPM leader Chin Peng as counter-revolutionary. MCP called on CPM members to join the new party.

The merger of CPM/RF and CPM/ML had been preceded by failed reconciliation talks in Beijing between the CPM and the break-away groups.

== Political line ==
MCP sought to apply Marxism–Leninism to Malaysian conditions. Both of the founding factions of MCP had rejected the application of the Maoist line of encircling the cities from the country-side in Malaysian context, as the peasantry was predominantly Malay whilst communist cadres were predominantly Chinese. MCP sought to gain support from both Chinese urban workers as well as Malay peasants. MCP called for the building of a people's democratic united front to defeat 'the reactionary Kuala Lumpur regime'. The party argued that "[t]he reactionary Kuala Lumpur regime is using various means to implement its suppressive, discriminatory, and divide-and-rule policy and is deliberately pitting various groups against one another and destroying the harmony among these groups. Furthermore, they are colluding more actively with foreign monopolistic and capitalistic groups and developing through various means bureaucratic, monopolistic capitalists, accelerating the new economic policy, and crazily confiscating and selling the country's natural resources."

After the founding of the party the adoption of a new party constitution and a party programme for New Democratic Revolution were announced. The latter document, adopted at the first sitting of the MCP Central Committee on 5 December 1983 contained ten points; including the 'overthrow the reactionary regime, bureaucratic capitalists, feudalism and imperialism', establishment of a People's Republic of Malaysia, abolishing 'all reactionary laws', respect of religious freedom, confiscating companies under foreign monopoly capital and bureaucratic monopoly capital, seize lands occupied by big landlords (but not lands owned by wealthy farmers, tani kaya), redistributing already nationalised lands to landless peasants, eradicate forced labour, equality of all nationalities of Malaysia, oppose imperialism and neo-colonialism, upholding proletarian internationalism.

Moreover, whilst CPM insisted on organising in both in the (Malaysian part of) Malaya and Singapore, MCP acknowledged the Malaysian statehood and the political separation between Malaysia and Singapore.

== Organisation and auxiliary bodies ==
MCP was estimated to have around 800 fighters, according to Thai military sourced quoted in the Bangkok Post the MCP merger brought together some 500 guerrilla fighters from CPM/ML and some 300 guerrilla fighters from the CPM/RF (whilst the original CPM was estimated to have between 800 and 1,300 fighters at the time). MCP had an armed wing, the Malaysian People's Liberation Army (MPLA). It had a front organisation, named the Malaysian People's Liberation League (previously known as the Malayan People's Liberation Union, the erstwhile front organisation of CPM/ML).

It ran a clandestine radio broadcast from southern Thailand, named the 'Voice of the People of Malaysia' (previously the 'Voice of the People of Malaya', new name announced 11 December 1983). The Voice of the People of Malaysia was broadcast in Malay, Standard Chinese, Cantonese and Tamil.

== Thai offensive against MPLA ==
With the establishment of diplomatic relations between Thailand and the People's Republic of China in 1976 and the cessation of Chinese logistic support for the Communist Party of Thailand in 1981, the Thai authorities were emboldened to confront the communist armed forces in the country. A joint military-civilian campaign against the MCP was launched, modelled after a similar campaign against Thai communist insurgents in north-eastern Thailand. In particular the Second MPLA Military District was affected by the Thai campaign. On 28 December 1983, the Thai military announced a joint Malaysian-Thai offensive in the border areas.

In 1984 and 1985 Thai authorities sent out peace feelers to MCP.

== Surrender ==
On 14 April 1987, the Voice of the People of Malaysia announced an agreement between the MPLA and the Thai authorities, whereby MPLA would cease its armed struggle whilst the Thai authorities would respect the 'dignity of [the MPLA] members'. As per the announcement, on 27 and 28 April 1987 some 700 MPLA guerrillas were expected to surrender to the Fourth Army Region of the Royal Thai Army. On 26 April 1987, Voice of the People of Malaysia announced that the radio broadcasts would cease the following day.

Notably the agreement to cease hostilities was done between the two military forces (Second Military District of the MPLA and the Fourth Army Region of the Royal Thai Army respectively), rather than on political level. In doing so the Thai government avoided the issue of having accorded legitimacy to a communist insurgent force from a neighbouring country. In exchange for cessation of hostilities MPLA guerrillas were settled in 'friendship villages' in southern Thailand and were given guarantees against deportation to Malaysia.

On 28 April 1987, some 542 MPLA guerrillas (537 according to another account) emerged from the jungle. 252 of the guerrillas who surrendered were women. They surrendered their equipment to the Thai forces. A reconciliation ceremony was held outside of Betong, presided over by the Commander of the Fourth Army Region Lt.-Gen. Visith Artkhumwong and attended by Thai military and civilian officials.

The former MCP/MPLA guerrillas were resettled five peace villages; four along the road between Betong and Yala and one in Sadao.
