= 10th Malay Regiment =

Malaysian militant Communist group (1949–1989)

- Rejimen Ke-10
- Flag of the MNLA's 10th Malay Regiment
- Leaders: Abdullah CD; Rashid Maidin
- Dates active: 1949–1989
- Allegiance: Malayan Communist Party: Malayan National Liberation Army
- Active regions: Northern Malaya and Southern Thailand
- Ideology: Communism; Marxism–Leninism; Mao Zedong Thought; Anti-imperialism
- Political position: Far-left

The 10th Malay Regiment (Malay: Rejimen Ke-10) was the only predominantly Malay regiment of the Malayan National Liberation Army (MNLA), the armed wing of the Malayan Communist Party (CPM). Other regiments of the MNLA were predominantly Chinese. Headed by Abdullah CD and Rashid Maidin, the regiment fought against the British occupation of Malaysia after World War II.

== History ==
The 10th Malay Regiment was established on 21 May 1949 in Kerdau, Temerloh District, in the state of Pahang. The regiment was headed by Abdullah CD, with Rashid Maidin serving as adviser to Chin Peng, the CPM’s Secretary General.
