= Suriani Abdullah =

Malaysian Communist

- Born: Eng Ming Ching; 23 January 1925; Sitiawan, Manjung, Perak, Malaya
- Died: 20 March 2013 (aged 88); Sukhirin, Thailand
- Occupation: Writer
- Spouse: Abdullah CD (m. 1955–2013)
- Children: 1 daughter

Suriani Abdullah (born Eng Ming Ching; 23 January 1925 – 20 March 2013) was a former central committee member of the Communist Party of Malaya.

== Background ==
Suriani was born on 23 January 1925 in Sitiawan, Perak. She attended Nan Hwa High School, where she met other communists such as Tu Lung Shan and Chin Peng, and was politically radicalised. In 1940, Suriani joined the underground Communist Party of Malaya and was actively involved in mobilising and organising women workers in the Kinta Valley. She was elected a member of the Central Committee Member in 1975.

She is the author of Rejimen Ke-10 dan Kemerdekaan (The 10th Regiment and Independence), the official historical account of the 10th Regiment of the Malayan People's National Liberation Army, and Memoir Suriani Abdullah: Setengah Abad Perjuangan (The Memoirs of Suriani Abdullah: A Half-Century Struggle).

== Later life and death ==
She resided in Chulaporn Village No. 12 in Sukhirin, Thailand with her husband, Abdullah CD, with their daughter and her family until her death on 20 March 2013.
