= Mahmud Sulaiman =

Major-General Mahmud Sulaiman (c. 1928 – 26 August 2020) was a Malaysian general officer. He has been credited for the Malaysian military's success in purging the remnants of the Malayan Communist Party guerrillas in the 1970s, at the height of the Communist insurgency in Malaysia (1968–89). Mahmud's leadership style reportedly focused on constant evaluation of his subordinates; evaluation reports were commonly disregarded by other Malaysian military leaders. His military career took off when Mahmud was personally selected by then British High Commissioner to Malaya Gerald Templer to study in Sandhurst in the 1950s.

Mahmud's strategy in prosecuting the Insurgency War was to reduce the number of insurgents through peaceful means by, in the words of one commentator, giving them "every chance to surrender and escape from being killed". Mahmud reportedly "saw immense propaganda value in former terrorists who were now alive, repentant, and leading full productive lives", he analogised the war to exterminating rats. Poisoning and killing them would not work as long as they reproduced; instead by attacking the root causes such as the habitat, the rats could be extinguished. His strategy was approved of by civilian superiors such as the later Prime Minister Mahathir Mohamad.

Mahmud was born in Batu Pahat. He died in Kuala Lumpur on 26 August 2020 at the age of 92.
