= Insurgency in Malaya =

Insurgency in Malaya may refer to one of the following Communist insurgencies:

- The Malayan Emergency from 1948 until 1960
- Communist insurgency in Malaysia (1968–89)
