= Rashid Maidin =

Malaysian communist leader

- Rashid Maidin, in uniform
- Born: 10 October 1917; Kampung Gunung Mesah, Gopeng, Perak, Federated Malay States, British Malaya
- Died: 1 September 2006 (aged 88); Si Sakhon District, Narathiwat, Thailand
- Children: 3 sons; 2 daughters
- Military career
- Allegiance: Malayan Peoples Anti-Japanese Army; Malayan Communist Party; Malayan National Liberation Army
- Service years: 37 years
- Rank: Commander
- Conflicts: Resistance against the Japanese occupation of Malaya (1941-1945); Malayan Emergency (1948-1960); Communist insurgency in Malaysia (1968–1989)

Rashid Maidin (10 October 1917 – 1 September 2006), sometimes given as Rashid Mahideen, was a senior leader of the Communist Party of Malaya (CPM).

== Personal life ==
He was born in Kampung Gunung Mesah, Gopeng, Perak on 10 October 1917. He was the eldest brother of 7 brothers and 1 sister. He received his early education at the Gunung Panjang Malay School and the Kampung Gunung Mesah Madrasah, which were both in Gopeng. He graduated at standard 5 in a Malay school. However, due to poverty Rashid dropped out of school in 1929.

After leaving school, Rashid travelled and sought employment, ending up in Cameron Highlands, Pahang. While working odd jobs there, he befriended a Christian missionary who taught him to speak basic English. He furthered his proficiency in the language via correspondence courses. Later, Rashid returned to Gopeng and worked at a French-owned power station. While employed at the power station, he studied basic electrics and eventually obtained a first-class electrical chargeman certificate.

He started a family with Hamidah binti Abdul Rashid, a village girl in 1938. They had 4 children, 3 sons and a daughter. His second marriage was in 1959, with Selamah binti Abdullah, a comrade and party cadet. They were gifted another daughter.

== Involvement in politics ==
Rashid was also active in the trade unions, which led him to join the CPM as the party's first Malay member. In his memoir, Memoir Rashid Maidin: Daripada Perjuangan Bersenjata Kepada Perdamaian (The Memoirs of Rashid Maidin: From Armed Struggle to Peace), Rashid justified his decision to join the CPM due to the party's strong anti-imperialist stance. CPM was amongst the first anti-colonial movements in Malaya. Ever since his youth, Rashid was inspired by the story of Maharajalela's anti-colonial resistance against the British in Perak. In 1939 he began to get involved with the Malayan Communist Party (CPM) and soon after in 1941, he became an official member of the party. He was renowned for being the first Malay to join the CPM.

In 1941, the Imperial Japanese Army invaded and occupied Malaya. The CPM, of which Rashid was one of their highest-ranking Malay leaders, organised armed resistance via the Malayan People's Anti-Japanese Army (MPAJA). At the end of the anti-Japanese resistance, he met Abdullah CD.

After the return of British rule, the CPM continued its armed insurrection, this time against the British colonial government, via its new militant wing, the Malayan National Liberation Army (MNLA). Rashid was entrusted by CPM leader Chin Peng to lead the MNLA's Malay-dominated 10th Regiment alongside Abdullah CD. In 1947, he was one of the representatives from the CPM to attend a council communist party meeting in London. This meeting was participated by communist movements within the colonial country to discuss their strategy to resist British colonialism for the right of independence. CPM's armed insurrection led the British to declare a state of emergency, lasting from 1948 to 1960. In July 1948, he was captured by the British in Sungai Manik, Perak. He was subsequently jailed for 3 and a half years. In early 1952, Rashid succeeded in freeing himself, and in late 1952, he met his companion, Abdullah CD, in Pahang. Afterwards in 1953, together with the 10th Regiment, he retreated to the borders of Malaysia-Thailand. He was wounded in his leg during a battle against the British.

In 1955, the CPM attempted to negotiate peace with the colonial government. Rashid was a member of the CPM delegation at the Baling Talks, which were held in the town of Baling, Kedah. After the collapse of the talks, the CPM continued its insurrection. Between 1961 and 1972, he led the 10th Regiment of the National Liberation Army's Special Unit at the borders of Kedah-Thailand. However, due to government anti-insurrection measures, CPM's guerilla struggle gradually waned and eventually ended in the signing of a peace treaty with the Malaysian government in Haadyai, Thailand in 1989. Rashid was again a CPM delegate to the peace treaty.

In January 2006, 500 former members of the Malayan Communist party were granted Thai citizenship. In the past, Rashid had failed to acquire Malaysian citizenship, like many other ex-communists living in Southern Thailand. However, a stipulation in the treaty signed disallowed former senior CPM leaders from returning to Malaysia; hence, Rashid settled for a quiet, post-guerrilla life in Southern Thailand. He died on 1 September 2006 in Si Sakhon, Narathiwat, and was buried after the Friday prayers on the same day.
