= Lee An Tong =

Former secretary-general of the Malayan Communist Party

- 李安东

Deputy Secretary General of the Malayan Communist Party
- In office 23 December 1960 – 2 December 1989
- Preceded by: Yeung Kwo
- Succeeded by: None ("party dissolved")

Member of the Politburo of the Malayan Communist Party
- In office July 1946 – 2 December 1989

Personal details
- Born: 8 February 1917 Chaoan County, Guangdong Province, Republic of China
- Died: 15 July 1999 (aged 82) Yala, Yala Province, Thailand
- Party: Communist Party of Malaya

Lee An Tong (Chinese: 李安东; 8 February 1917 – 15 July 1999) was a prominent member of the Malayan Communist Party. He served as Deputy Secretary General of the Malayan Communist Party from 1960 to 1989.

== Early life and education ==
He was born in Chaoan, Guangdong Province, China on the 17th day of the first month of the lunar calendar in 1917. He migrated with his mother to Singapore in 1922 to reunite with his father. He only received primary and secondary of Chinese education due to his poor financial situation of his family. In 1935, he graduated from High School in Shantou and later became a primary school teacher which he taught in Singapore and later in Batu Pahat, Senggarang, Kluang and Pagoh. He joined the Malayan Communist Party in 1937 and he was assigned to organize CPM activities in Northern Johor.

== Career ==
During the Japanese invasion of Malaya, he became the public relations secretary of the Overseas Chinese Mobilisation Council of Singapore and after the fall of Singapore, he was assigned to work on mainly publications of the CPM. After the surrender of Japan, he was sent to Kuala Lumpur to be a member of the propaganda department of the Malayan Communist Party.

In January 1946, Lee An Tong was elected as the member of the Central Committee of the Malayan Communist Party during the 8th meeting of the Central Committee and later in July, he was elected as a member of the politburo.

After the Malayan Emergency was declared, he continued to be a member of the Central Committee and in December 1960, he succeeded Yeung Kwo as Deputy Secretary General. He later became member of the International Department of the Central Committee of the CPM and was stationed in China until 1967. He came back to the Malaysian–Thai border in 1969 and lead both the Central Committee based at the Malaysian–Thai border and the North Malayan Bureau of the CPM until 1989.

After the Hatyai Peace Agreement was signed, he was resettled in the 9th Chulaporn Village (also known as Banglang Peace Village). He died in Yala on 15 July 1999.
