= Hat Yai Peace Agreement =

1989 peace ending the Malaysian communist insurgency

Agreement Between the Government of Malaysia and the Malayan Communist Party to Terminate Hostilities
- Signed: 2 December 1989
- Location: Hat Yai, Songkhla, Thailand
- Signatories: Wan Sidek Wan Abdul Rahman; General Mohd Hashim Mohd Ali; Mohammed Hanif Omar; Anek Sithipresasana; General Chavalit Yongchaiyudh; General Sawaeng Therasawat; Lieutenant General Yoodhana Yamphundu; Chin Peng; Abdullah CD; Rashid Maidin
- Parties: Malaysia; Thailand Malayan Communist Party

The Hat Yai Peace Agreement marked the end of the Communist insurgency in Malaysia (1968–1989). It was signed and ratified by the Malayan Communist Party (MCP), and the Malaysian and Thailand governments at the Lee Gardens Hotel in Hat Yai, Thailand, on 2 December 1989.

== Background ==
Losses in Peninsular Malaysia weakened the party's position and forced it to negotiate peace. The MCP realized that they no longer had a place to seek sanctuary, not even in Peninsular Malaysia. The deal was brokered by Thai authorities in collaboration with the Malaysian government.

However, during the negotiation, the MCP refused the usage of the words "surrender" and "capitulation", either by the press or the Malaysian and Thai governments. This was eventually reflected in Item 1.2 of the administrative arrangement signed separately on the same day after the peace agreement. Nevertheless, the Malaysian representatives see the peace agreement as an admission by the MCP that Malaysia has won against the communist insurgency.

The peace agreement required the MCP to disband its armed units, cease militant activity, destroy its weapons and pledge loyalty to His Majesty the Yang di Pertuan Agong of Malaysia.

After 40 years, 5 months and 26 days (since the start of the Malayan Emergency, from 16 June 1948 to 2 December 1989), the MCP insurgency officially came to an end.

== Signatories ==
The following delegates were present at the signing of the agreement in 1989:

=== Malaysian delegation ===
- Wan Sidek Wan Abdul Rahman (Ministry of Home Affairs Secretary General)
- General Mohamed Hashim Mohd Ali (Malaysian Armed Forces Chief)
- Mohammed Hanif Omar (Royal Malaysian Police, Inspector General of Police)

=== Thai delegation ===
- Anek Sithipresasana (Ministry of Interior Permanent Secretary)
- General Chavalit Yongchaiyudh (Internal Security Operations Command (ISOC) Deputy Director)
- General Sawaeng Therasawat (Royal Thai Police Director General)
- Lieutenant General Yoodhana Yamphundu (Royal Thai Army 4th Army Area Commander)

=== Malayan Communist Party delegation ===
- Chin Peng (MCP Secretary General)
- Abdullah CD (MCP Chairman)
- Rashid Maidin (MCP Central Committee Member)

== Aftermath ==
After the signing of the 1989 peace agreement, the Malayan Communist Party was dissolved. Former members of the MCP were resettled in four villages known as Kampung Aman (Peace Village). A total of 330 former MCP members were allowed to return to Malaysia.

Those MCP members who settled in South Thailand became farmers, livestock breeders, and traders. They were able to adapt to the new environment and assimilate into the local community.

Members of the Communist Party of Malaya (CPM-ML), a splinter group of the MCP, were resettled in a Friendship Village in South Thailand known as Chulaborn Village. CPM-ML members who wanted to return to Peninsular Malaysia were required to comply with several conditions set by the government of Malaysia before being able to settle in the state of their choice.
