= Malayan People's Liberation Front =

The Malayan People's Liberation Front was an organisation in Malaysia, linked to the Communist Party of Malaya - Revolutionary Faction. In 1974, MPLF mobile units killed Inspector General of Police Tan Sri Abdul Rahman Hashim. The MPLF also killed CPO Perak Khoo Chong Kong, conducted bank robberies, destroyed government installations and raided the Bernang Police Station in South Selangor and seized firearms.
