= Communist Party of Malaya/Marxist–Leninist =

- Abbreviation: CPM/ML
- Leader: Zhang Zhong Min (Ah Ling)
- Founded: August 1, 1974
- Dissolved: December 5, 1983
- Split from: Malayan Communist Party
- Succeeded by: Malaysian Communist Party
- Headquarters: West Betong district, Thailand
- Ideology: Communism; Marxism–Leninism
- Political position: Far-left
- Radio broadcast: Suara Seorang Malaysia

The Communist Party of Malaya/Marxist–Leninist was a splinter group of the Communist Party of Malaya. The CPM/ML was formed on 1 August 1974. It conducted armed struggle against the Malaysian government, with bases in southern Thailand. The CPM/ML had a radio broadcast, called Suara Seorang Malaysia (Voice of a Malaysian).

On 5 December 1983, the CPM/ML merged with the Communist Party of Malaya/Revolutionary Faction and founded the Malaysian Communist Party.
