= Communist Party of Malaya/Revolutionary Faction =

- Abbreviation: CPM-RF
- Leader: Huang Yi Chiang
- Founded: September 26, 1970
- Dissolved: December 5, 1983
- Split from: Malayan Communist Party
- Succeeded by: Malaysian Communist Party
- Headquarters: Sadao
- Ideology: Communism; Marxism–Leninism
- Political position: Far-left
- Colours: Red

The Communist Party of Malaya/Revolutionary Faction was a splinter group of the Communist Party of Malaya. The CPM/RF was engaged in armed struggle. It was founded on 26 September 1970, when the 8th regiment at Sadao Camp broke off from the Communist Party of Malaya, under leadership of Huang Yijiang. In 1983, merged with the Communist Party of Malaya/Marxist–Leninist to form the Malaysian Communist Party in 1983.

== See also ==
- Malayan People's Liberation Front
