= Chang Ling-Yun =

Malaysian politician (1921–1989)

Chang Ling-Yun (Chinese: 章凌云; 9 March 1921 – 31 May 1989) was a prominent member of the Malayan Communist Party. He led the North Malayan Bureau of the Malayan Communist Party from 1964 to 1989.
