= Anti-Japanese resistance movement in Malaya during World War II =

There were several anti-Japanese groups in British Malaya during the Japanese Occupation. During this period, multiple groups emerged in response to the purported mistreatment of locals by the Japanese, which resulted in widespread discontent throughout the region. These were called anti-Japanese groups, serving as the origin of numerous anti-Japanese movements that reflected the prevailing local resentment of the time.

== Malayan People's Anti-Japanese Army ==
The Malayan People's Anti-Japanese Army (MPAJA) was a paramilitary group that was active during the Japanese occupation of Malaya from 1942 to 1945. Composed mainly of ethnic Chinese guerrilla fighters, the MPAJA was the biggest anti-Japanese resistance group in Malaya. Founded on 18 December, 1941 during the Japanese invasion of Malaya, the MPAJA was conceived as a part of a combined effort by the Malayan Communist Party (MCP), British colonial government, and various anti-Japanese groups to resist the Japanese occupation of Malayan territory. Although the MPAJA and the MCP were officially different organizations, many saw the MPAJA as the de facto armed wing of the MCP due to its leadership being staffed by mostly ethnic Chinese communists. Many of the ex-guerrillas of the MPAJA would later join the MCP in its open conflict with the BMA during the Malayan Emergency.

=== Resistance movement ===
Because the MPAJA was the only local resistance to the Japanese during the war, Great Britain supplied it with officers and other resources. Upon British advice, the MPAJA avoided large-scale action against the Japanese. But after the war, its Communist-indoctrinated members emerged as heroes. This army attempted a brief, unsuccessful seizure of political power before the British military returned.

=== Strategies used to rebel against the Japanese ===
The MPAJA cooperated with the British to combat the Japanese occupation. The communists and the British, who were previously adversaries, joined forces to confront their shared enemy, the Japanese. They waged a guerrilla war against the Japanese Army in Malaya. On 1 January 1944, MPAJA leaders arrived at the Force 136 camp and entered into discussions with the Force 136 officers. "It was agreed that in return for arms, money, training, and supplies, the MPAJA would cooperate and accept the British Army's orders during the war with Japan..." The members from the MPAJA were provided training by the British to fight against the Japanese. After February 1945, more Force 136 groups were parachuted into Malaya to prepare for the Allied forces invasion of Malaya.

However, Force 136 was unable to keep several pre-planned rendezvous with its submarines, and had lost its wireless sets. As a result, the Allied command did not hear the agreement until 1 February 1945, and it was only during the last months of the war that the British were able to supply the MPAJA by air.

=== Support from the masses ===
In order to move towards independence after the Japanese were defeated, the MPAJA had to meet several conditions. The most important of which was to gain support from three primary ethnic groups - the Chinese, Malays and Indians. However, due to the different historical backgrounds of the three ethnic groups and due to the misunderstanding and bias view of each ethnic group (see below), this could not be achieved. They lacked any cohesive national view and, therefore, had little mass support from their own people.

==== In the case of the Chinese ====
A majority of them still identified with China rather than with Malaya at that time. The Japanese war in China had aroused strong anti-Japan sentiments and strengthened pro-China feelings among the Malayan Chinese. They resented the Japanese for their harsh treatment and the preferential treatment the Malays had received prior to the war.

==== In the case of the Malays ====
As for the Malays, except for a few who were close to the Chinese, most took no more than sympathetic or neutral stands toward the MPAJA. This means that the MPAJA would not have the majority support of the Malays. They were also treated less harshly by the Japanese compared to the Chinese. As civilian and POW deaths grew to tens of thousands, what sympathies they initially had for Japan evaporated. Most Malaysians would come to regard the occupation as "cruel" and "brutal".

==== In the case of the Indians ====
Their "temporary stay" thinking was even stronger than that of the Chinese, believing that one day they will return to their Homeland. They abhorred the British colonial authorities and longed for Indian independence. Neither the MCP nor the MPAJA really understood the situation of the Indians, therefore the Indians did not support MPAJA.

=== Success ===
The MPAJA claimed that they eliminated 5,500 Japanese troops while losing 1,000 themselves. The Japanese claimed that their losses (killed and wounded) were 600 of their own troops and 2000 local police, and that the MPAJA losses were 2,900. Mr.Cheah Boon Kheng thought that the Japanese's report was probably more reliable. The MPAJA engaged in reprisals against members of the local population who collaborated with the Japanese. Because of Japanese policy, these tended to be ethnic Malays, many of whom the Japanese employed as policemen. Although the MCP and MPAJA consistently espoused non-racial policies, the fact that their members came predominantly from the Chinese community the reprisals made against Malays, who had collaborated, became a source of racial tension. They have been criticized for this and also for occasionally wasting time attacking the Kuomintang instead of the Japanese.

As there was a lack of mass support from their own people, they had fewer people to carry out the actions together. This led to defeat easily as there was no one to fight for the organizations and carry out anti-Japanese resistance movement. From these two situations, we can see that the movements were unsuccessful. The MPAJA was unable to remove Japanese troops from the region.
