= Chin Peng =

Malayan communist leader (1924–2013)

Chin Peng ~~OBE~~ (Note: Awarded and subsequently withdrawn by the British government.)
- 陳平
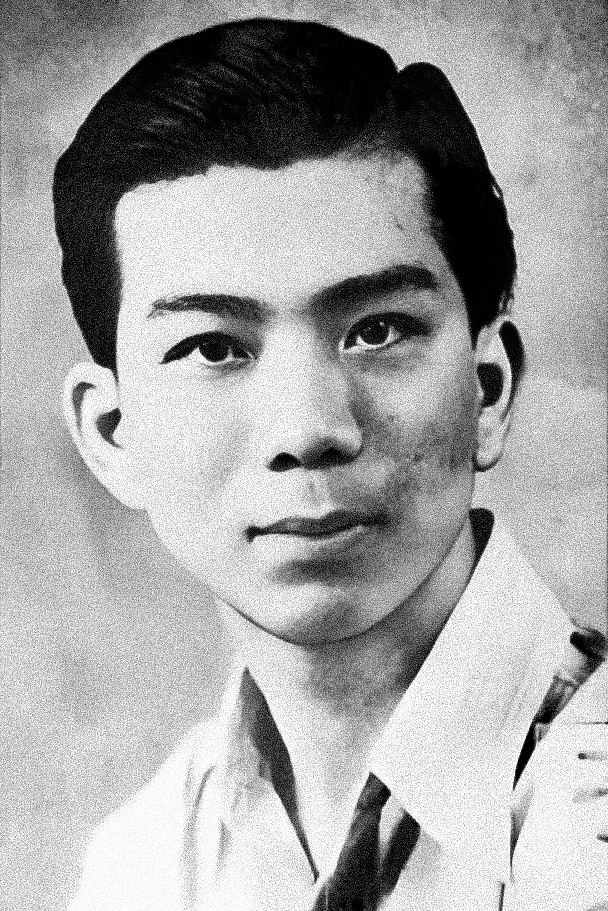
- Portrait, c. late 1940s

General Secretary of the Communist Party of Malaya
- In office 6 March 1947 – 2 December 1989
- Preceded by: Lai Teck
- Succeeded by: Position abolished

Personal details
- Born: Ong Boon Hua; 21 October 1924 36 Kampung Koh, Sitiawan, Dindings, Straits Settlements
- Died: 16 September 2013 (aged 88) Bumrungrad International Hospital, Bangkok, Thailand
- Resting place: Chemor, Perak, Malaysia
- Party: Communist Party of Malaya
- Spouse: Lee Khoon Wah (m. 1945; died 2008)
- Children: 2
- Parents: Ong Sing Piaw (father); Kuan Kheng Bee (mother)

Chin Peng (Note: simplified Chinese: 陈平; traditional Chinese: 陳平; pinyin: Chén Píng; Jyutping: Can4 Ping4; Pe̍h-ōe-jī: Tân Pêng;) (21 October 1924 – 16 September 2013), born Ong Boon Hua, (Note: simplified Chinese: 王文华; traditional Chinese: 王文華; pinyin: Wáng Wénhuá; Jyutping: Wong4 Man4 Waa6; Pe̍h-ōe-jī: Ông Bûn-hôa) was a Malayan communist politician, guerrilla leader, and revolutionary. He was the longest-serving General Secretary of the Communist Party of Malaya (CPM) and the leader of its armed wing, the Malayan National Liberation Army (MNLA). A Maoist, he led the CPM from 1947 until the party's dissolution in 1989.

Chin was born into a middle-class family in Sitiawan, now a part of Perak. In 1939, at the age of 15, he became a revolutionary and fled to Kuala Lumpur in 1940. He joined the CPM in 1941, and quickly involved himself in local party committees and labour unions in Perak. Throughout the Second World War, Chin fought as an anti-colonialist guerrilla in the Malayan Peoples' Anti-Japanese Army (MPAJA) against the Japanese occupation of Malaya, allying with Force 136, a British-funded covert resistance movement. He was subsequently awarded the Order of the British Empire (OBE).

As the most senior surviving member of the CPM to emerge from the war, he founded the MNLA and between 1948 and 1960 engaged in an unsuccessful war—known as the Malayan Emergency—to win independence for Malaya from the British Empire. His actions led to the revocation of his OBE by Britain. After Britain agreed to grant Malaya independence and the CPM decided to demobilise, Chin went into exile in China, then Thailand, and waged a second guerrilla campaign between 1968 and 1989 against the now-independent Malaysian government. This campaign also did not succeed, and ended with a final peace agreement in 1989, which dissolved the CPM permanently. He was not permitted to return to Malaysia, and Chin died in exile in Bangkok, Thailand, in 2013 at the age of 88.

Chin Peng remains a controversial figure in Malaysia. His detractors condemn him and the MNLA for committing numerous atrocities during the Emergency, characterising him as an ideological fanatic and terrorist. Others credit him for contributing to the Malayan independence process and view him as a prominent anti-imperialist rebel leader against British colonialism. At the time of his death, he was the last surviving postwar revolutionary leader to have successfully fought for independence from colonialism in Asia.

== Early life ==
=== Youth years ===
Chin Peng was born Ong Boon Hua on 21 October 1924 into a middle-class family in the small seaside town of Sitiawan, Dindings, which at the time was a part of the Straits Settlements. His ancestral home was in Fuqing, Fujian, China. His father went to live in Sitiawan in 1920, and set up a bicycle, tire, and spare motor parts business with the help of a relative from Singapore, known as Ong Lock Cho.

Chin Peng attended a Chinese language school in Sitiawan. In 1937 he joined the Chinese Anti Enemy Backing Up Society (AEBUS), formed that year to send aid to China in response to Japan's aggression. According to Chin and Hack, he was not a communist then. He was in charge of anti-Japanese activities at his school, and was reportedly a supporter of Sun Yat-sen.

=== First participation in communism ===
By early 1939, Chin had embraced communism. He planned to go to Yan'an, the renowned communist base in China but was persuaded to remain in Malaya and take on heavier responsibilities in the newly formed Malayan Communist Party.

In late 1939, when Chin Peng was in the 4th year of his secondary school education (known as senior middle-level one), his school announced that the senior middle section was to be closed due to lack of funds. He decided to continue his education in the Methodist-run Anglo-Chinese Continuation School, which operated in English, because it provided a good cover for his underground activities. He did not want to have to move to Singapore to continue with his education in Chinese. He left the school "for fear of British harassment" after just 6 months. He was now focused fully on his political activities and became, from that point on, a full-time revolutionary. In January 1940 he was put in charge of three anti-Japanese organisations that were targeting students, teachers, members of cultural activities, and general labourers. At the end of January 1940, he was admitted to the Malayan Communist Party as a member.

== Early revolutionary activity ==
Harassment by the authorities led him to leave his home town for Kuala Kangsar in July 1940. Later he spent a month in Taiping. In September 1940 the party posted him to Ipoh as a standing committee member for Perak. In December he attained full party membership.

In early 1941 AEBUS was dissolved. Chin Peng became Ipoh District committee member of the party. "He led student underground cells of three Chinese secondary schools and the Party's organisations of the shop assistants, domestic servants of European families, workers at brick kilns and barbers."

In June 1941 he became a member of the Perak State Committee.

=== Second World War ===
Chin Peng rose to prominence during World War II when many Chinese Malayans took to the jungle to fight a guerrilla war against the Japanese. These fighters, inspired by the example of the Chinese Communist Party (CCP), became known as the Malayan Peoples' Anti-Japanese Army (MPAJA). Chin Peng became the liaison officer between the MPAJA and the British military in Southeast Asia.

The Japanese invasion of Malaya began in December 1941. In 1942 Chin was the youngest of three members of the Secretariat of the Perak State Committee: Su Yew Meng was secretary and Chang Meng Ching was the other member. In early 1943 the two senior members were captured by the Japanese, which left Chin Peng in charge. Contact with the Party's Central Committee had been lost; he attempted to re-establish it, travelling to Kuala Lumpur and meeting Chai Ker Meng. Later, party leader Lai Tek sent another Central Committee member, Lee Siow Peng (Siao Ping), to replace Chin as State Secretary. However, Lee Siow Peng was captured not long after while travelling to a meeting that was to be held in Singapore.

Thus the job of establishing contact with the British commando Force 136 fell to Chin Peng. The first party of that force, consisting of Captain John Davis and five Chinese agents had landed in Malaya on 24 May 1943, by submarine. Chin Peng made contact with the group on 30 September 1943. He was active in his support for the British stay-behind troops but had no illusions about their failure to protect Malaya against the Japanese. In the course of this activity, he came into contact with Freddie Spencer Chapman, who called him a 'true friend' in his Malayan jungle memoir, The Jungle Is Neutral.

In recognition of his service during the war, Chin was awarded an Order of the British Empire (OBE) (though it was later withdrawn by the British government), a mention in despatches and two campaign medals by Britain. He was elected the Secretary-General of the Communist Party of Malaya after the previous leader Lai Tek, had turned out to be an agent for both the British and the Japanese and had denounced the leadership of the party to the Japanese secret police. Chin Peng was the most senior surviving member.

=== Before the Emergency ===
In 1948, the Federation of Malaya plan replaced the Malayan Union plan, frustrating the CPM as they felt the plan was undemocratic and biased towards the Malay elites. They accused the British of forcing idea of federation on people by portraying it as a constitutional solution to Malaya's crisis. According to Chin, the central committee still adhered to Lai Teck's peace struggle strategy in facing the federation, as they thought that the people of Malaya were still recovering from the horrors of the Japanese occupation. To launch an armed rebellion so soon would not only cause them to lose support of the masses but would also drive the already wary Malays to openly resist them.

Some scholars allege that the CPM received secret directives from Moscow agents on the methods and timing for a near-simultaneous uprising against colonial authorities during the Southeast Asian Youth Conference held in Calcutta on 19 February 1948 which eventually caused the CPM's insurrection. Chin denied it, stating that the conference argued against such a move. Lance Sharkey, party secretary of the Australian Communist Party, informed Chin and the central committee of the conference's decision while stopping over in Singapore on his way home. In March 1948, the central committees were discussing new policies as the labour strikes were not bringing the results that they hoped for. Chin Peng estimated it would be a year or two before the British took actions against the CPM, leaving them ample time to prepare for a guerrilla war.

On 12 June 1948, the colonial government outlawed the burgeoning trade union federations amid rising tensions. Since then, there was no reduction in the level of violent activities, other than the neutralisation of trade unions. Political murders of informers, anyone found to be working against the labour movement or the CPM, non-Europeans considered enemies to the communist cause or strike-breakers who used thugs and gangsters to harass protesters rose. The murder of three Kuomintang leaders in Johor on 12 June had convinced the British that the communists were escalating the conflict in retaliation for outlawing the trade unions, while in the CPM's eyes these murders were just purely acts of intimidation. Chin again claimed that he was not aware of the murders at the time, although he approved of the later killing of the plantation managers who he claimed were harsh and cruel towards farmworkers.

== Leadership of the Malayan Communist Party ==
=== The Emergency (1948–1989) ===
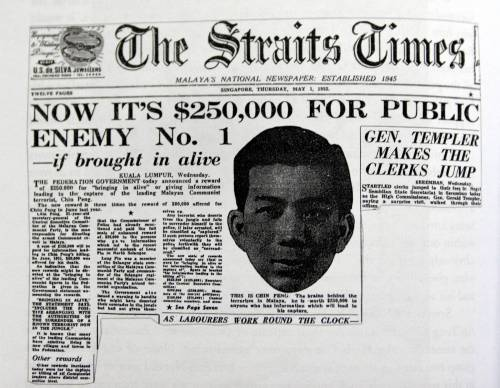
Headline on page 1 of The Straits Times of 1952

On 16 June 1948, three European plantation managers were murdered in Sungai Siput, which has generally been identified as the incident which caused the Malayan colonial administration to declare a state of emergency. Rather, Sze-Chieh Ng argued these murders were merely the final catalyst for a long-brewing crisis that had been going on since the trade unions began agitating in 1945. Historian Anthony Short feels that this was more of a panic reaction than a carefully considered move. According to him, the government had been powerless to deal with the unrest plaguing Malaya since 1945. According to Purcell's viewpoint, the Emergency was declared in response to increasing incidents of violence and lawlessness.

Many Singaporean historians and anti-communists allege that Chin Peng ordered the killings. Chin claimed he had no prior knowledge of the plot. He added that he barely escaped arrest, losing his passport in the process, and he lost touch with the party for a couple of days. Chin became the most wanted man of the British government, with the government offering a reward of $250,000 for his capture. On 17 July 1948, CPM offices in Kuala Lumpur, Ipoh, Singapore, and other major cities were raided, followed by mass arrests of suspected communists and anti-government individuals on 21 July. The CPM was banned in July 1948.

In response to the Emergency and the mass arrests of its members, the CPM issued a call to its members to revive its disbanded wartime resistance army, the MPAJA, to take up arms again and escape to the jungles. Since late May and early June the communists had been secretly setting up platoons in several states in preparation for an expected British crackdown in September. The sudden declaration of the Emergency in June, however, forced the MCP to hasten its plan, and they appealed to comrades and volunteers to join them in the struggle. The new guerrilla army, now known as the Malayan National Liberation Army (MNLA), spent the first year of the Emergency reconsolidating and rearming.

At that time, the CPM was in chaos. Its members were dispersed in the jungle and operated without any command structure or central leadership. According to Chin, attacks were being carried out without his approval or knowledge and there was no coordination among units. The guerrillas endured heavy casualties and made few or no strategic gains in the early months. Chin was desperate to assert control over the MNLA, which had been operating independently since June. It was not until August that some form of central authority was finally set up in the Cameron Highlands, with Chin ordering the guerrillas to adopt Mao Zedong's strategy of establishing liberated zones whenever they drove British forces from an area. However, this strategy failed. British forces continued to hound the guerrillas, who were often forced to retreat deeper into the jungles and disperse into smaller units due to difficulties in resupplying and the risk of larger units being detected and annihilated by British patrols.

Furthermore, the CPM was losing civilian support, and lacking material assistance and intelligence, the party suffered. Chin admitted they had wrongly assumed that the people would be willing support his men, as they had done during World War II. When that failed to happen, they resorted to force to satisfy their needs.

The CPM and MNLA also suffered under British propaganda, which labelled them "bandits" and "communist terrorists". Old suspicions and assumptions that the CPM had clandestine support from either the CCP or the Soviet Union had, over time, hardened into certainty. Records disclosed after the Cold War ended disproved the claim, revealing that the CPM had not sought external support and that no agents from either China or the Soviet Union had even made contact with them. The only 'support' Chin recalled obtaining was the encouraging news that Mao's guerrillas had defeated Chiang Kai-shek's well-equipped and numerically superior KMT army in 1949.

==== Briggs Plan ====
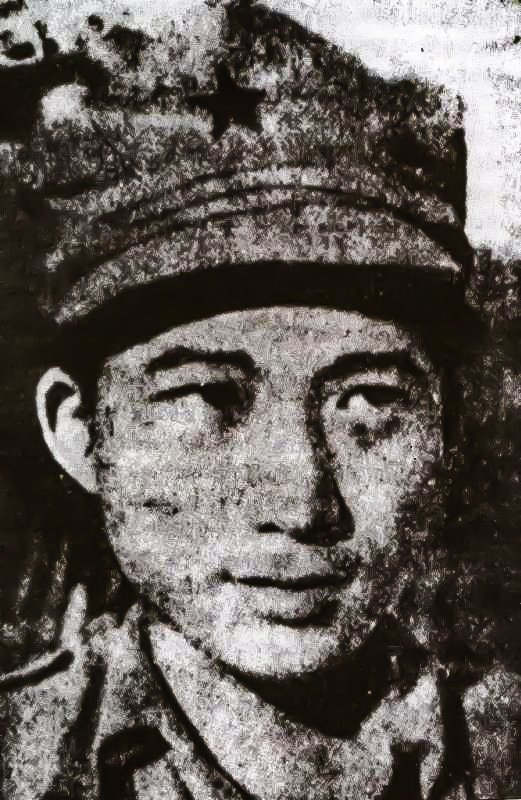
Chin in party uniform.

In 1950, a series of strategies were introduced by the Director of Operations for the anti-communist war in Malaya, Lieutenant General Sir Harold Briggs, that later became known as the Briggs Plan. The plan, which aimed to defeat the guerrillas by cutting off their sources of civilian support, was a success. The creation of 'new villages' under this plan restricted intelligence and food supplies for the CPM, and thus had a devastating effect on the guerrillas. Chin was aware of this as he nearly starved several times during those twelve years.

After several reviews and amendments, the CPM ordered the guerrillas to cease sabotage and terror operations and to develop closer ties with the middle-class to preserve their organizational strength. Chin would later admit in an interview in 1999 that this directive was a mistake as it allowed the British to press on with their attacks on the MNLA, whom they correctly assessed to be quite demoralised by then.

After Sir Harold Briggs died, Lieutenant General Sir Gerald Templer was appointed as the new commander, introducing aggressive strategies which differed from the Briggs Plan. These included interrogations, food rationing, large monetary rewards for captured or killed communists coupled with intense military operations, and the mobilisation of a large number of troops to hound the guerrillas. In 1953, the CPM relocated their headquarters to Betong, in southern Thailand. They reestablished its networks to connect the scattered units and review its strategy.

In late 1953 and early 1954, the war was at a semi-stalemate due to both the MNLA and the British being unable to decisively defeat one another. In early 1954, Siao Chang, a top CPM leader who had been sent to Beijing in late 1952 to deepen his Marxist–Leninist education while also serving as liaison to the CCP, announced a new direction for the party, which was to abandon the establishment of the People's Democratic Republic of Malaya and join with other Malayan political parties in a legal fight for Malayan independence. Chin described Siao as the CPM's 'insurance policy' in the event the central committee was eliminated.

Although this was not their decision, Chin and the other central committees decided to join the other Malayan parties, reasoning that the Malay politicians had achieved more for the independence movement within the last few years than the MNLA had since 1948. The Beijing announcement also revealed to the CPM that both the Soviet Union and the People's Republic of China had viewed the armed struggle in Malaya as untenable.

=== Baling talks, 1955 ===
On 24 September 1955, Chin wrote to Tunku Abdul Rahman offering to negotiate peace. On 17 October, talks between two government representatives and Chin Peng and another central committee of the CPM were held at Klian Intan. A new 'Eight Point Program' was introduced by the CPM which called for an end to the Emergency and a cessation of hostilities, a reformation of Malaya's political system, expanding democratic rights, support for world peace, and attention to other matters including education, health, welfare, and industrial production.

On 28 and 29 December 1955, the negotiations reached their peak at the small northern town of Baling in Kedah. Representatives from the Government were Tunku Abdul Rahman, David Marshall, the Chief Minister of Singapore, and Sir Tan Cheng Lock, the leader of the Malayan Chinese Association (MCA). The CPM was represented by Chin Peng, Chen Tian, and Abdul Rashid bin Maidin. The first day of the talks did not go well, as Chin wanted the CPM to be recognised as a legal party again, or for the leaders and members of the MNLA to at least be allowed to regain their freedom of movement and not face any legal persecution or imprisonment. Tunku Abdul Rahman rejected this request and demanded that the CPM fully surrender as the only way to peace, but promised that those who surrendered would undergo a period of rehabilitation before being allowed to become free citizens again.

Chin again argued freedom of thought and choice must be recognised by the Malayan government if the new nation was to survive past its independence, as the people should have the right to decide which political path the nation should take rather than having that choice be decided by a select few in the government. Tunku Abdul Rahman rejected this as well and only promised freedom for the CPM members to join any existing political party after being cleared by the authorities.

On the second day of the talks, Chin promised that the CPM would stop fighting and lay down its arms if the Alliance government persuaded the British government to grant it authority over internal security and defence. Tunku Abdul Rahman accepted it as a challenge and promised that he would push for it on his upcoming trip to London. Great publicity was given in the media to this dramatic challenge from Chin Peng. The challenge, indeed, served to strengthen the Alliance government's bargaining position at the London talks. Anxious to end the Emergency, the British government agreed to concede those powers of internal security and defence and to accede to the demand for independence for Malaya by 31 August 1957, if possible. Chin claimed it was his challenge to Tunku Abdul Rahman that hastened the independence of Malaya. Tunku Abdul Rahman had acknowledged the importance of the Baling talks, writing in 1974 that "Baling had led straight to Merdeka (Independence)."

Regardless, the talks themselves ended without a consensus between the two sides. Though the talks collapsed they were regarded as both a success and failure for Tunku Abdul Rahman, as the talks made the British regard him as a strong leader who was tough on communism. His performance also impressed the Colonial Office enough to grant Malaya independence. For the CPM, it was a very demoralising affair that nearly destroyed their already ailing struggle. The failure of the Baling Talks was a great blow for the CPM, since they now lost hope both of ending the war and of propagating their ideology. Due to the mounting combat casualties and the insecurity of food supplies, the members began surrendering to the government in exchange for monetary rewards and pardons.

In 1956, Chin wrote to Tunku Abdul Rahman offering to resume negotiations. This was rejected by Tunku Abdul Rahman in a broadcast on 2 April. By late 1958, the MNLA had lost almost 88% of its men, declining from an approximately 3,000-strong army when they first rebelled in mid-1948 to no more than 350 men, as a result of casualties and surrenders.

In 1959, the central committees of CPM decided to demobilise their activities and to have the guerrillas reintegrate into society while continuing to promote their communist ideals until such a time when they could once again rise up in revolt. Chin then moved to south Thailand with the remnants of his forces during the latter part of the Emergency due to pressure from the Malayan security forces, which by 1952 totalled over 32,000 regular troops in Malaya, about three-fifths of whom were Europeans from the United Kingdom, New Zealand and Australia.

=== The second insurgency (1968–1989) ===
In 1961, members of the CPM central committee such as Chin Peng, Chen Tien, and Lee An Tung moved to Beijing to seek political advice and guidance from the more experienced Chinese Communist Party. Chin would, however, remain in Beijing for the next 29 years and the party would not lay down its arms until 1989. The reasons for this reversal of the party's decision to disband, according to Chin, was the advice given to him by the Vietnamese communist leaders in Hanoi, the opening of the second 'Vietnam War', which was followed by China's Cultural Revolution, all of which stressed a strong militant line to be taken by Asian communist parties.

While in Beijing, Chin Peng was also advised by Deng Xiaoping, to continue the armed struggle in Malaya as Deng felt the time was ripe for revolutions to take place in Southeast Asia. Deng insisted that the military struggle should not only be maintained but stepped up. Deng even promised financial support to the CPM if they should take up arms once again. Deng offered for this to remain a secret as the CCP did not wish to let it be known that they had been actively supporting Southeast Asia's communist movements. Chin reluctantly accepted Deng's suggestion. This was also the first time that the CPM had accepted foreign assistance in its struggle and it was with this financial backing that the second armed struggle in Malaya would be launched in 1968.

Meanwhile, back in Malaya, the Malayan government had declared the Emergency over on 31 July 1960 once they became confident the MNLA had ceased to be a credible threat, with the surviving guerrillas retreating to their sanctuary in southern Thailand. However, the insurgency continued with the insurgents increasing their attacks, ambushing military convoys, bombing national monuments, and assassinations of marked police officers and political 'enemy targets'. The insurgency, which began as a war against the British colonialists, was now transformed into a war against 'federalists, compressors capitalists and lackeys of British imperialism'. The Malayan government maintained a high-security alert by devoting one-third of its national budget to defence and internal security needs and requested British, Australian and New Zealand troops to remain in the country until its internal security and national armed forces could be built up and the foreign troops gradually phased out.

In 1970, the CPM's guerrilla bases in Thailand were hard hit by the trials and executions of suspected spies. Two breakaway factions were formed which condemned the purge. Chin, who was then based in China, denied involvement and later rehabilitated his accused comrades. During the 1970s and 1980s, the CPM intensified its activities and clashes with the security forces. These activities were due to a rivalry among three factions in the CPM over party purges and strategies, with each faction trying to outdo the other in militancy and violence.

However, in 1980, Deng Xiaoping refocused his priorities back on the Chinese bureaucracy after his return to power in 1978. He welcomed Prime Minister of Singapore Lee Kuan Yew and its leading political figure since independence from Malaysia, in a visit to Beijing. Chin recalled that Deng had not bothered to meet him since then. Finally, in December 1980, Deng summoned Chin. In the meeting, Deng demanded Chin to immediately close down all the CPM's radio stations which were broadcasting from China to Malaysia. When Chin asked Deng when he would like him to cease the broadcasting, Deng replied, "The sooner the better ... Lee (Lee Kuan Yew) asked me to stop the broadcasts immediately." Moreover, during his official visit to China, the second prime minister of Malaysia Abdul Razak Hussein held talks with Chinese communist leader Chairman Mao Zedong and urged him to stop giving aid to the CPM. The fourth prime minister Mahathir Mohamad further succeeded in persuading China to downgrade its ties with the CPM. This was an important factor that contributed to the CPM's decision to end its armed struggle.

=== Peace process, 1989 ===
The CPM finally laid down its arms in 1989. The death toll during the armed conflict totalled thousands. Those sympathetic to Chin Peng tend to portray the violence perpetrated by the CPM as defensive, while right-wing opponents tend to portray it as aggressive and unethical. Some have claimed a large number of civilian casualties was in contrast to the stance adopted by Mao Zedong and his policy of the Eight Points of Attention.

On 2 December 1989, at the town of Hat Yai in Southern Thailand, Chin, Rashid Maidin, and Abdullah CD met with representatives of the Malaysian and Thai governments. Separate peace agreements were signed between the MCP and both governments. One of the terms of the agreement was that MCP members of Malayan origin be allowed to return to live in Malaysia.

When all hostilities ceased, the total number of CPM members was 1,188; 694 were Thai-born and 494 claimed origins in Peninsular Malaysia. They were given a temporary grant and promised integration into Malaysia.

In Chin's opinion, peace could have been achieved as early as 1955 during the Baling Talks, if the British, Tunku Abdul Rahman and David Marshall had not demanded that the communist fighters capitulate and surrender but, rather, had allowed them to hand over or destroy their weapons in a mutually agreed way and then resume normal life with full political freedom, which was the broad outcome of the 1989 accords.

== Final years ==
=== Application to return to Malaysia ===
Chin was not permitted to return to Malaysia after the 1989 Hat Yai Peace Accords and continued his exile in Thailand. He did visit neighbouring Singapore, where he gave lectures at the National University of Singapore (NUS) in 2004, using purposes of academic research as his reason to gain visitation permission from the Singaporean government. At the beginning of 2000, he applied for permission to return to Malaysia. His application was rejected by the high court on 25 July 2005.

In June 2008, Chin again lost his bid to return to Malaysia when the Court of Appeal upheld an earlier ruling that compelled him to show identification papers to prove his citizenship. Chin maintained that his birth certificate was seized by the police during a raid in 1948. His counsel Raja Aziz Addruse had submitted before the Court of Appeal that it was wrong for the Malaysian government to compel him to produce the documents because he was entitled to enter and live in Malaysia under the peace agreement.

In April 2009, Chin's application to return to Malaysia was once again rejected by the High Court for the same reason as his previous attempt. The Malaysian government insisted that his possible return would cause people who lost their loved ones during the Emergency to relive their pain again.

In November 2009, Chin issued an apology to the victims and their family members for the atrocities committed by the CPM. However, the Deputy Prime Minister of Malaysia, Muhyiddin Yassin, replied that despite Chin's apology, he would still not be allowed to return to Malaysia due to his treason. Former Inspector-General of Police Norian Mai said that Chin Peng had left it too late.

=== Death ===
Chin died of cancer at the age of 88 at a private hospital in Bangkok, with only his 50-year-old niece by his side, on the morning of 16 September 2013, the 50th anniversary of the establishment of Malaysia.

While Chin had previously voiced his desire to be buried in Sitiawan, his remains continued to be denied entry for burial in Malaysia by the Malaysian government, as it was claimed that the one-year window after the agreement to reapply for citizenship had long lapsed and Chin was assumed to have relinquished his rights to return. In November 2019, his remains were announced to have been returned in secrecy by a small action committee on 16 September 2019; his ashes were ceremoniously transported through Sitiawan before scattering at a hillside near Chemor and at sea.

== Publications ==
Chin Peng co-authored his story with Singapore-based writers and publishers Ian Ward, who was formerly the Southeast Asia correspondent for the London conservative newspaper, The Daily Telegraph, and Ward's wife Norma Miraflor. The book named Alias Chin Peng: My Side of History, was published in 2003.

Another book, Dialogues with Chin Peng: New Light on the Malayan Communist Party by editors C. C. Chin and Karl Hack, was published by the Singapore University Press in 2004. This book details a series of meetings held in Australia that Chin Peng had attended with historians and military experts.

== Media portrayal ==
In 2006, a documentary film about Chin Peng was made called The Last Communist. It was banned by the Ministry of Home Affairs of Malaysia.

Another documentary film about Chin Peng called I Love Malaya was released 25 November 2006.

== Chronology ==
- 21 October 1924: Birth.
- January 1940: Accepted as probationary member of the Communist Party of Malaya (CPM); put in charge of Communist members in Sitiawan.
- 4 July 1940: Leaves home.
- December 1941: Communists' offer of help accepted; joins the fight against the Japanese.
- 10 January 1942: The first batch of the Malayan Peoples Anti-Japanese Army (MPAJA).
- 1942: Meets future wife, Lee Khoon Wah.
- 1945: World War II ends.
- January 1946: Awarded 2 war medals; boycotts tour of British bases; forced to sign letter of apology.
- Mid-October 1946: In Penang, Yeung Kuo reveals that Lai Teck has betrayed the CPM; Lai Teck subsequently absconds with most of party's money.
- 6 March 1947: CPM Central Executive Committee meeting held to deal with Lai Teck controversy; Lai Teck fails to appear and is never seen by MCP again. Later, Chin Peng is elected secretary-general of MCP.
- 1948: Three planters killed at Sungei Siput; Emergency declared; CPM was declared illegal.
- Late 1950: Harold Briggs arrives in Malaya and implements the Briggs plan – resettling people into "New Villages". If the people refused to move, the British would forcibly remove them and sometimes burn down their houses. This made it difficult for the Communists to gain food supplies from the "Min Yuen", their supporters in the villages.
- 6 October 1951: Sir Henry Gurney, British High Commissioner in Malaya, is assassinated on Gap road to Fraser's Hill by Siew Ma. It was a "chance" ambush by Siew Ma and his party and not a plan to assassinate Gurney.
- 7 February 1952: Sir Gerald Templer, arrives to take the place of Gurney, and implements harsh measures against the Communists.
- 28–29 December 1955: The Baling Talks was held with Chin Peng representing the Malayan Communist Party, Tunku Abdul Rahman representing the government of the Federation of Malaya and David Marshall representing the government of the Crown Colony of Singapore. The talks were unsuccessful due to surrender terms, which were unacceptable for the Malayan Communist Party.
- 1960: The Emergency is officially declared over and Chin Peng went to China. However, fighting still continues. Ah Cheng @ Shan Ruhong replaces him as acting Secretary-General in Malaya. Special Malaysian government troops going by the name "Senoi Praaq" prove to be a thorn in Chin Peng's side.
- 2 December 1989: The Peace Agreement of Hat Yai was signed between the Malayan Communist Party and the governments of Malaysia and Thailand. The long, hard war the British had preferred to term an Emergency was over.
- 6–8 October 2004: Chin Peng visits Singapore for 3 days to speak at the Institute of South-east Asian Studies (ISEAS).
- 2005: Chin Peng is pending to return to Malaysia. His hearing was scheduled for 25 May 2005, and the High Court postponed it to 25 July 2005. This application was subsequently rejected.
- June 2008: Chin Peng's lost his bid to return to Malaysia when the Court of Appeal demanded he showed identification papers to prove his Malayan citizenship.
- 16 September 2013: Chin Peng died at Bumrungrad International Hospital in Bangkok. He was 88. According to the Bangkok Post, he was pronounced dead at 6.20am (GMT+8).
