= Lai Teck =

Leader of the Communist Party of Malaya (1939–1947)

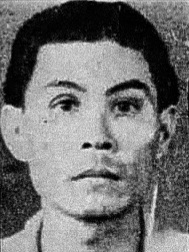
- Portrait, c. late-1930s.

Secretary-General of Communist Party of Malaya
- In office April 1939 – 6 March 1947
- Preceded by: Yang Shaomin
- Succeeded by: Chin Peng

Personal details
- Born: Hoang A Nhac or Phạm Văn Đắc; 1901 Nghệ Tĩnh Province, Annam (According to Vietnamese historians: Bà Rịa, French Cochinchina)
- Died: 1947 Bangkok, Thailand
- Cause of death: Suffocation
- Resting place: Menam River
- Party: Communist Party of Malaya
- Other political affiliations: Malayan People's Anti-Japanese Army
- Occupation: Politician, spy
- Other names: Lai Tek, Loi Tak, Lee Soong, Wong Kim Geok, Chang Hung, Mr. Wright

Lai Teck (real name Phạm Văn Đắc or Hoang A Nhac; 1901–1947) was a leader of the Communist Party of Malaya and Malayan People's Anti-Japanese Army. A person of mixed Sino-Vietnamese descent, prior to his arrival in Malaya, Lai Teck was believed to have led his life as Truong Phuoc Dat until 1934, during which Dat disappeared and Lai Teck appeared.

== Biography ==
Lai Teck was born under the name of Hoang A Nhac or Phạm Văn Đắc in the Bà Rịa (now Bà Rịa–Vũng Tàu province) in 1901. According to his successor Chin Peng, he curiously chose the party alias 'Wright' which was rendered into Chinese as 萊特 (pinyin: Láitè), the name's standard transcription. This name was often "retranslated" into English in various ways based on the various pronunciations of the characters in different Chinese languages. Thus, it was often written as 'Lai Teck' (from Hokkien; Pe̍h-ōe-jī: Lâi-te̍k) and 'Loi Teck' (from Cantonese; Jyutping: Loi^{4} Dak^{6}), or even reinterpreted as 'Lighter'.

Lai Teck was believed to have served the French as a spy in Indochina but been uncovered. It was subsequently alleged that he was recruited by the British security services and brought to Singapore in 1934 to infiltrate the Communist Party of Malaya.

At this he was highly successful, and by using the colonial police force to pick off his rivals within the party he rose through the hierarchy and became the leader of the party as its secretary general in April 1939. Perhaps because of this, he steered the party on a course of non-confrontation with the British and wholly embraced the Communist International's new line of co-operation with the United States and the Western European powers against Nazi Germany and Japan.

Although many of the CPM's top personnel managed to flee Singapore before its capture by Japanese forces, Lai Teck did not and was picked up in a Japanese sweep shortly after in early March 1942. Although most communists were executed by the Japanese, Lai Teck walked free a few days later. Based on later evidence, including documents in Japanese archives, it now appears likely that Lai Teck saved his life by promising to act as a Japanese agent.

In August 1942 Lai Teck arranged for a full meeting which included the CPM's Central Executive Committee, state party officials, and a group leaders of the MPAJA to be held at the Batu Caves, about ten miles north from Kuala Lumpur. On 1 September 1942, more than 100 senior CPM and MPAJA members gathered at a small village near the caves for a secret conference, the Japanese staged a surprise raid at dawn. In the ensuing lopsided skirmish most of the CPM and MPAJA high command were destroyed. Lai Teck, who should have been at the meeting, wasn't. Subsequently, he claimed that he had been unable to attend because his car broke down.

The MCP adopted a new party program after the end of World War II and the liberation of Malaya from Japanese forces. Seeking to reconcile its own goals and that of the British, which had provided the MCP with training, and logistical and material support during the Japanese occupation of Malaya, the new program sought an alliance with Allied forces and called for self-governance with the aim of eventually achieving independence, going against the party's wartime policy, which had advocated independence upon the expulsion of Japan. In an accompanying document, Lai Teck placed emphasis on the party's political struggle, arguing that if the party were to "adopt armed struggle immediately we would become isolated and alienated from the people. This is a kind of leftist Blanquist revolutionary action that is not suitable for the present circumstances...".

While the true scope of opposition to Lai Teck and the new program remains unclear, scholar Marc H. Opper concludes that it had reached a level that required direct refutation by the party's leadership (i.e., Lai Teck), and that a split had occurred over the party's new direction. For example, an incident where the Kedah state committee opted to enforce the party's wartime program required the intervention of Chin Peng at the behest of Lai Teck, who managed to resolve the conflict peacefully.

== Disappearance ==
In 1946, rumours which had been circulating within the party about disloyalty on the part of Lai Teck began to receive more substantiation. This was exacerbated by the restlessness of the rank and file, especially the younger members, who favoured radical action. Lai Teck was removed from some sensitive posts, and an investigation began into his activities. A full meeting of the Central Executive Committee was scheduled for 6 March 1947 at which the complaints against Lai Teck were to be aired in his presence. Lai Teck did not attend but instead absconded with the bulk of the party's funds, hiding first in Singapore, then going to Hong Kong and later to Thailand.

== Aftermath ==
With Lai Teck gone, the party elected a new leader, Chin Peng. According to Chin Peng, he personally went to Bangkok and Hong Kong in 1947, contacted the communist party organizations there and asked them to help him to track down and kill Lai Teck; both the Vietnamese and Thai communists assisted Chin Peng in the manhunt; and eventually, Chin Peng was told by the Thai Communist leader that Lai Teck was accidentally killed in Bangkok some time when three Thai Communists tried to capture him. Reportedly, Lai Teck was suffocated during the struggle, after which his body was put into a gunny sack and tossed into the Menam River.

== See also ==
- List of people who disappeared
