= Abdullah CD =

Malaysian politician (1923–2024)

Chairman of the Central Committee of the Malayan Communist Party
- In office 1988 – 2 December 1989
- Preceded by: Musa Ahmad

Politburo Member of the Malayan Communist Party
- In office 15 May 1957 – 2 December 1989

Commander of the 10th Malay Regiment of the Malayan National Liberation Army
- In office 21 May 1949 – 2 December 1989

Personal details
- Born: Cik Dat bin Anjang Abdullah; 2 October 1923 Lambor Kiri, Parit, Perak, Federated Malay States, British Malaya
- Died: 13 January 2024 (aged 100) Sukhirin, Narathiwat, Thailand
- Party: Communist Party of Malaya
- Other political affiliations: Malay Nationalist Party; Revolutionary Malay National Party of Malaya
- Spouse: Suriani Abdullah (m. 1955; died 2013)
- Children: 1
- Relatives: Yeop Mahidin (cousin)
- Education: Clifford School, Kuala Kangsar
- Known for: Key figure in the Malayan Emergency

Military service
- Allegiance: Malayan National Liberation Army
- Years of service: 1949–1989
- Unit: 10th Malay Regiment
- Battles/wars: Malayan Emergency: Ulu Teka Skirmish; Battle of Jalan Chonur

Cik Dat bin Anjang Abdullah (2 October 1923 – 13 January 2024), commonly known as Abdullah CD, was a Malaysian politician who served as chairman and General Secretary of the Communist Party of Malaya (CPM)

== Early life and career ==
Abdullah was born on 2 October 1923, in Parit, Perak, to Malay parents of Minangkabau descent. His political involvement was sparked by interest in the Maharajalela Wars against the British. According to his memoir, Abdullah recounts that an Indonesian acquaintance, Pak Inu lent Abdullah works by Indonesian left-wing activists, particularly that of Tan Malaka, and discussed issues of colonialism and independence with him. As a young man, he joined the Kesatuan Melayu Muda (KMM). He became KMM secretary in the Lambor district in Perak during the early stages of the Japanese occupation.

After World War II, Abdullah CD was involved in the setting up of the Malay Nationalist Party (in Malay, the Parti Kebangsaan Melayu Muda; PKMM) in October 1945 with other early leftist Malay leaders such as Mokhtaruddin Lasso, Dr. Burhanuddin al-Helmy, Ahmad Boestamam, Ishak Haji Muhammad, amongst others.

He was also responsible for organising the Malay labour movement and was elected vice-president of the Pan-Malayan Federation of Trade Unions (PMFTU).

Not long before the declaration of emergency in Malaya in June 1948 by the British colonial government, Abdullah CD, Dr Burhanuddin Helmi, and Ahmad Boestamam met to discuss the conditions and the steps to be taken in the struggle for Malayan independence. When the British declared an emergency, Abdullah led many members from the CPM, PKMM, API (Angkatan Pemuda Insaf), AWAS, and PETA into an anti-British guerrilla revolution in the jungles of Malaya. In July 1948, he was captured in north Pahang, but he managed to escape.

On 12 May 1949, Abdullah started the 10th Regiment of the CPM in Temerloh, Pahang. In his later years, he was a Marxist-Leninist-Maoist.

Abdullah was involved in many armed battles against the British and suffered serious injuries from a hand grenade explosion.

Abdullah CD continued to be the leader of the 10th Regiment, until peace was achieved in 1989.

On 2 December 1989, he was one of the signatories of the peace agreement between the CPM and the government of Malaysia, finally ending the period of armed struggle.

== Personal life and death ==
Abdullah CD was married to Suriani Abdullah (née Eng Ming Ching), also a leader of the CPM in February 1955. They remained married in Sukhirin, Thailand until Suriani's death in 2013.

On 3 October 2023, Abdullah CD celebrated his 100th birthday, surrounded by well-wishers and former party members in the peace village in Sukhirin. He died at the Sukhirin Peace Village in Narathiwat, Thailand on 13 January 2024. He underwent a period of ailing health before his death.
