= Malayan National Liberation Army =

1949–1989 communist guerrilla army in Malaysia (formerly Malaya)

- 馬來亞民族解放軍; Tentera Pembebasan Nasional Malaya
- Flag of the Malayan National Liberation Army
- Leaders: Chin Peng; Abdullah CD; Rashid Maidin; Wu Yi-Shek
- Dates active: February 1, 1949 – December 2, 1989
- Allegiance: Communist Party of Malaya
- Groups: 10th MNLA Regiment; 12th MNLA Regiment; Min Yuen
- Active regions: Northern Malaya and Southern Thailand
- Ideology: Communism; Marxism–Leninism; Maoism
- Political position: Far-left
- Size: 8,000

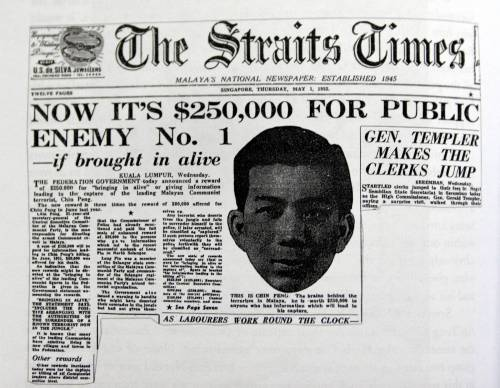
The Straits Times advertising cash bounties by the British military for the capture of MNLA leader Chin Peng. These bounties often backfired and turned Communist leaders into folk heroes.

The Malayan National Liberation Army (MNLA) was a Communist guerrilla army that fought for Malayan independence from the British Empire during the Malayan Emergency (1948–1960) and later fought against the Malaysian government in the Communist insurgency in Malaysia (1968–1989). Many MNLA fighters were former members of the Malayan Peoples' Anti-Japanese Army (MPAJA), including its leader Chin Peng.

The group was also referred to as the Malayan Races Liberation Army owing to a mistranslation.

In 1989 the Communist Party of Malaya signed a peace treaty with the Malaysian state, and the MNLA and the Party settled in villages in southern Thailand.

== Name and mistranslation ==
Malayan Races Liberation Army is a translation from the Chinese "馬來亞民族解放軍" where "民族" means "nationality" in the ethnic sense. Chin Peng has called this a mistranslation and offered the translation of Malayan National Liberation Army (MNLA). The group is also commonly known in Malay as (Malay: Tentera Pembebasan Rakyat Malaya), which could also be translated as the Malayan People's Liberation Army although extant records show that Tentera Pembebasan Nasional Malaya, a translation more in line with the translation offered by Chin Peng, became the normal self-identity by the 1970s.

== History ==
Prior to World War II, the Communist Party of Malaya (CPM) was banned. During the war, Britain trained and armed the Malayan People's Anti-Japanese Army (MPAJA), a guerrilla force to fight against the Japanese occupation of Malaya. The CPM participated in the MPAJA, and was granted legal recognition by the British after the war as a reward. CPM trade union activist Chin Peng was awarded the OBE for his service in the MPAJA. However, CPM members secretly kept some MPAJA weapons for future use.

The CPM used violence to support its union organisation, and the British restricted trade union activity, including banishing key Communist leaders not born locally. This mutual antagonism climaxed with an armed revolt in 1948, which resulted in the declaration of a state of emergency in June 1948.

=== Malayan Emergency (1948–1960) ===
On 16 June 1948, three British plantation managers were assassinated in Perak. In response to these murders, the British colonial authorities enacted emergency measures which included outlawing leftist parties and mass arrests of trade union activists and communists.

Fleeing the cities, the CPM (including Chin Peng) regrouped deep in the Malayan jungles and founded the Malayan National Liberation Army (MNLA).

To force the British to leave Malaya, the MNLA attacked soldiers, police, and colonial collaborators, and conducted industrial sabotage. During the early years of the Emergency, MNLA guerrillas destroyed rubber plantations to harm Britain economically, as Britain partially relied on the profits of the Malayan rubber trade to repay its war-time debt to the United States and for post-war social programs. These guerrillas were supported by a network of civilian supporters called the Min Yuen, whose members would live a normal life in towns while gathering intelligence, recruiting new members, spreading propaganda, and collecting supplies for the MNLA.

The MNLA allowed people of any race as well as women to join the guerrilla army as any prejudice between race and sex was believed by the MNLA and CPM to be a tool of capitalism to divide the working class. Due to their location deep within Malaya's jungles, the MNLA often came into contact with the aboriginal Orang Asli, recruiting them as trackers and using their villages as a food source. However, despite their attempts to recruit from all ethnic backgrounds, the MNLA membership was still overwhelmingly made up of ethnic Chinese.

Less than a month into the Emergency, Britain's High Commissioner in Malaya Edward Gent died in an airplane collision. In 1951, his replacement, Henry Gurney was assassinated by MNLA guerrillas in an ambush against his convoy near Fraser's Hill resort. The next High Commissioner was Gerald Templer, who is credited by many historians with being the most effective in defeating the MNLA. Templer oversaw the implementation of the Briggs Plan, the British military strategy to defeat Malaysian guerrillas by forcibly transferring most of Malaysia's rural ethnic Chinese population to a series of newly constructed settlements known as "New Villages". By early 1952 over 400,000 people (mostly ethnic Chinese) had been moved to the "New Villages". Templer also attempted to starve the MNLA out of the jungles by torching farmland, spraying chemical herbicides from airplanes to destroy crops, and enforcing a strict rationing system for Malayan villagers so that they could not share food with MNLA members. In the "New Village" of Tanjung Malim, the rice rations were halved after the population refused to give information on Communist activities in the region.

The Briggs Plan and the New Village internment camps had succeeded in separating the civilian population from the MNLA guerrillas in the jungles and severely damaged their ability to continue fighting. The food denial campaign also put great pressure on the MNLA and damaged their ability to conduct assaults against British positions.

The Emergency officially came to an end in 1960, although the MNLA had already been defeated as an effective fighting force for years.

=== Communist insurgency in Malaysia (1968–1989) ===
Defeated in the first Malayan emergency and outwitted in Singapore politics by nationalist politician Lee Kuan Yew, the CPM by the mid-1960s was fragmented. However, in 1968 the MNLA reappeared, operating from across the Thai border. They carried out ambushes, hit-and-run attacks, and laid traps for the Malaysian military. The MNLA fought in the highly forested area near the Thai border in the north of the Malay Peninsula. The MNLA was not able to reform to its former size and the CPM began recruitment of Thai Malays as well as distributing pamphlets preaching the compatibility between Islam and Communism. The MNLA had some success early on in the insurgency, at one point killing 17 members of the security forces in a single attack. In 1989, the CPM came to the negotiating table and reached an agreement with the Malaysian government which would allow CPM/MNLA members to return to Malaysia if they laid down their arms. Some CPM/MNLA members settled in "peace villages" in Southern Thailand, while others returned to Malaysia. However, Secretary-General of the CPM Chin Peng was subsequently denied the right to return to Malaysia despite the agreement.
