= Malayan Communist Party =

Far-left political party in Malaya

Communist Party of Malaya
- Malay name: Parti Komunis Malaya ڤرتي کومونيس ملايا
- Chinese name: 馬來亞共產黨 马来亚共产党; Má-lâi-a Kiōng-sán-tóng; Maa5 Loi4 Aa3 Gung6 Caan2 Dong2; Mǎláiyǎ Gòngchǎndǎng
- Tamil name: மலாயா பொதுவுடைமை கட்சி Malāyā Potuvuṭaimai Kaṭci
- Abbreviation: MCP, CPM, PKM
- Founders: Lei Kuang-juan; Wu Ching; Wei Ching-chow; Lin Ching-chung; Chen Shao-chang
- Founded: 30 April 1930
- Dissolved: 2 December 1989
- Preceded by: South Seas Communist Party
- Newspaper: Min Sheng Pau
- Paramilitary wing: • Malayan Peoples Anti-Japanese Army; • Malayan National Liberation Army
- Membership (1939): 40,000
- Ideology: Communism; Marxism–Leninism; Mao Zedong Thought; Anti-imperialism
- Political position: Far-left
- Colours: Red
- Slogan: "Kaum buruh semua negeri, bersatulah!" ("Workers of the world, unite!")

Party flag

The Malayan Communist Party (MCP), officially the Communist Party of Malaya (CPM), was a Marxist–Leninist and anti-imperialist communist party which was active in British Malaya and later, the modern states of Malaysia and Singapore from 1930 to 1989. It was responsible for the creation of both the Malayan Peoples' Anti-Japanese Army and the Malayan National Liberation Army.

The party led resistance efforts against the Japanese occupation of Malaya and Singapore during World War II, and later fought a war of national liberation against the British Empire during the Malayan Emergency. After the departure of British colonial forces from the Federation of Malaya, the party fought in a third guerrilla campaign against both the Malaysian and Singaporean governments in an attempt to create a communist state in the region, before disbanding in 1989. Today, due to historical connotations surrounding the MCP, communism as an ideology remains a taboo political topic in both countries.

== History ==
=== Early influences ===
The communist movement actually appeared in Pahang earlier around the middle of the 1920s. At that time, the Communist Youth League was formed in the Chinese settlement centers such as in Raub, Bentong, Mentakab and Manchis. The followers of this movement are mostly made up of Chinese students who are in their teens and early twenties. They have been taught the ideals of communism by some of their teachers and are usually encouraged to show opposition to capitalism, colonial oppression and western imperialism in their public meetings and discussion groups.

=== Formation ===
In April 1930 the South Seas Communist Party was dissolved and was replaced by the Communist Party of Malaya. While its primary responsibility was Malaya and Singapore, the party was also active in Thailand and the Dutch East Indies, which did not then have their own Communist parties.

=== Growth ===
The party operated as an illegal organisation under British colonial rule. On 29 April 1930, a raid conducted by the Singapore Special Branch on a vacant house at 24 Nassim Road in Singapore almost ended the MCP as eight of its original founding members were arrested before being imprisoned or deported back to China. In June 1931, after a Comintern courier was intercepted by the police, about six raids were conducted from June to December saw several party members were arrested and documents seized, sending the party into disarray. Information extracted from the courier indicated at this point there were 1,500 members and 10,000 sympathisers.

Despite this setback, the MCP gained influence in the trade union movement and organised several strikes, most notably at the Batu Arang coal mine in 1935. They also set up workers' committees at some workplaces. These committees, and the strikes, were promptly crushed by troops and police. Many ethnic Chinese strikers were deported to China, where they were often executed by the Chinese Nationalist government as Communists.

After Japan invaded China in 1937, there was a rapprochement between the Malayan Kuomintang and Communists, paralleling that in China. Under the wing of the Kuomintang, the MCP was able to operate more easily. Anti-Japanese sentiment among Malayan Chinese gave the party a great opportunity to recruit members and raise funds under the banner of defence of China.

At this time, the party was infiltrated by an apparent British agent, Lai Teck, who became its Secretary-General in April 1939. Despite this severe security breach, the Party continued to operate effectively. By mid-1939 it claimed about 40,000 members, about half in Singapore.

=== World War II and its aftermath ===
On 8 December 1941, the Empire of Japan invaded Malaya. The British colonial authorities now accepted the MCP's standing offer of military cooperation. On 15 December, all left-wing political prisoners were released.

Beginning 20 December, the British military trained selected MCP members in guerrilla warfare at the 101st Special Training School (101st STS) in Singapore. Roughly 165 cadres were trained before the fall of Singapore, after which they dispersed and began resistance operations.

Shortly before the Japanese captured Singapore, the MCP began organising armed resistance in Johore. By March 1942, several guerrilla groups had consolidated into the Malayan People's Anti-Japanese Army (MPAJA), quickly becoming the main anti-Japanese resistance force. Expanding through support from rural Chinese squatters, the MPAJA eventually reached a strength of over 6,000 fighters.

In September 1942, Japanese intelligence—assisted by information supplied by double agent Lai Teck—ambushed a major MCP–MPAJA leadership meeting at Batu Caves, killing most of the senior resistance leadership.

From 1943 onwards, contact with British Force 136 strengthened the MPAJA's operational capacity through airdropped supplies and coordination with Allied plans.

Japan's sudden surrender in August 1945 enabled the MPAJA to assume temporary local authority in many parts of Malaya until the arrival of British reoccupation forces in early September. While many guerrillas were celebrated as heroes, the MCP also carried out reprisals against collaborators and forcibly collected funds.

The MPAJA formally disbanded later that year, though many weapons were hidden for future use. After the war, the MCP operated legally but adopted a "National Front" strategy of political, labour, and mass-movement organising.

In 1946, investigations into Lai Teck confirmed his collaboration with British, Japanese, and French intelligence services. He fled Malaya with party funds in 1947, severely damaging the party's prestige and cohesion. Chin Peng was appointed General Secretary shortly afterwards.

=== Malayan Emergency ===
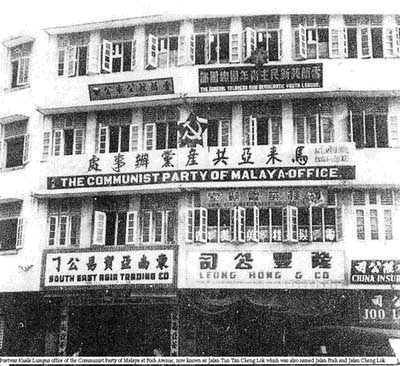
The Party's office before the Emergency, Foch Avenue (now Jalan Tun Tan Cheng Lock), Kuala Lumpur, 1948.

In June 1948, rising tension culminated in the murders of several plantation managers in Perak. The colonial government declared a state of emergency on 16 June 1948, outlawed trade-union federations, and banned the MCP on 23 July.

MCP militants reorganised into the Malayan Peoples' Anti-British Army (MPABA), later renamed the Malayan National Liberation Army (MNLA) in February 1949. The MNLA operated through a Central Military Committee aligned with the Politburo. Leading military figures included:

- Chin Peng
- Yeung Kwo
- Lau Lee

By 1950, the MNLA reached a strength of about 4,000 troops, roughly 10% of them women. The parallel civilian underground, the Min Yuen, enabled intelligence-gathering, logistics, and recruitment.

British counterinsurgency—especially the resettlement of 500,000 rural Chinese into guarded New Villages under the Briggs Plan—significantly weakened the MNLA by restricting food and shelter. By 1953, the guerrillas were suffering shortages and diminished operational capability.

In late 1955, Chin Peng met representatives of the Malayan government, including Tunku Abdul Rahman, at the Baling Talks. Negotiations collapsed when the government refused to legalise the MCP.

The Emergency was officially declared over on 31 July 1960, though security restrictions continued in northern Malaya.

=== Post-1960 ===
After 1960, MCP remnants retreated to the Malaysia–Thailand border. By the mid-1960s, total membership had declined to around 2,000.

In 1969, the MCP reactivated armed struggle, supported indirectly from bases in China through the Suara Revolusi Malaya radio service in Hunan, which broadcast until 1981 at China's request.

Internal paranoia, purges, and factional splits (notably the Marxist–Leninist and Revolutionary factions, which later formed the Malaysian Communist Party) weakened the movement in the 1970s.

In 1989, the MCP agreed to a final peace settlement at Hat Yai, Thailand. Separate peace agreements were signed with both Malaysia and Thailand on 2 December 1989. The MCP formally dissolved that same day, ending nearly six decades of communist activity in Malaya.

== MCP manifestos ==
From time to time the MCP released policy statements or manifestos to the public.

- 1940 — Manifesto calling for expulsion of British imperialism.
- February 1943 — Anti-Japanese Programme (nine points).
- 27 August 1945 — Eight Point Manifesto. Moderate demands for self-government, civil liberties, wages, and trade freedoms.
- 7 November 1945 — Proposals to the BMA including full self-government.

== MCP newspapers ==
- Charn Yew Pau — Published for MPAJA Ex-Service Comrades.
- MCP Review — Active in 1948; covered agrarian struggles in Perak.
- Min Pao — Published in Seremban; closed in 1946.
- Min Sheng Pau — Largest Chinese-language daily; MCP's principal publication.
- Sin Min Chu — Founded 1945/46; emphasised democratic anti-imperialist struggle.

== Prominent members ==
- Chin Peng — General Secretary (1947–1989).
- Abdullah CD — MCP Chairman (1988–1989); Hat Yai signatory; long-serving Malay cadre.
- Lai Teck — General Secretary (1939–1947); British/Japanese triple agent.
- Yeung Kwo — Deputy General Secretary (1947–1956).
- Lee An Tong — Deputy General Secretary (1960–1989); CEC member (elected 1946).
- Chang Ling-Yun — CPM Beijing-based leader (1953–1964); Secretary of North Malayan Bureau (1964–1989).
- Wu Yi Shek — Member of the Politburo of the CPM and Political Commissar for the 12th MNLA Regiment.
- Shan Ruhong — Member of the Politburo of the CPM.
- Zainon Chan — Member of the Politburo of the CPM.
- Rashid Maidin — Member of the Central Committee of the CPM and Hat Yai Peace Agreement signatory.
- Toh Kar Lim — Member of the Central Committee of the CPM.
- Chen Tien — Propaganda chief, Member of the Central Committee of the CPM and a representative of Baling Talks.
- Abu Samad Mohd Kassim — Member of the Central Committee of the MCP and leading member of the 10th MNLA Regiment.
- Suriani Abdullah — Veteran MCP cadre; Member of the Central Committee of CPM and leading member of the 10th MNLA Regiment.
- Ibrahim Chik — Member of the Central Committee of the MCP and leading member of the 10th MNLA Regiment.
- Wahi Annuar — 10th MNLA Regiment leader; surrendered 1950.
- R. G. Balan — MPAJA officer; labour organiser; arrested 1948.
- Shamsiah Fakeh — AWAS leader; prominent Malay communist.
- Musa Ahmad — CPM chairman (1955–1968); surrendered 1980.
- S. A. Ganapathy — PMFTU President; executed 1949 for weapon possession.
- Liew Kon Kim — Notorious fighter ("the bearded terror"), killed 1952.
- Lau Mah — MPAJA 5th Regiment; CEC member; killed 1949.
- Lau Yew — Senior military commander; killed 1948.
- Lee Soong — MCP delegate to the 1948 Calcutta Youth Conference.
- Liew Yit Fan — Editor of Min Sheng Pao; arrested 1948.
- Lim Ah Liang — Head of MCP (Singapore), 1946.
- Soon Kwong — Selangor MPAJU General Secretary; arrested 1945.
- Wu Tien Wang — MCP representative on British Advisory Council (Singapore), 1945.
- Eu Chooi Yip — MCP Singapore leader; superior of "The Plen".
- Fong Chong Pik — Senior CPM Singapore cadre ("The Plen").
- Kamarulzaman Teh — API youth leader; anti-Japanese fighter.
- L. Ramasamy — Former 10th Regiment fighter known as Komrad Asi.
- Mohd Yatim Ayob — MNLA fighter, Perak.

== See also ==
- General Secretary of the Communist Party of Malaya
- List of political parties in Malaysia
- Communist Party of Malaya/Marxist–Leninist
- Communist Party of Indonesia
- Malaysian Communist Party
- Communist Party of Malaya/Revolutionary Faction
- North Kalimantan Communist Party
