= Sungai Siput incident =

1948 start of the Malayan Emergency

Sungai Siput Incident
- Part of Malayan Emergency
- Sungai Siput incident (Peninsular Malaysia)
Date	16 June 1948
Location	Sungai Siput, Perak, Malaya
Result	Communist victory

Belligerents
United Kingdom	Malayan Communist Party

Commanders and leaders
3 people at Sungai Siput †	Chin Peng; S. A. Ganapathy

Casualties and losses
3 killed	None

The Sungai Siput incident marked the beginning of the Malayan Emergency on 16 June 1948. Three European plantation managers were killed at Sungai Siput, Perak in two different rubber estates – the Elphil estate and Phin Soon estate. Other estate owners were also targeted, though unsuccessful. Following the incidents, a state of emergency – initially confined to Perak and Johor – was declared on the same day. A police raid was conducted against Chin Peng, though Peng managed to flee. The emergency was extended to the entirety of British Malaya two days later.

== Background ==
Sungai Siput is a town north of Ipoh in Perak, Malaysia. Sungai Siput had many rubber plantations and tin mines. Following the arrest of R. Belan on 30 May, the president of the Perak Rubber Workers' Union, the MCP decided to increase their pressure against the British government. On the same day, 640 plantation workers stopped working. Plantation managers, led by Boris Hembry, the vice-chairman of the Perak Planters' Association, persuaded Perak's chief police officer to take action against the plantation workers. The chief police officer organised a meeting with Perak's British adviser and state first minister on 1 June and all agreed to take action. Two companies of Gurkhas were sent to Sungai Siput from 2 to 10 June and escorted Tamils back to work. Once the Gurkhas left the town, the local MCP decided to target rubber plantation managers in the area as an extension of the party's anti-konchak policy.

== Attacks ==
On 16 June 1948, three Malayan Communist party (MCP) members cycled to Elphil Estate at about 8:30 am British Malayan Standard Time (1:00 am UTC), located 9.7 kilometres (6.0 mi) north of Sungai Siput. One of them entered the office of Arthur Walker, the manager of the plantation, and greeted him. As Walker was exchanging the greeting, the assassin shot him two times at close range, with the other two firing shots at the office window. The perpetrators cycled away, and Walker's wife, who was in Kuala Kangsar, had to be called back.

Twelve MCP members went to the Phin Soon Estate just before 9:00 am (1:30 am UTC) and tied the hands of John Allison, the manager of the plantation, and Ian Christian, Allison's assistant. The squad marched the two to a nearby bungalow and searched for weapons. Afterwards, they were marched back into the office verandah and shot. The perpetrators took a $1,000 before burning a smokehouse filled with rubber and cycling off.

According to Chin Peng in his autobiography, Walker and Allison had a history of mistreating workers and breaking up worker strikes, while Christian was only a recruit and killed without justification. (Note: Historian Karl Hack notes that Peng did not provide any evidence for his claims, suggesting that Peng used general MCP rationale for selecting targets to explain the killings; MCP propaganda stated that managers, foremen, and Europeans were safe if they "acted in the best interests of the people".) Attackers also arrived at the Sungei Krudda and Reyla estates, though the managers were not present. They also tried to see the managers at the Klabang and Strathsila estates, but were unsuccessful. Europeans in Sungai Siput fled to the Kaumintang Estate, but would return to their plantations by the evening.

== Aftermath ==
The three murdered planters were buried at the Batu Gajah Cemetary on 16 June 1948. Following the incident, plantations in Sungai Siput hired bodyguards for protection.

A delegation by Sungai Siput planters was sent to Kuala Lumpur, and demanded "ruthless action". A state of emergency was declared in areas in Perak and Johor affected most by the incident on 16 June. Following an editorial published by The Straits Times demanding that the government expedite its approval of the emergency powers bill, the state of emergency was extended to the entirety of both states. A police raid was conducted against Chin Peng on the same day, who was staying at a bungalow 64.4 kilometres (40.0 mi) south of Sungai Siput. Peng – who did not anticipate that the British would declare a state of emergency – narrowly avoided the police and fled to a tin mine owner's bungalow near Kampar. The emergency was extended the entirety of Malaya on 18 June. Under these measures, the colonial government outlawed the MCP and began mass arresting thousands of trade unions and left-wing activists.
