= Malayan Emergency =

1948–1960 British colonial war in Malaya

Malayan Emergency Darurat Malaya 馬來亞緊急狀態 மலாயா அவசரகாலம்
- Part of the decolonization of Asia and Cold War in Asia
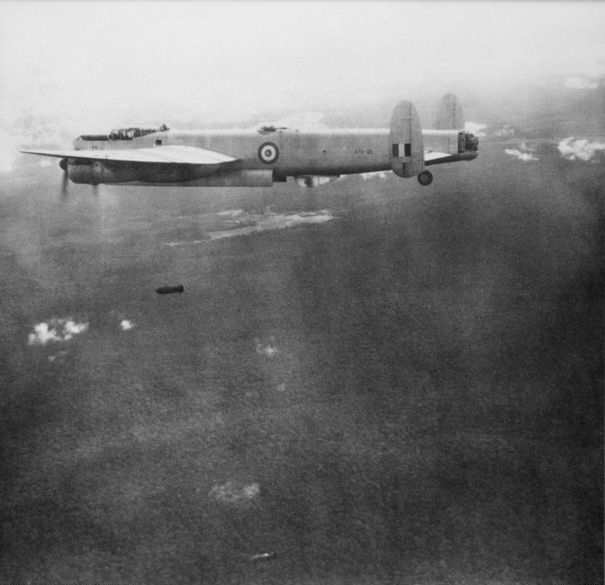
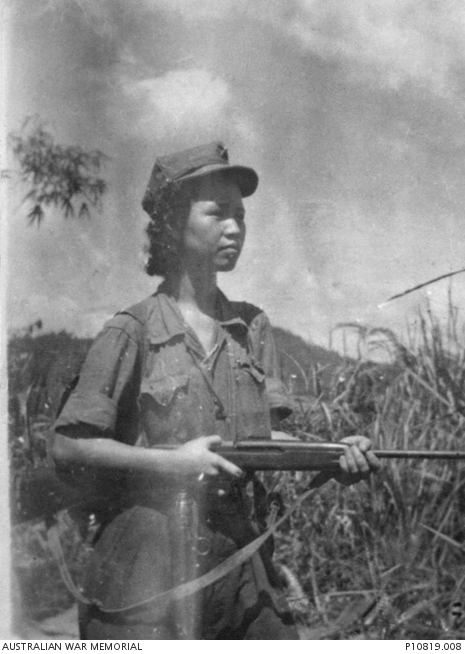
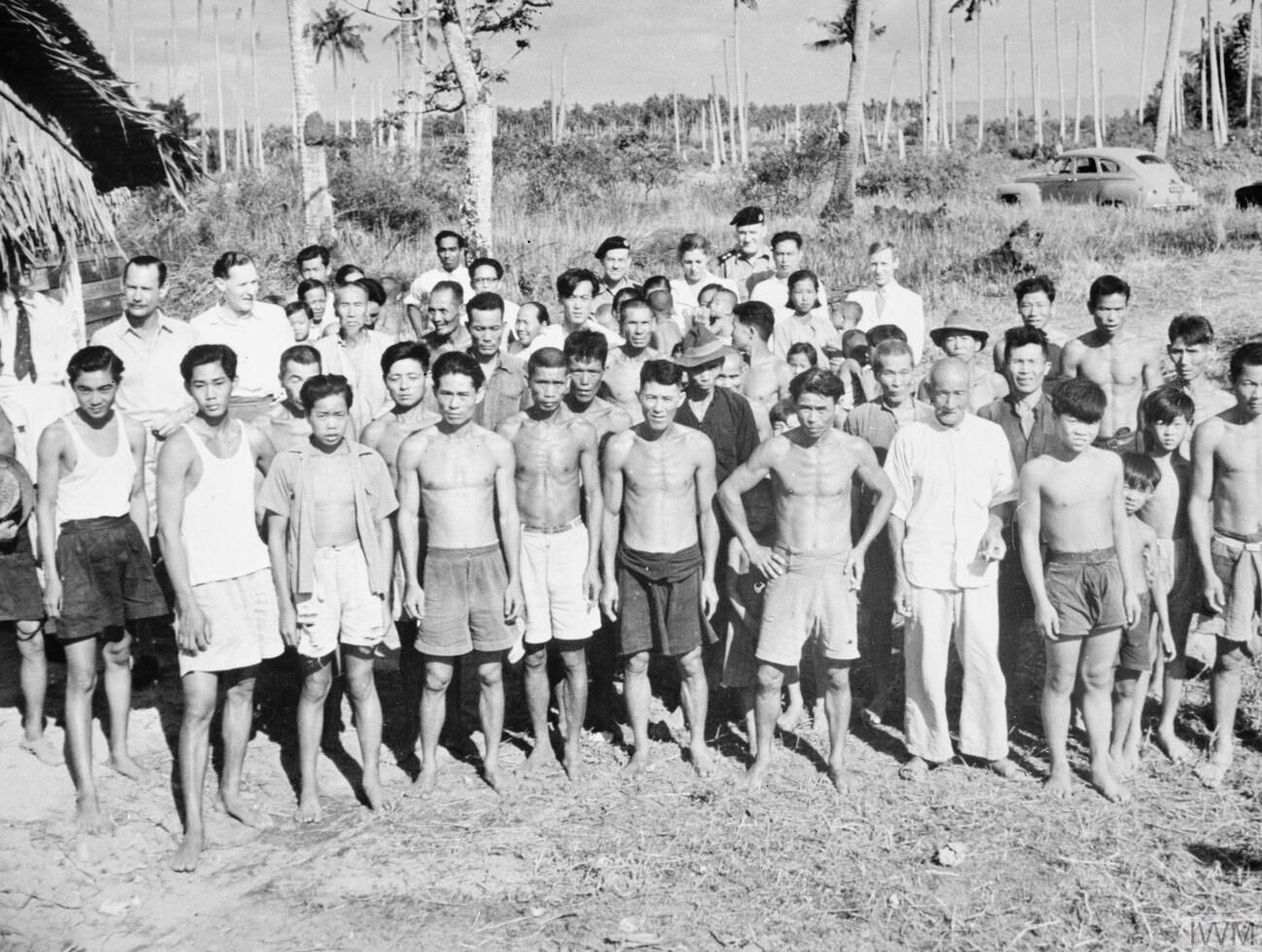
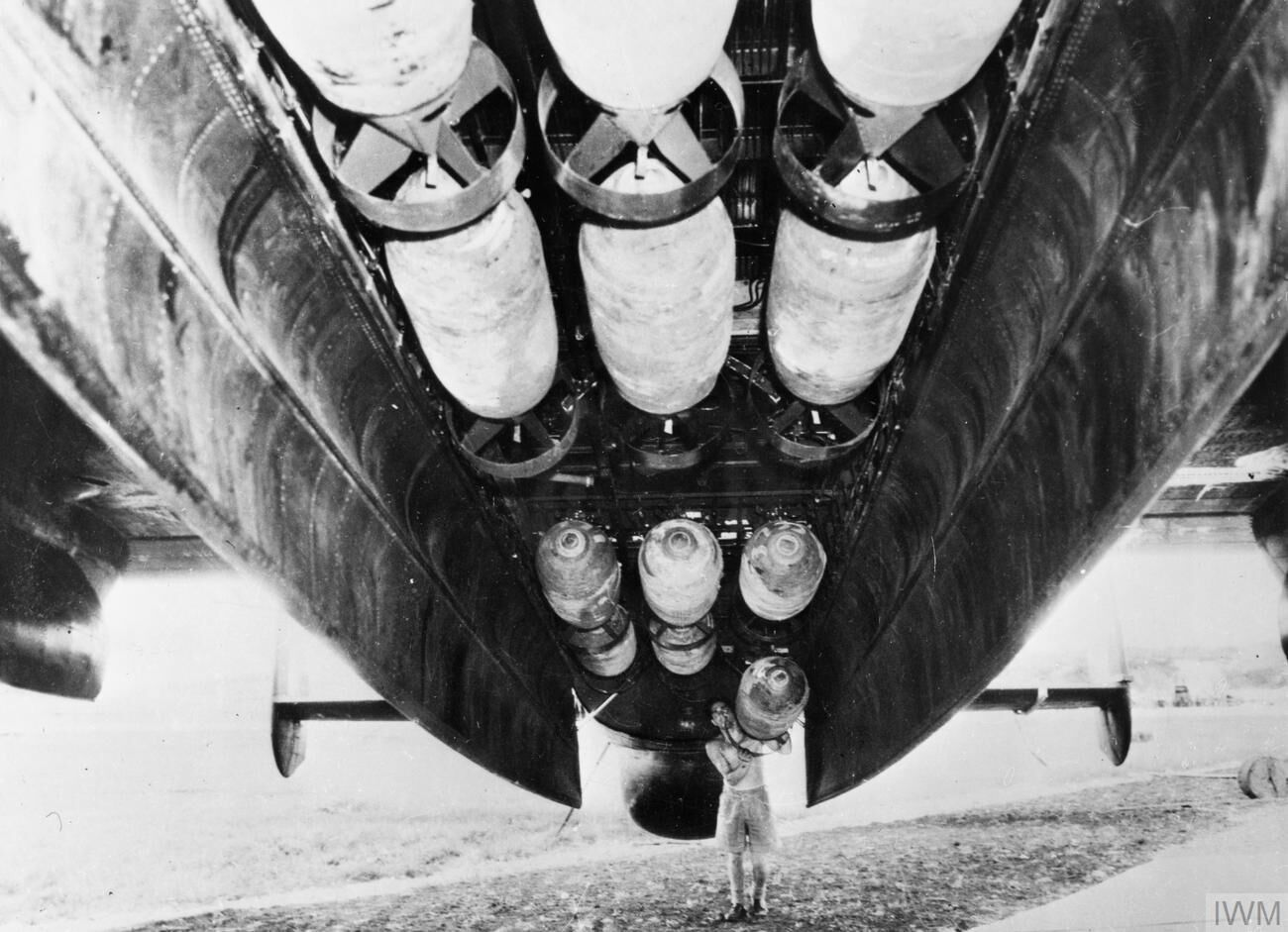
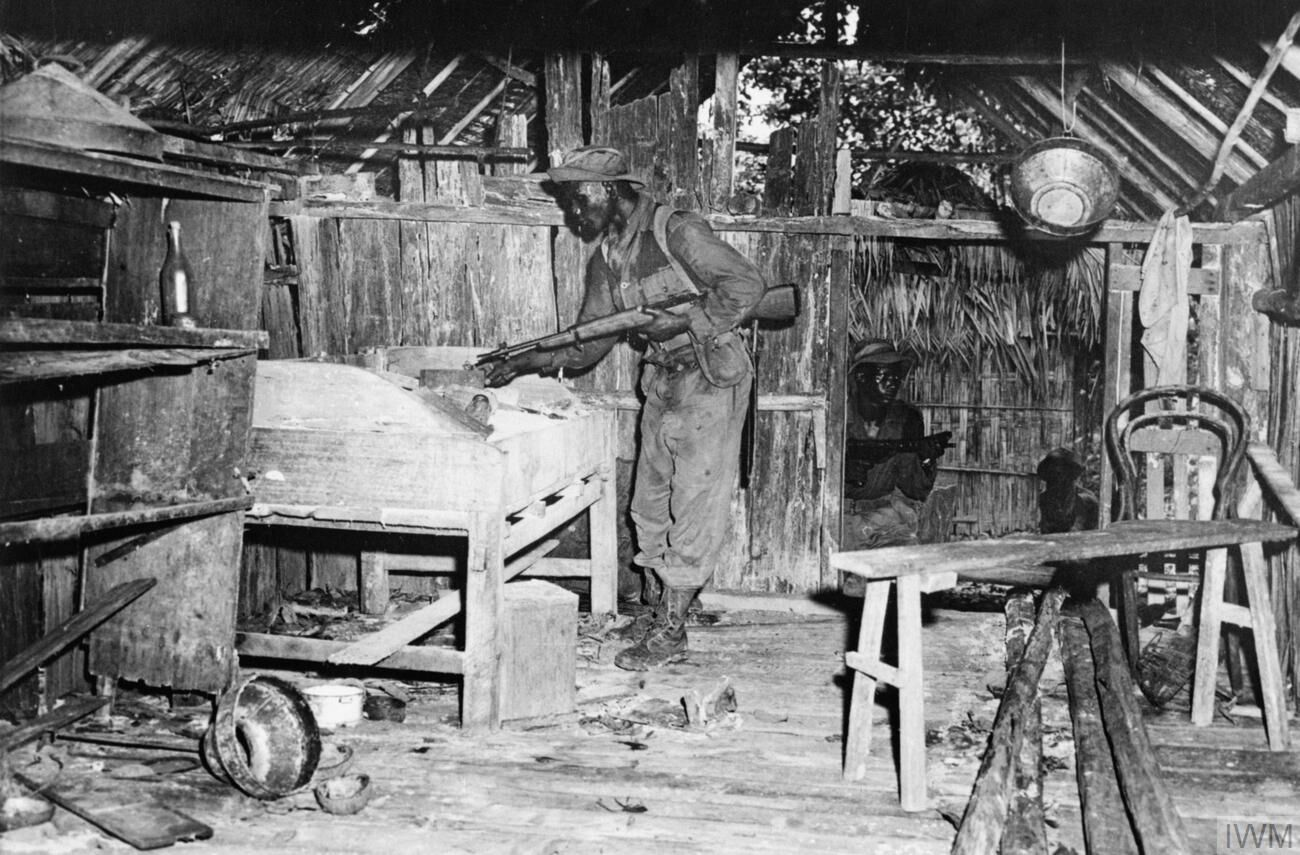
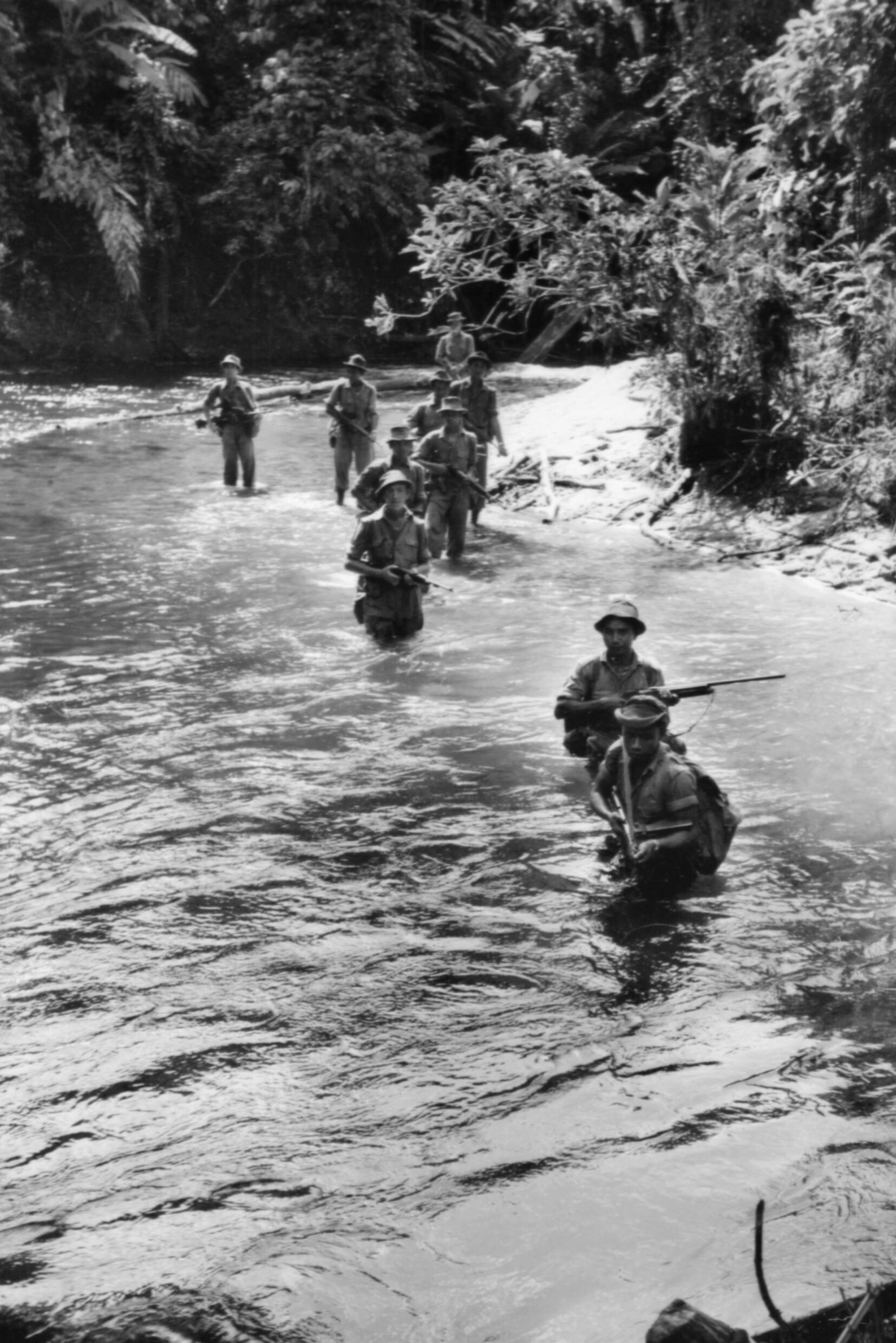
- Clockwise from top left: Australian Avro Lincoln bomber dropping 500lb bombs; Communist leader Lee Meng in 1952; RAF loading bombs to be used against MNLA forces; Malay Police Field Force during a jungle patrol; King's African Rifles search abandoned hut; Civilians forcibly evicted from their land by the British as part of the Briggs Plan
| Date | 16 June 1948 – 31 July 1960 (12 years, 1 month and 15 days) |
| Location | British Malaya |
| Result | Commonwealth victory |

Belligerents
| Commonwealth of Nations; Malaya (Note: British protectorate until 1957); United Kingdom; Singapore (Note: Partial (1955–1959) and full autonomous colony from 1959 onwards); Malacca (until 1957); Penang (until 1957); Kenya; Southern Rhodesia (until 1953); Rhodesia and Nyasaland (from 1953); Fiji; Australia; New Zealand | Malayan Communist Party; Malayan National Liberation Army |

Commanders and leaders
| United Kingdom: Clement Attlee (until 1951); Winston Churchill (1951–1955); Anthony Eden (1955–1957); Harold Macmillan (1957–1960); Harold Briggs; Roy Urquhart; Edward Gent; Henry Gurney X; Gerald Templer; William Goode; Malaya: Abdul Rahman of Negeri Sembilan; Tunku Abdul Rahman; Tun Razak; Tun Ismail; H. S. Lee; Singapore: David Marshall; Lim Yew Hock; Yusof Ishak; Lee Kuan Yew; Australia: Robert Menzies; Henry Wells; New Zealand: Sidney Holland (1951–1957); Walter Nash (1957–1960) | Malayan Communist Party: Chin Peng; Yeung Kwo †; Lee An Tong; Chang Ling-Yun; Malayan National Liberation Army (MNLA): Abdullah CD; Rashid Maidin; Shamsiah Fakeh; S. A. Ganapathy (executed); Lau Yew †; Mat Indera (executed); Lee Meng; Toh Kar Lim; Liew Kon Kim |

Strength
| Over 451,000 troops: 250,000 Malayan Home Guard (Malayan Regiment) troops; 40,000 regular Commonwealth personnel; King's African Rifles; Gurkha regiments; 37,000 Special Constables; 24,000 Federation Police; Unknown number of Orang Asli allies; Over 1,000 Iban (Dayak) headhunters | Over 7,000 troops 7,000 MNLA full-time troops (1951); 200–400 former Japanese troops Unknown number of Orang Asli allies Unknown number of Min Yuen civilian supporters |

Casualties and losses
| 1,443 killed 1,346 killed 2,406 wounded 39 killed 15 killed 8 killed | 6,710 killed 226 executed 1,289 wounded 1,287 captured 2,702 surrendered |
- Civilians killed: 2,478; Civilians missing: 810; Civilian casualties: 5,000+ Total killed: 11,107

The Malayan Emergency, also known as the Anti–British National Liberation War, (Note: by the Malayan National Liberation Army (MNLA)) (1948–1960) was a guerrilla war fought in Malaya between communist pro-independence fighters of the Malayan National Liberation Army (MNLA) and the military forces of the Federation of Malaya and the Commonwealth (British Empire). The MNLA fought to win Malayan independence from the British Empire and to establish a communist state, while the Malayan Federation and Commonwealth forces fought to protect British economic and colonial interests and combat communism. The term "Emergency" was used by the British to characterise the conflict in order to avoid referring to it as a war, because London-based insurers would not pay out in instances of civil wars.

The war began on 17 June 1948. British forces had killed a number of left-wing activists in Malaya, and following several retaliatory attacks on plantations the British declared a state of emergency. The leader of the Malayan Communist Party (MCP), Chin Peng, along with his allies, fled into the jungle and formed the MNLA to wage a war for national liberation against British colonial rule. Many MNLA fighters were veterans of the Malayan Peoples' Anti-Japanese Army (MPAJA), a communist guerrilla army previously trained, armed and funded by the British to fight against Japan during World War II. The communists gained support from many civilians, mainly those from the Chinese community. The communists' belief in class consciousness, ethnic equality, and gender equality inspired many women and indigenous people to join both the MNLA and its undercover supply network, the Min Yuen. Additionally, hundreds of former Japanese soldiers joined the MNLA. After establishing a series of jungle bases, the MNLA began raiding British colonial police and military installations.

The British attempted to starve the MNLA using scorched earth policies, including food rationing, killing livestock, and aerial spraying of the herbicide Agent Orange. British units carried out extrajudicial killings of unarmed civilians, in violation of the Geneva Conventions. The most infamous example is the Batang Kali massacre, which the press has referred to as "Britain's My Lai". (Note: e.g. The Times 2012, The Independent 2015, The Guardian 2012. While the phrase has often been used in the British press, the scholar Matthew Hughes has pointed out in the journal Small Wars & Insurgencies that in terms of the number killed, the massacre at Batang Kali is not of a comparable magnitude to the one at Mỹ Lai.) The Briggs Plan forcibly relocated a million civilians into concentration camps called "new villages". Many Orang Asli indigenous communities were also targeted for internment because the British believed that they were supporting the communists. The widespread decapitation of people suspected to have been guerrillas led to the 1952 British Malayan headhunting scandal. Similar scandals relating to atrocities committed by British forces included the public display of corpses.

British armed forces suffered well over a thousand casualties, making the emergency Britain's deadliest operational theatre since the Second World War. The emergency has often been compared to the Vietnam War, which included similar tactics and terrain. However, the Vietnam War involved large field armies of rival states with over a quarter million combatants and over 100,000 insurgents, whereas the emergency was mostly a low-intensity insurgency; the MNLA never numbered more than 8,000 members at a time. Still, some 11,000 people died in the emergency. Although the emergency was declared over in 1960, communist leader Chin Peng renewed the insurgency against the Malaysian government in 1968. This second phase of the insurgency lasted until the dissolution of the MCP in 1989.

== Origins ==
=== Socioeconomic issues (1941–1948) ===
The economic disruption of World War II (WWII) on British Malaya led to widespread unemployment, low wages, and high levels of food price inflation. The weak economy was a factor in the growth of trade union movements and caused a rise in communist party membership, with considerable labour unrest and a large number of strikes occurring between 1946 and 1948. Malayan communists organised a successful 24-hour general strike on 29 January 1946, before organising 300 strikes in 1947.

To combat rising trade union activity the British used police and soldiers as strikebreakers, and employers enacted mass dismissals, forced evictions of striking workers from their homes, legal harassment, and began cutting the wages of their workers. Colonial police responded to rising trade union activity through arrests, deportations, and beating striking workers to death. Responding to the attacks against trade unions, communist militants began assassinating strikebreakers, and attacking anti-union estates. These attacks were used by the colonial occupation as a pretext to conduct mass arrests of left-wing activists. On 12 June the British colonial occupation banned the PMFTU, Malaya's largest trade union.

Malaya's rubber and tin resources were used by the British to pay war debts to the United States and to recover from the damage of WWII. Malaysian rubber exports to the United States were of greater value than all domestic exports from Britain to America, causing Malaya to be viewed by the British as a vital asset. Britain had prepared for Malaya to become an independent state, but only by handing power to a government which would be subservient to Britain and allow British businesses to keep control of Malaya's natural resources. Under Britain's proposal, a British High Commissioner would choose the members of the Executive Council and the Legislative Council. Ninety percent of Malay Chinese, who made up 40 percent of the population, would not be given citizenship in the new state.

=== Sungai Siput incident (1948) ===
The first shots of the Malayan Emergency were fired during the Sungai Siput incident, on June 17, 1948, in the office of the Elphil Estate near the town of Sungai Siput. Three European plantation managers were killed by three young Chinese men suspected to have been communists.

The deaths of these European plantation managers was used by the British colonial administration to either arrest or kill many of Malaya's communist and trade union leaders. These mass arrests and killings saw many left-wing activists going into hiding and fleeing into the Malayan jungles.

=== Origin and formation of the MNLA (1949) ===
Although the Malayan communists had begun preparations for a guerrilla war against the British, the emergency measures and mass arrest of communists and left-wing activists in 1948 took them by surprise. Led by Chin Peng the remaining Malayan communists retreated to rural areas and formed the Malayan National Liberation Army (MNLA) on 1 February 1949.

The MNLA was partly a re-formation of the Malayan Peoples' Anti-Japanese Army (MPAJA), the communist guerrilla force which had been the principal resistance in Malaya against the Japanese occupation during WWII. The British had secretly helped form the MPAJA in 1942 and trained them in the use of explosives, firearms and radios. Chin Peng was a veteran anti-fascist and trade unionist who had played an integral role in the MPAJA's resistance. Disbanded in December 1945, the MPAJA officially turned in its weapons to the British Military Administration, although many MPAJA soldiers secretly hid stockpiles of weapons in jungle hideouts. Members who agreed to disband were offered economic incentives. Around 4,000 members rejected these incentives and went underground.

The MNLA began their war for Malayan independence from the British Empire by targeting the colonial resource extraction industries, namely the tin mines and rubber plantations which were the main sources of income for the British occupation of Malaya. The MNLA attacked these industries in the hopes of bankrupting the British and winning independence by making the colonial administration too expensive to maintain.

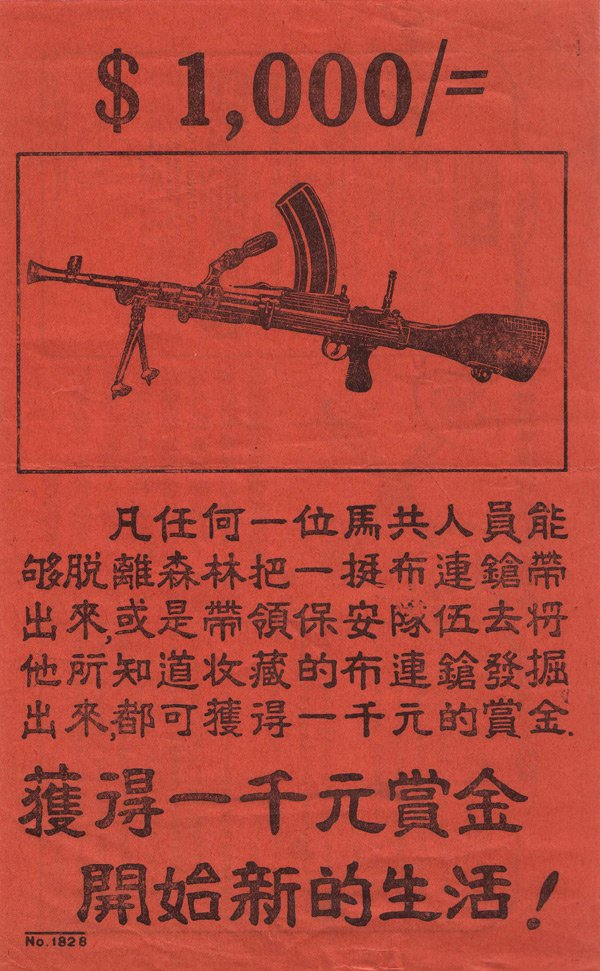
Commonwealth propaganda leaflet dropped across Malaya, urging people to come forward with a Bren gun and receive a $1,000 reward

== History ==
=== Communist guerrilla strategies ===
The Malayan National Liberation Army (MNLA) employed guerrilla tactics, attacking military and police outposts, sabotaging rubber plantations and tin mines, while also destroying transport and communication infrastructure. Support for the MNLA mainly came from the 3.12 million ethnic Chinese living in Malaya, many of whom were farmers living on the edges of the Malayan jungles and had been politically influenced by both the Chinese Communist Revolution and the resistance against Japan during WWII. Their support allowed the MNLA to supply themselves with food, medicine, information, and provided a source of new recruits. The ethnic Malay population supported them in smaller numbers. The MNLA gained the support of the Chinese because the Chinese were denied the equal right to vote in elections, had no land rights to speak of, and were usually very poor. The MNLA's supply organisation was called the Min Yuen (People's Movement). It had a network of contacts within the general population. Besides supplying material, especially food, it was also important to the MNLA as a source of intelligence. The MNLA and their supporters refer to the conflict as the Anti-British National Liberation War.

The MNLA's camps and hideouts were in the inaccessible tropical jungle and had limited infrastructure. Almost 90% of MNLA guerrillas were ethnic Chinese, though there were some Malays, Indonesians and Indians among its members. The MNLA was organised into regiments, although these had no fixed establishments and each included all communist forces operating in a particular region. The regiments had political sections, commissars, instructors and secret service. In the camps, the soldiers attended lectures on Marxism–Leninism, and produced political newsletters to be distributed to civilians.

In the early stages of the conflict, the guerrillas envisaged establishing control in "liberated areas" from which the government forces had been driven, but did not succeed in this.

=== British and Commonwealth strategies ===
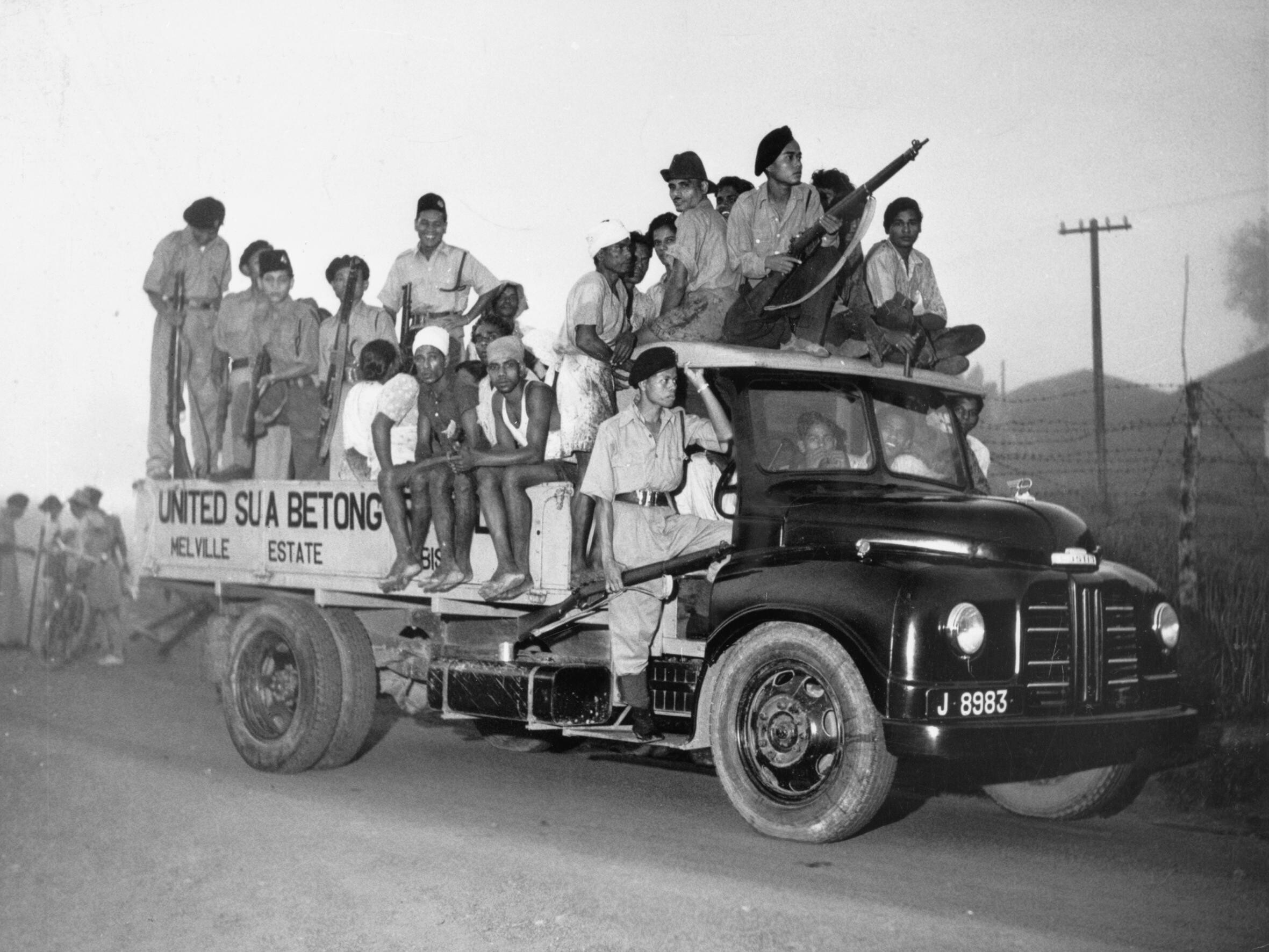
Workers on a rubber plantation in Malaya travel to work under the protection of Special Constables, whose function was to guard them throughout the working day against attack by communist forces, 1950.

During the first two years of the Emergency, British forces conducted a 'counter-terror' campaign, characterised by high levels of state coercion against civilian populations; including sweeps, cordons, large-scale deportation, and capital charges against suspected guerrillas. Police corruption and the British military's widespread destruction of farmland and burning of homes belonging to villagers rumoured to be helping communists, led to a sharp increase in civilians joining the MNLA and communist movement. However, these tactics also prevented the communists from establishing liberated areas (the MCPs first, and foremost objective), successfully broke up larger guerrilla formations, and shifted the MNLA's plan of securing territory, to one of widespread sabotage.

Commonwealth forces struggled to fight guerrillas who moved freely in the jungle and enjoyed support from rural Chinese populations. British planters and miners, who bore the brunt of the communist attacks, began to talk about government incompetence and being betrayed by Whitehall.

The initial government strategy was primarily to guard important economic targets, such as mines and plantation estates. In April 1950, General Sir Harold Briggs was sent to Malaya to enact the Briggs Plan. The central tenet of the Briggs Plan was to segregate MNLA guerrillas from their supporters among the population. A major component of the Briggs Plan involved targeting the MNLA's food supplies, which were supplied from three main sources: food grown by the MNLA in the jungle, food supplied by the Orang Asli aboriginal people living in the jungles and MNLA supporters within the 'squatter' communities on the jungle fringes.

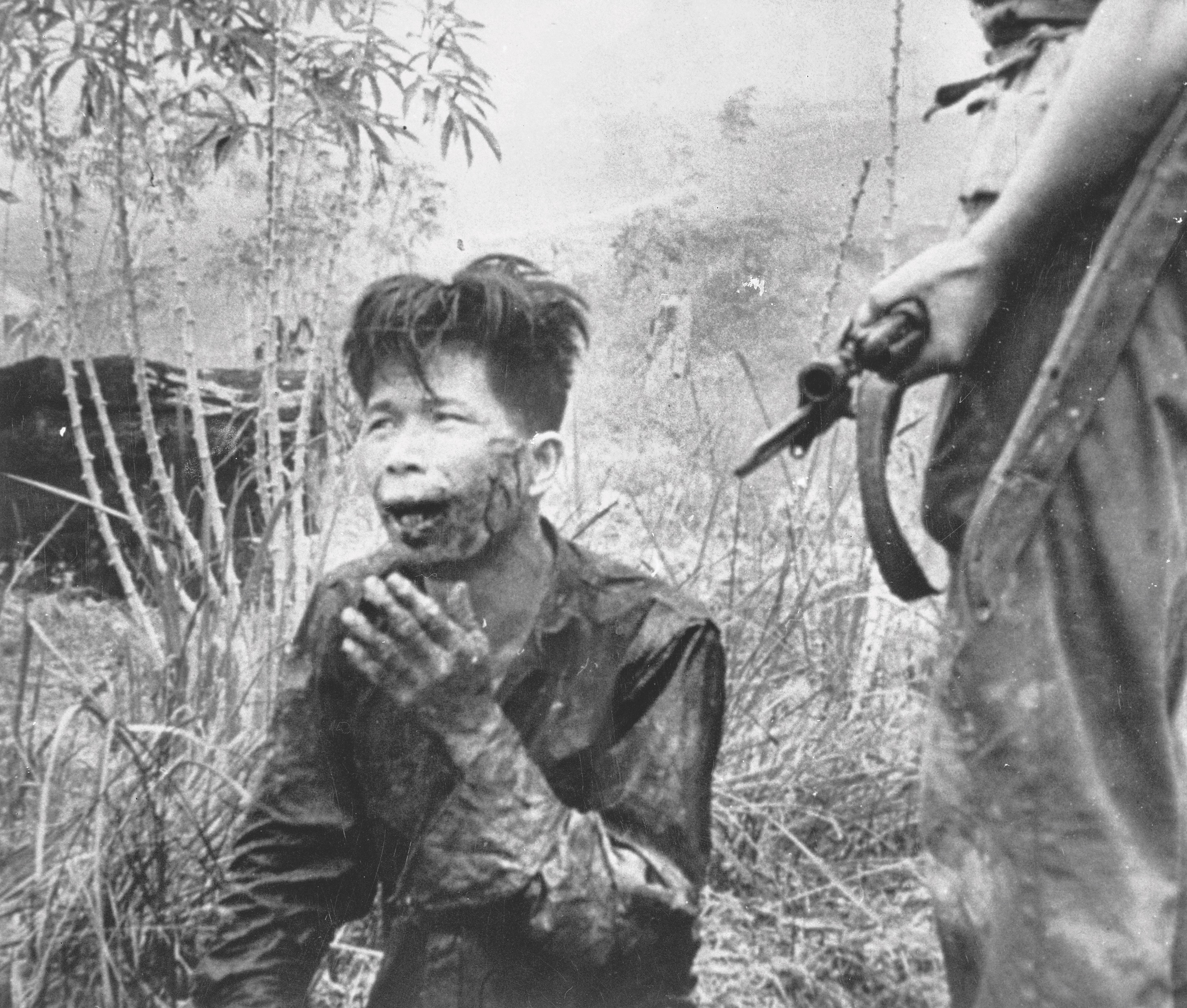
A wounded suspected MNLA supporter being held and questioned after his capture in 1952

The Briggs Plan also included the forced relocation of some one million rural civilians into concentration camps, referred to as "new villages". These concentration camps were surrounded by barbed wire, police posts, and floodlit areas, all designed to stop the inmates from contacting and supplying MNLA guerrillas in the jungles, segregating the communists from their civilian supporters.

In 1948, the British had 13 infantry battalions in Malaya, including seven partly formed Gurkha battalions, three British battalions, two battalions of the Royal Malay Regiment and a Royal Artillery Regiment being used as infantry.

The Permanent Secretary of Defence for Malaya, Sir Robert Grainger Ker Thompson, had served in the Chindits in Burma during World War II. Thompson's in-depth experience of jungle warfare proved invaluable during this period as he was able to build effective civil-military relations and was one of the chief architects of the counter-insurgency plan in Malaya.

In 1951, the British High Commissioner in Malaya, Sir Henry Gurney, was killed near Fraser's Hill during an MNLA ambush. General Gerald Templer was chosen to become the new High Commissioner in January 1952. During Templer's two-year command, "two-thirds of the guerrillas were wiped out and lost over half their strength, the incident rate fell from 500 to less than 100 per month and the civilian and security force casualties from 200 to less than 40." Orthodox historiography suggests that Templer changed the situation in the Emergency and his actions and policies were a major part of British success during his period in command. Revisionist historians have challenged this view and frequently support the ideas of Victor Purcell, a Sinologist who as early as 1954 claimed that Templer merely continued policies begun by his predecessors.

==== Control of anti-guerrilla operations ====
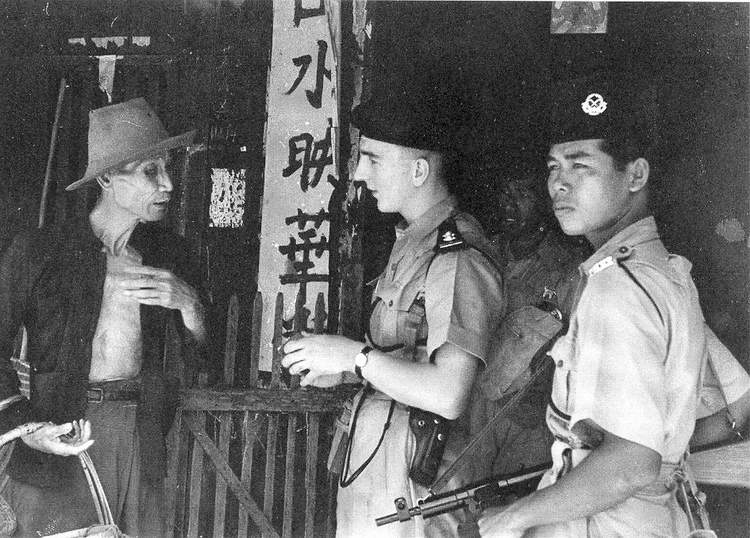
Police officers question a civilian during the Malayan Emergency.

At all levels of the Malayan government (national, state, and district levels), the military and civil authority was assumed by a committee of military, police and civilian administration officials. This allowed intelligence from all sources to be rapidly evaluated and disseminated and also allowed all anti-guerrilla measures to be co-ordinated.

Each of the Malay states had a State War Executive Committee which included the State Chief Minister as chairman, the Chief Police Officer, the senior military commander, state home guard officer, state financial officer, state information officer, executive secretary, and up to six selected community leaders. The Police, Military, and Home Guard representatives and the Secretary formed the operations sub-committee responsible for the day-to-day direction of emergency operations. The operations subcommittees as a whole made joint decisions.

===== Agent Orange =====
During the Malayan Emergency, Britain became the first nation in history to make use of herbicides and defoliants as a military weapon. It was used to destroy bushes, food crops, and trees to deprive the guerrillas of both food and cover, playing a role in Britain's food denial campaign during the early 1950s. A variety of herbicides were used to clear lines of communication and destroy food crops as part of this strategy. One of the herbicides, was a 50:50 mixture of butyl esters of 2,4,5-T and 2,4-D with the brand name Trioxone. This mixture was virtually identical to the later Agent Orange, though Trioxone likely had a heavier contamination of the health-damaging dioxin impurity.

In 1952, Trioxone and mixtures of the aforementioned herbicides, were sprayed along a number of key roads. From June to October 1952, 510 hectares (1,250 acres) of roadside vegetation at possible ambush points were sprayed with defoliant, described as a policy of "national importance". The experts advised that the use of herbicides and defoliants for clearing the roadside could be effectively replaced by removing vegetation by hand and the spraying was stopped. However, after that strategy failed, the use of herbicides and defoliants in effort to fight the guerrillas was restarted under the command of Gerald Templer in February 1953 as a means of destroying food crops grown by communist forces in jungle clearings. Helicopters and fixed-wing aircraft despatched sodium trichloroacetate and Trioxone, along with pellets of chlorophenyl N,N-dimethyl-1-naphthylamine onto crops such as sweet potatoes and maize. Many Commonwealth personnel who handled and/or used Trioxone during the conflict suffered from serious exposure to dioxin and Trioxone. An estimated 10,000 civilians and guerrilla in Malaya also suffered from the effects of the defoliant, though many historians believe it to be higher, since Trioxone was used on a large scale in the Malayan conflict and, unlike the US, the British government had suppressed information regarding its use to avoid negative global public opinion. The prolonged absence of vegetation caused by defoliation also resulted in major soil erosion.

Following the end of the Malayan Emergency, US Secretary of State Dean Rusk advised US President John F. Kennedy that the precedent of using herbicide in warfare had been established by the British through their use of aircraft to spray herbicide and thus destroy enemy crops and thin the thick jungle of northern Malaya.

==== Nature of warfare ====
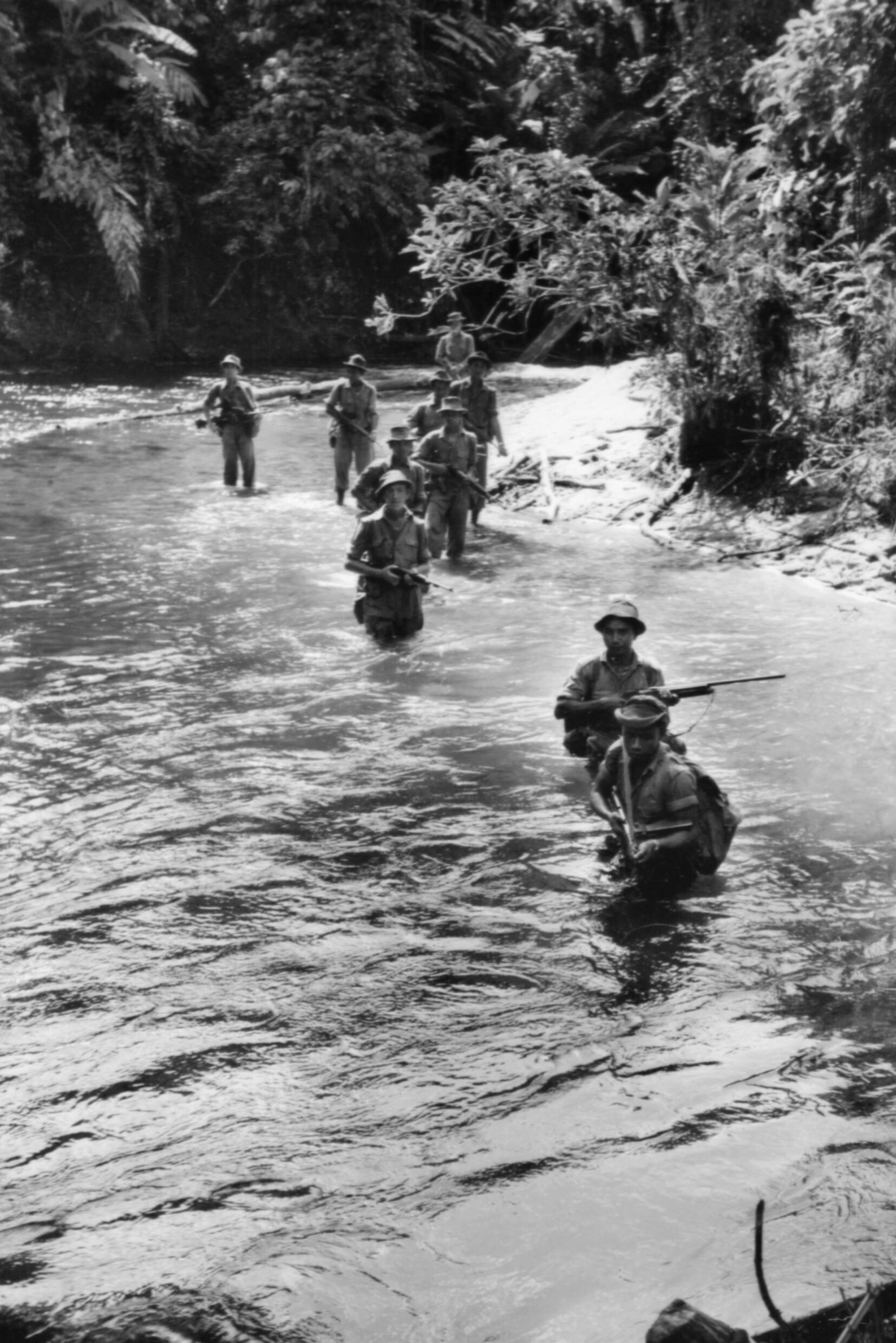
Malayan Police conducting a patrol around the Temenggor, 1953

The British Army soon realised that clumsy sweeps by large formations were unproductive. Instead, platoons or sections carried out patrols and laid ambushes, based on intelligence from various sources, including informers, surrendered MNLA personnel, aerial reconnaissance and other forms of intelligence. An operation named "Nassau", carried out in the Kuala Langat swamp is described in The Guerrilla – and how to Fight Him: (Note: Fleet Marine Force Reference Publication (FMFRP) 12-25,'The Guerrilla - And How To Fight Him')

On 7 July, two additional companies were assigned to the area; patrolling and harassing fires were intensified. Three terrorists surrendered and one of them led a platoon patrol to the terrorist leader's camp. The patrol attacked the camp, killing four, including the leader. Other patrols accounted for four more; by the end of July, twenty-three terrorists remained in the swamp with no food or communications with the outside world. This was the nature of operations: 60,000 artillery shells, 30,000 rounds of mortar ammunition, and 2,000 aircraft bombs for 35 terrorists killed or captured. Each one represented 1,500 man-days of patrolling or waiting in ambushes. "Nassau" was considered a success for the end of the emergency was one step nearer.

MNLA guerrillas had numerous advantages over Commonwealth forces since they lived in closer proximity to villagers and sometimes had relatives or close friends in the village. British forces faced a dual threat, being the MNLA guerrillas and the silent network in villages who supported them. British troops often described the terror of jungle patrols. In addition to watching out for MNLA guerrillas, they had to navigate difficult terrain and avoid dangerous animals and insects. Many patrols would stay in the jungle for days, even weeks, without encountering the MNLA guerrillas. That strategy led to the infamous Batang Kali massacre in which 24 unarmed villagers were executed by British troops.

Royal Air Force activities, grouped under "Operation Firedog" included ground attacks in support of troops and the transport of supplies. The RAF used a wide mixture of aircraft to attack MNLA positions: from the new Avro Lincoln heavy bomber to Short Sunderland flying boats. Jets were used in the conflict when de Havilland Vampires replaced Spitfires of No. 60 Squadron RAF in 1950 and were used for ground attack. Jet bombers came with the English Electric Canberra in 1955. The Casualty Evacuation Flight was formed in early 1953 to bring the wounded out of the jungles; it used early helicopters such as the Westland Dragonfly, landing in small clearings. The RAF progressed to using Westland Whirlwind helicopters to deploy troops in the jungle.

The MNLA was vastly outnumbered by the British forces and their Commonwealth and colonial allies in terms of regular full-time soldiers. Siding with the British occupation were a maximum of 40,000 British and other Commonwealth troops, 250,000 Home Guard members, and 66,000 police agents. Supporting the communists were 7,000+ communist guerrillas (1951 peak), an estimated 1,000,000 sympathisers, and an unknown number of civilian Min Yuen supporters and Orang Asli sympathisers.

==== Psychological warfare ====
British officials set up a Chinese newspaper and distributed leaflets to villages to distribute the government's messages and persuade insurgents to surrender. Radio broadcasts were also used to disseminate government propaganda.

=== Commonwealth contribution ===
Commonwealth forces from Africa and the Pacific fought on the side of the British backed Federation of Malaya during the Malayan Emergency. These forces included troops from Australia, New Zealand, Fiji, Kenya, Nyasaland, Northern and Southern Rhodesia.

==== Australia and Pacific Commonwealth forces ====
Australian ground forces first joined the Malayan Emergency in 1955 with the deployment of the 2nd Battalion, Royal Australian Regiment (2 RAR). The 2 RAR was later replaced by 3 RAR, which in turn was replaced by 1 RAR. The Royal Australian Air Force contributed No. 1 Squadron (Avro Lincoln bombers) and No. 38 Squadron (C-47 transports). In 1955, the RAAF extended Butterworth air base, from which Canberra bombers of No. 2 Squadron (replacing No. 1 Squadron) and CAC Sabres of No. 78 Wing carried out ground attack missions against the guerrillas. The Royal Australian Navy destroyers Warramunga and Arunta joined the force in June 1955. Between 1956 and 1960, the aircraft carriers Melbourne and Sydney and destroyers Anzac, Quadrant, Queenborough, Quiberon, Quickmatch, Tobruk, Vampire, Vendetta and Voyager were attached to the Commonwealth Strategic Reserve forces for three to nine months at a time. Several of the destroyers fired on communist positions in Johor.

New Zealand's first contribution came in 1949, when Douglas C-47 Dakotas of RNZAF No. 41 Squadron were attached to the Royal Air Force's Far East Air Force. New Zealand became more directly involved in the conflict in 1955; from May, RNZAF de Havilland Vampires and Venoms began to fly strike missions. In November 1955 133 soldiers of what was to become the Special Air Service of New Zealand arrived from Singapore, for training in-country with the British SAS, beginning operations by April 1956. The Royal New Zealand Air Force continued to carry out strike missions with Venoms of No. 14 Squadron and later No. 75 Squadron English Electric Canberras bombers, as well as supply-dropping operations in support of anti-guerrilla forces, using the Bristol Freighter. A total of 1,300 New Zealanders were stationed in Malaya between 1948 and 1964, and fifteen lost their lives. Approximately 1,600 Fijian troops were involved in the Malayan Emergency from 1952 to 1956. The experience was captured in the documentary, Back to Batu Pahat.

==== African Commonwealth forces ====
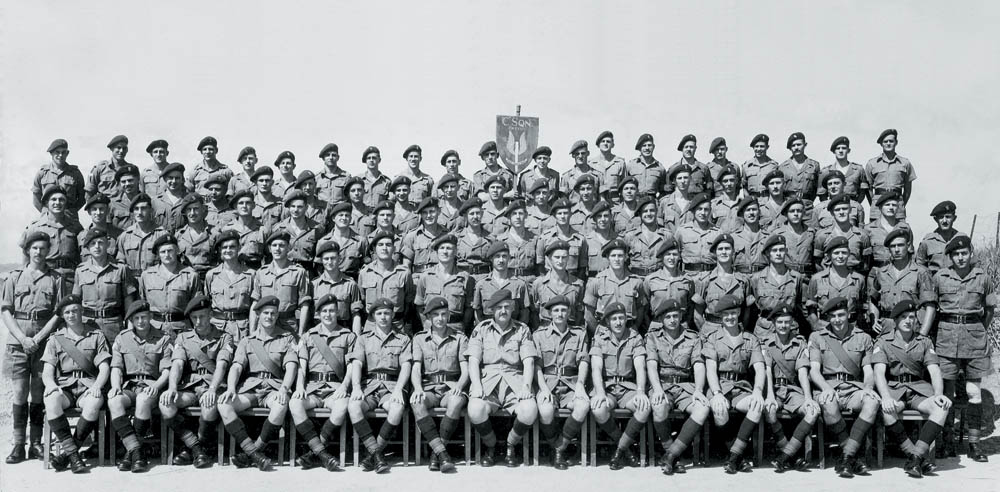
"C" Squadron, the all-Southern Rhodesian unit of the Special Air Service (SAS), in Malaya in 1953

Southern Rhodesia and its successor, the Federation of Rhodesia and Nyasaland, contributed two units to Malaya. Between 1951 and 1953, white Southern Rhodesian volunteers formed "C" Squadron of the Special Air Service. The Rhodesian African Rifles, comprising black soldiers and warrant officers led by white officers, were stationed in Johor between 1956 and 1958. The King's African Rifles from Nyasaland, Northern Rhodesia and Kenya were also deployed to Malaya.

==== Iban mercenaries ====
The British Empire hired thousands of mercenaries hailing from the Iban people (a subgroup of the Dayak people) of Borneo to fight against the Malayan National Liberation Army. During their service they were widely praised for their jungle and bushcraft skills, though their military effectiveness and behaviour during the war has been brought into question.

Their deployment received a large amount of both positive and negative attention in British media. They were also responsible for a number of atrocities, most notably the decapitation and scalping of suspected MNLA guerrillas. Photographs of this practice were leaked in 1952, sparking the British Malayan headhunting scandal. In 1953 most Ibans in Malaya joined the reformed Sarawak Rangers, transitioning them from mercenaries into regular soldiers.

According to a former member of the Sarawak Rangers, Ibans served with at least 42 separate battalions in the Malayan Emergency belonging to either British or Commonwealth militaries.

Iban mercenaries were first deployed to British Malaya by the British Empire to fight in the Malayan Emergency on the 8 August where they served Ferret Force. Many were motivated to fight with the hope that they could collect the heads and scalps of their enemies.

Their deployment was supported by the British politician Arthur Creech Jones, then serving as the Secretary of State for the Colonies who agreed to deploy Ibans to the Malayan Emergency for three months. Amid rumours that the Iban mercenaries they deployed were practiced headhunters, all Ibans serving with the British were removed from British Malaya and quietly redeployed in 1949 and served for the entirety of the war until its end in 1960.

Some historians have argued that the British military's use of Ibans stemmed from stereotypes that "primitive" people enjoyed a closer relationship with nature than Europeans. Others have argued that the British army's deployment and treatment of the Ibans during the Malayan Emergency reflected the British military's history regarding what they perceived as 'martial races'.

The deployment of Iban mercenaries recruited to fight in the Malayan Emergency was a widely publicised topic in the British press. Many newspapers articles contained titles referring to the Iban cultural practice of headhunting and contained articles portraying Ibans as violent and primitive while being friendly towards white Europeans. While many newspaper articles incorrectly argued that Ibans deployed to Malaya were no longer headhunters, others put forward arguments that Ibans in Malaya should be allowed to openly decapitate and scalp members of the MNLA.

The Iban mercenaries deployed to Malaya were widely praised for their jungle bushcraft skills, although some British and Commonwealth officers found that Ibans were outperformed in this role by recruits from Africa and certain parts of the Commonwealth. The behaviour of Iban mercenaries serving in Malaya was also the subject of criticism, as some Iban recruits were found to have looted corpses and others had threatened their commanding officers with weapons. Due to fears of racial tensions with ethnic Malays the Iban mercenaries that Britain deployed to Malaya were denied access to automatic weapons.

There were also communication difficulties, for virtually all the Iban recruits in Malaya were illiterate and most British troops serving alongside them had no prior experience with Asian languages. Some Iban mercenaries refused to go on patrol after receiving bad omens in their dreams. Iban society had no social classes making it difficult for them to adhere to military ranks. Some Royal Marines complained that their Iban allies were inaccurate with firearms, and Ibans were both the victims and perpetrators of an unusual amount of friendly-fire incidents. The first Iban casualty of the war was a man called Jaweng ak Jugah who was shot dead after being mistaken for a "communist terrorist".

At the beginning of the Malayan Emergency, the Ibans serving the British were classified as civilians and were thus awarded British and Commonwealth medals reserved for civilians. In one example, the Iban mercenary Awang anak Raweng, was awarded the George Cross in 1951 after he allegedly repelled an attack of 50 MNLA guerrillas. Another example is Menggong anak Panggit who was awarded the George Medal in 1953.

In 1953, Ibans in Malaya were given their own regiment, the Sarawak Rangers. Many would go on to fight during the Second Malayan Emergency.

=== The October Resolution ===
In 1951, the MNLA implemented the October Resolution. The October Resolution involved a change of tactics by the MNLA by reducing attacks on economic targets and civilian collaborators, redirecting their efforts towards political organisation and subversion, and bolstering the supply network from the Min Yuen as well as jungle farming and was a response to the Briggs Plan.

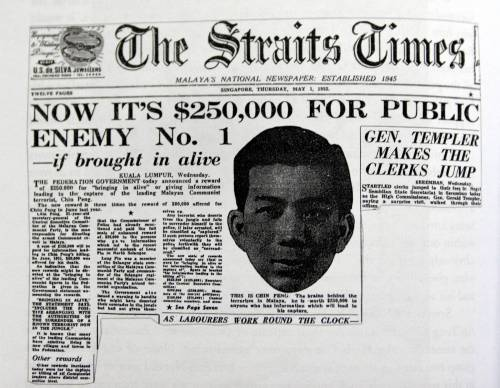
Headline on page 1 of The Straits Times of 1952. Chin Peng: Public Enemy No.1

=== Amnesty declaration ===
On 8 September 1955, the Government of the Federation of Malaya issued a declaration of amnesty to the communists. The Government of Singapore issued an identical offer at the same time. Tunku Abdul Rahman, as Chief Minister, offered amnesty but rejected negotiations with the MNLA. The amnesty read that:

- Those of you who come in and surrender will not be prosecuted for any offence connected with the Emergency, which you have committed under Communist direction, either before this date or in ignorance of this declaration.
- You may surrender now and to whom you like including to members of the public.
- There will be no general "ceasefire" but the security forces will be on alert to help those who wish to accept this offer and for this purpose local "ceasefire" will be arranged.
- The Government will conduct investigations on those who surrender. Those who show that they are genuinely intent to be loyal to the Government of Malaya and to give up their Communist activities will be helped to regain their normal position in society and be reunited with their families. As regards the remainder, restrictions will have to be placed on their liberty but if any of them wish to go to China, their request will be given due consideration.

Following this amnesty declaration, an intensive publicity campaign was launched by the government. Alliance ministers in the Federal Government travelled extensively across Malaya exhorting civilians to call upon communist forces to surrender their weapons and accept the amnesty. Despite the campaign, few Communist guerrillas chose to surrender. Some political activists criticised the amnesty for being too restrictive and for being a rewording of earlier well established surrender offers. These critics advocated for direct negotiations with the communist guerrillas of the MNLA and MCP to work on a peace settlement. Leading officials of the Labour Party had, as part of the settlement, not excluded the possibility of recognition of the MCP as a political organisation. Within the Alliance itself, influential elements in both the MCA and UMNO were endeavouring to persuade the Chief Minister, Tunku Abdul Rahman, to hold negotiations with the MCP.

==== Baling Talks and their consequences ====
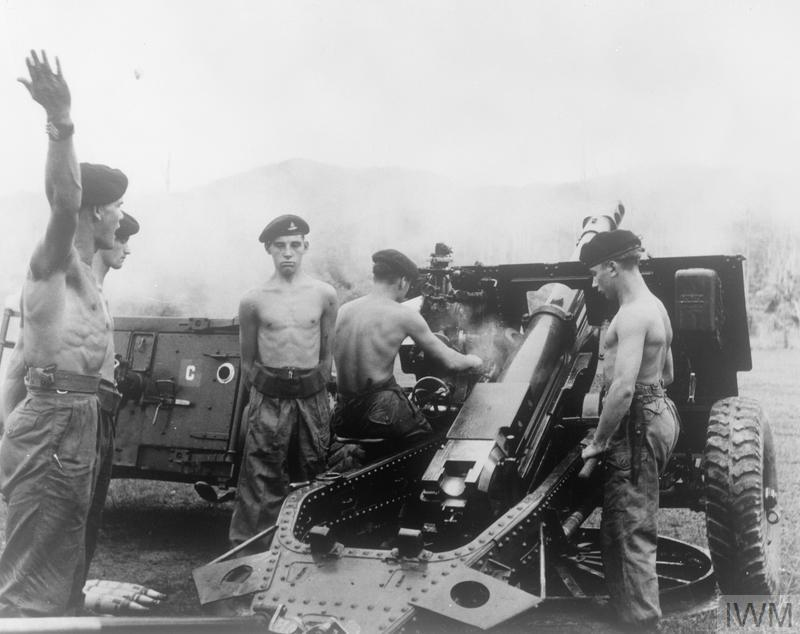
British artillery firing on MNLA guerrillas in the Malayan jungle, 1955

In 1955 Chin Peng indicated that he would be willing to meet with British officials alongside senior Malayan politicians. The result of this was the Baling Talks, a meeting which took place between communist and Commonwealth forces to debate a peace treaty. The Baling Talks took place inside an English School in Baling on 28 December 1955. The MCP and MNLA was represented by Chin Peng, Rashid Maidin, and Chen Tien. The Commonwealth forces were represented by Tunku Abdul Rahman, Tan Cheng-Lock and David Saul Marshall. Despite the meeting being conducted successfully, the British forces were worried that a peace treaty with the MCP would lead to communist activists regaining influence in society. As a result, many of Chin Peng's demands were dismissed.

Following the failure of the talks, Tunku Abdul Rahman withdrew the amnesty offers for MNLA members on 8 February 1956, five months after they had been offered, stating he was unwilling to meet the communists again unless they indicated beforehand their intention to make "a complete surrender".

Following the failure of the Baling Talks, the MCP made various efforts to resume peace negotiations with the Malayan government, all without success. Meanwhile, discussions began in the new Emergency Operations Council to intensify the "People's War" against the guerrillas. In July 1957, a few weeks before independence, the MCP made another attempt at peace talks, suggesting the following conditions for a negotiated peace:

- its members should be given privileges enjoyed by citizens
- a guarantee that political as well as armed members of the MCP would not be punished

The failure of the talks affected MCP policy. The strength of the MNLA and 'Min Yuen' declined to 1830 members in August 1957. Those who remained faced exile, or death in the jungle. However, Tunku Abdul Rahman did not respond to the MCP's proposals. Following the declaration of Malaya's independence in August 1957, the MNLA lost its rationale as a force of colonial liberation.

The last serious resistance from MNLA guerrillas ended with a surrender in the Telok Anson marsh area in 1958. The remaining MNLA forces fled to the Thai border and further east. On 31 July 1960 the Malayan government declared the state of emergency to be over, and Chin Peng left south Thailand for Beijing where he was accommodated by the Chinese authorities in the International Liaison Bureau, where many other Southeast Asian Communist Party leaders were housed.

== Casualties ==
During the conflict, security forces killed 6,710 MNLA guerrillas and captured 1,287, while 2,702 guerrillas surrendered during the conflict, and approximately 500 more did so at its conclusion. A total of 226 guerrillas were executed. 1,346 Malayan troops and police were killed during the fighting. 1,443 British personnel died, in what remains the largest loss of life among UK armed forces since the Second World War. 2,478 civilians were killed, with another 810 recorded as missing.

== Atrocities ==
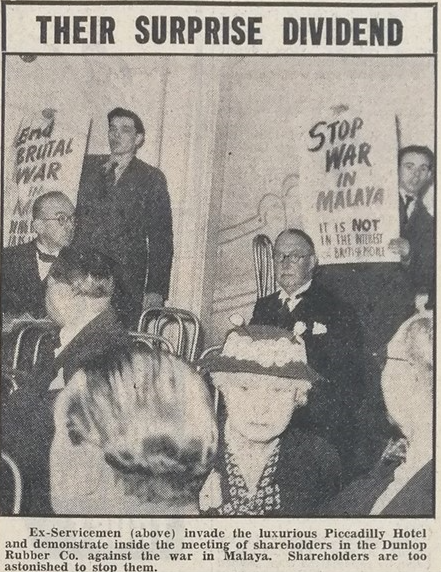
British ex-soldiers mount a protest at Dunlop Rubber's annual shareholder meeting against Britain's involvement in the Malayan Emergency

=== Commonwealth ===
==== Torture ====
During the Malayan conflict, in operations to find MNLA guerrillas British troops detained and tortured villagers who were suspected of aiding the MNLA. British forces routinely beat up Chinese squatters when they refused, or possibly were unable, to give information about the MNLA. The Scotsman newspaper lauded these tactics as a good practice since "simple-minded peasants are told and come to believe that the communist leaders are invulnerable". Some civilians and detainees were also shot, either because they attempted to flee from and potentially aid the MNLA or simply because they refused to give intelligence to British forces.

Widespread use of arbitrary detention, punitive actions against villages, and use of torture by the police, "created animosity" between Chinese squatters and British forces in Malaya which was counterproductive to gathering good intelligence.

==== Batang Kali Massacre ====
During the Batang Kali massacre, 24 unarmed civilians were executed by the Scots Guards near a rubber plantation at Sungai Rimoh near Batang Kali in Selangor in December 1948. All the victims were male, ranging in age from young teenage boys to elderly men. Many of the victims' bodies were found to have been mutilated and their village of Batang Kali was burned to the ground. No weapons were found when the village was searched. The only survivor of the massacre was a man named Chong Hong who was in his 20s at the time. He fainted and was presumed dead. Soon afterwards the British colonial government staged a coverup of British military abuses which served to obfuscate the exact details of the massacre.

The massacre later became the focus of decades of legal battles between the UK government and the families of the civilians executed by British troops. According to Christi Silver, Batang Kali was notable in that it was the only incident of mass killings by Commonwealth forces during the war, which Silver attributes to the unique subculture of the Scots Guards and poor enforcement of discipline by junior officers.

==== Concentration camps ====
As part of the Briggs Plan devised by British General Sir Harold Briggs, one million civilians (roughly ten percent of Malaya's population) were forced from their homes by British forces. Tens of thousands of homes were destroyed, and many people were imprisoned in British concentration camps referred to with the euphemism "new villages". During the Malayan Emergency, 600 of these concentration camps were created. The policy aimed to inflict collective punishment on villages where people were thought to support communism, and also to isolate civilians from guerrilla activity. Many of the forced evictions involved the destruction of existing settlements which went beyond the justification of military necessity. This practice is prohibited by Article 17 (1) of Additional Protocol II to the Geneva Conventions, which forbid civilian internment unless rendered absolutely necessary by military operations.

==== Collective punishment ====
A key British war measure was inflicting collective punishments on villages whose population were deemed to be aiding MNLA guerrillas. At Tanjong Malim in March 1952, Templer imposed a twenty-two-hour house curfew, banned everyone from leaving the village, closed the schools, stopped bus services, and reduced the rice rations for 20,000 people. The last measure prompted the London School of Hygiene and Tropical Medicine to write to the Colonial Office to note that the "chronically undernourished Malayan" might not be able to survive as a result. "This measure is bound to result in an increase, not only of sickness but also of deaths, particularly amongst the mothers and very young children". Some people were fined for leaving their homes to use external latrines. In another collective punishment, at Sengei Pelek the following month, measures included a house curfew, a reduction of 40 percent in the rice ration and the construction of a chain-link fence 22 yards outside the existing barbed wire fence around the town. Officials explained that the measures were being imposed upon the 4,000 villagers "for their continually supplying food" to the MNLA and "because they did not give information to the authorities".

==== Deportations ====
Over the course of the war, some 30,000 mostly ethnic Chinese were deported by the British authorities to mainland China. This would have been a war crime under Article 17 (2) of Additional Protocol II to the Geneva Conventions, which states: "Civilians shall not be compelled to leave their own territory for reasons connected with the conflict."

==== Public display of corpses ====
During the Emergency it was common practice for British forces and their allies to publicly display the corpses of suspected communists and anti-colonial guerrillas. This was often done in the centers of towns and villages. Oftentimes British and Commonwealth troops would round up local children and forced them to look at the corpses, monitoring their emotional reaction for clues on whether they knew the dead. Many of the corpses publicly displayed by British forces belonged to guerrillas who had previously been allies of Britain during WWII.

A notable victim of these public corpse displays was MNLA guerrilla leader Liew Kon Kim, whose corpse was publicly displayed in locations around British Malaya. At least two instances of public corpse displays by British forces in Malaya gained notable media attention in Britain, and were later dubbed "The Telok Anson Tragedy" and "The Kulim Tragedy".

==== Headhunting and scalping ====
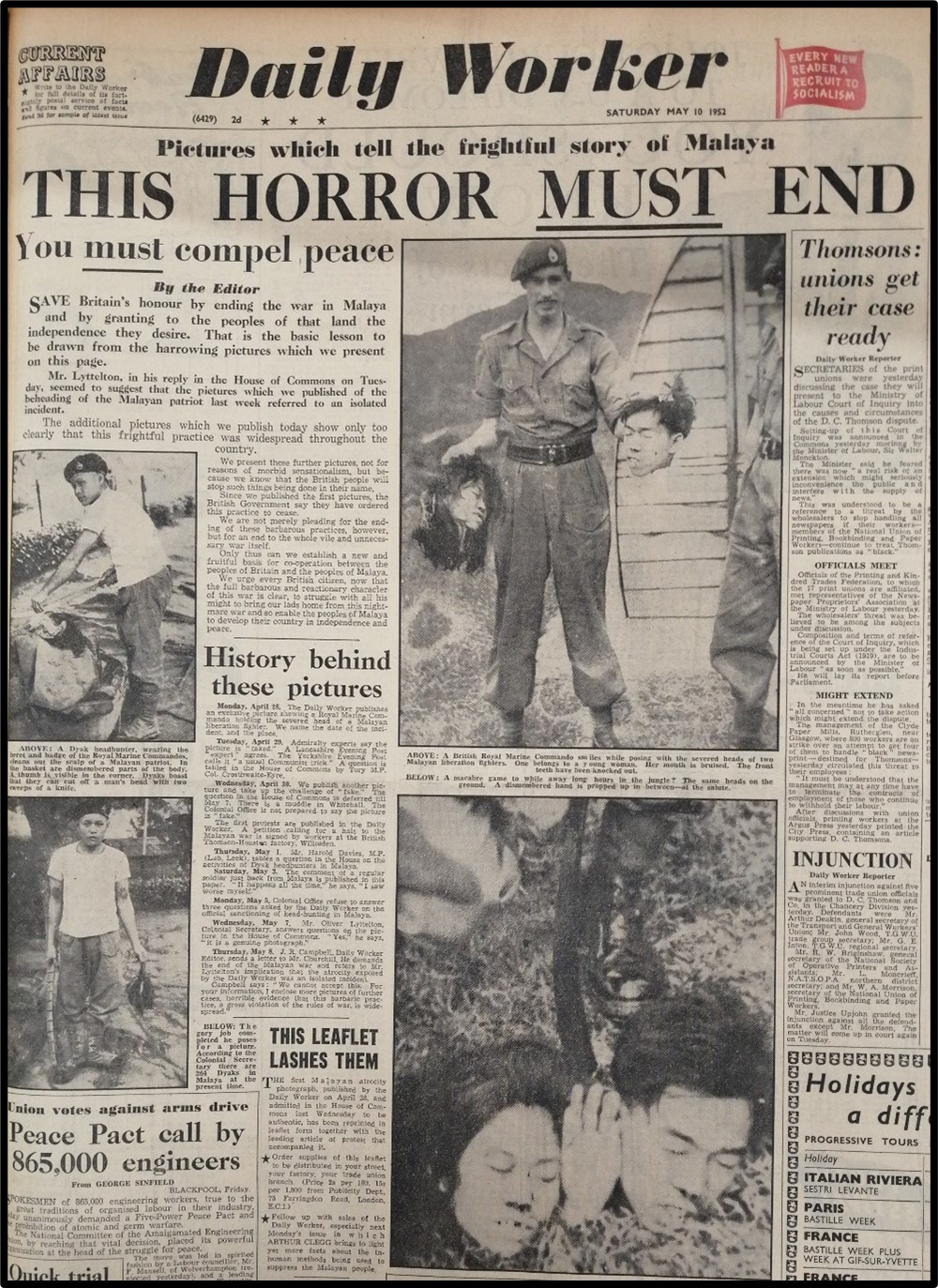
A Daily Worker article exposing newly uncovered images of British atrocities involving headhunting during the Malayan Emergency

During the war British and Commonwealth forces hired over 1,000 Iban (Dyak) mercenaries from Borneo to act as jungle trackers. With a tradition of headhunting, they decapitated suspected MNLA members; the authorities held that taking the heads was the only means of later identification. Iban headhunters were permitted by British military leaders to keep the scalps of corpses as trophies. After the headhunting had been exposed to the public, the Foreign Office first tried to deny it was in use, before then trying to justify Iban headhunting and conducting damage control in the press. Privately, the Colonial Office noted that "there is no doubt that under international law a similar case in wartime would be a war crime". Skull fragments from a trophy head were later found to have been displayed in a British regimental museum.

===== Headhunting exposed to British public =====
In April 1952, the British communist newspaper the Daily Worker (later known as the Morning Star) published a photograph of British Royal Marines inside a British military base openly posing with severed human heads. By republishing these images the British communists had hoped to turn public opinion against the war. Initially, British government spokespersons belonging to the Admiralty and the Colonial Office claimed the photograph was fake. In response to the accusations that their headhunting photograph was fake, the Daily Worker released another photograph taken in Malaya showing British soldiers posing with a severed head. The Colonial Secretary, Oliver Lyttelton, later confirmed to parliament that the Daily Worker headhunting photographs were indeed genuine. In response to the Daily Worker articles exposing the decapitation of MNLA suspects, the practice was banned by Winston Churchill who feared that such photographs resulting from headhunting would expose the British for their brutality. However, Churchill's order to discontinue the decapitations was widely ignored by Iban trackers who continued to behead suspected guerrillas.

Despite the shocking imagery of the photographs of soldiers posing with severed heads in Malaya, the Daily Worker was the only newspaper to publish them and the photographs were virtually ignored by the mainstream British press.

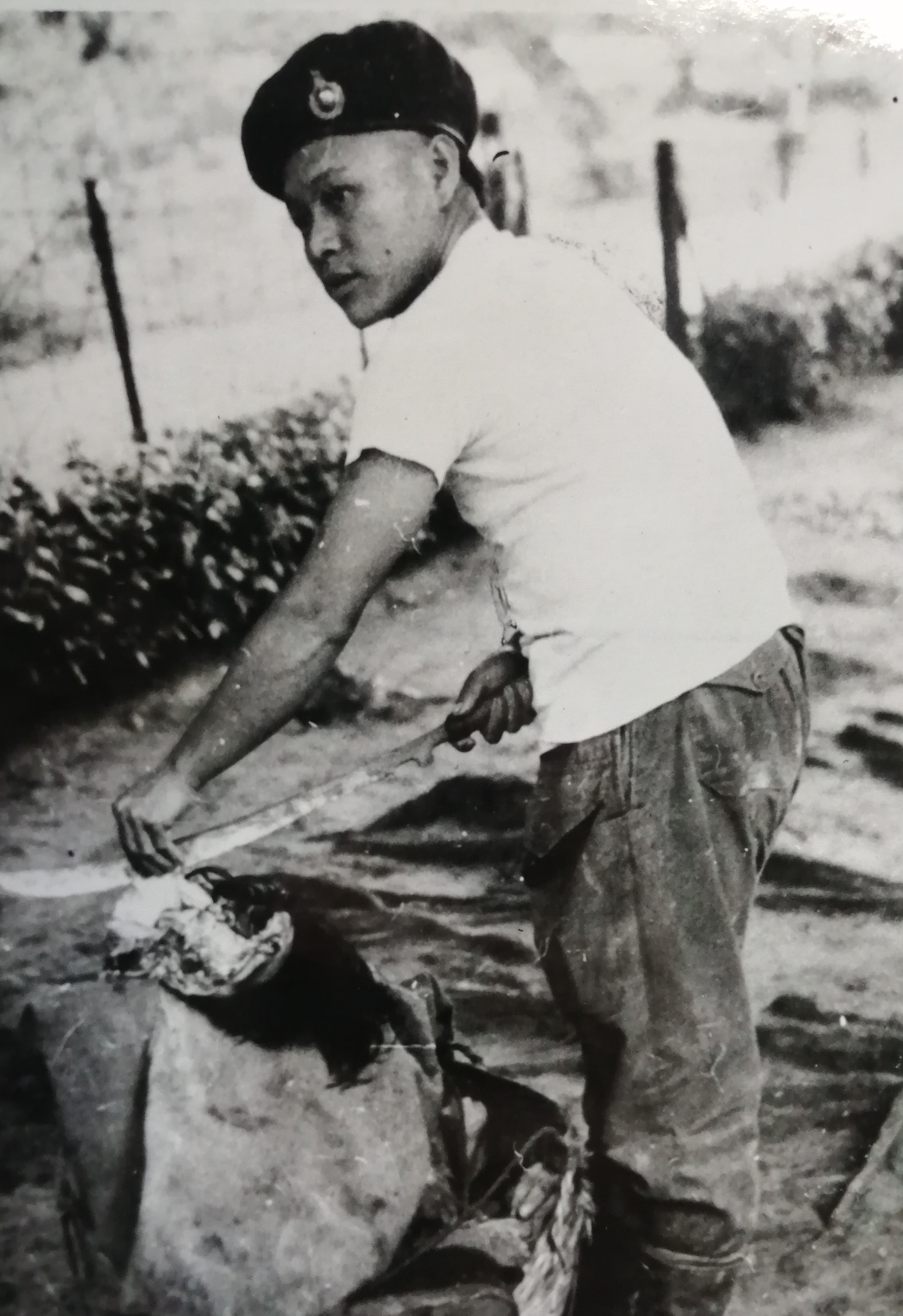
An Iban headhunter wearing a Royal Marine beret prepares a human scalp above a basket of human body parts.

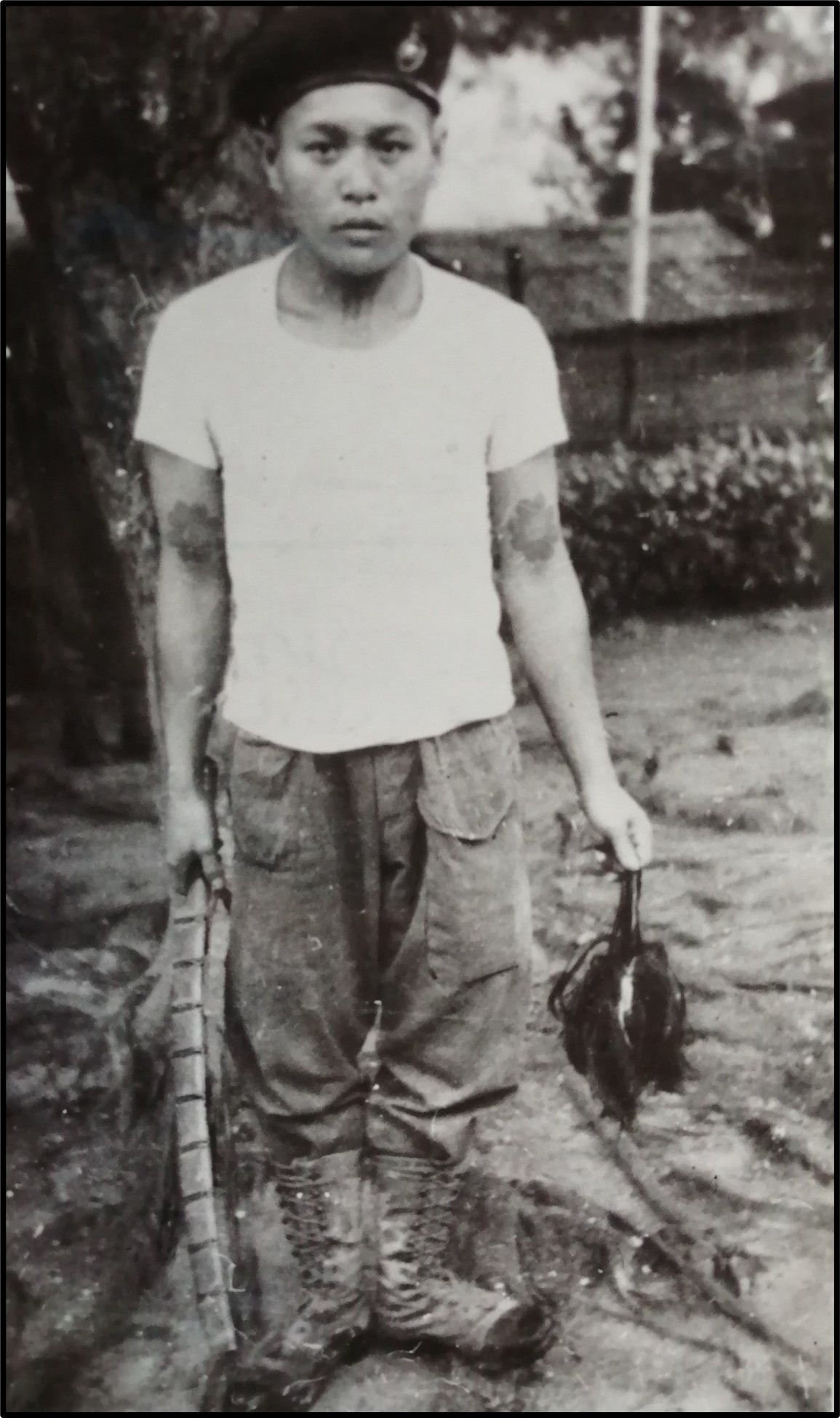
An Iban headhunter posing with a human scalp

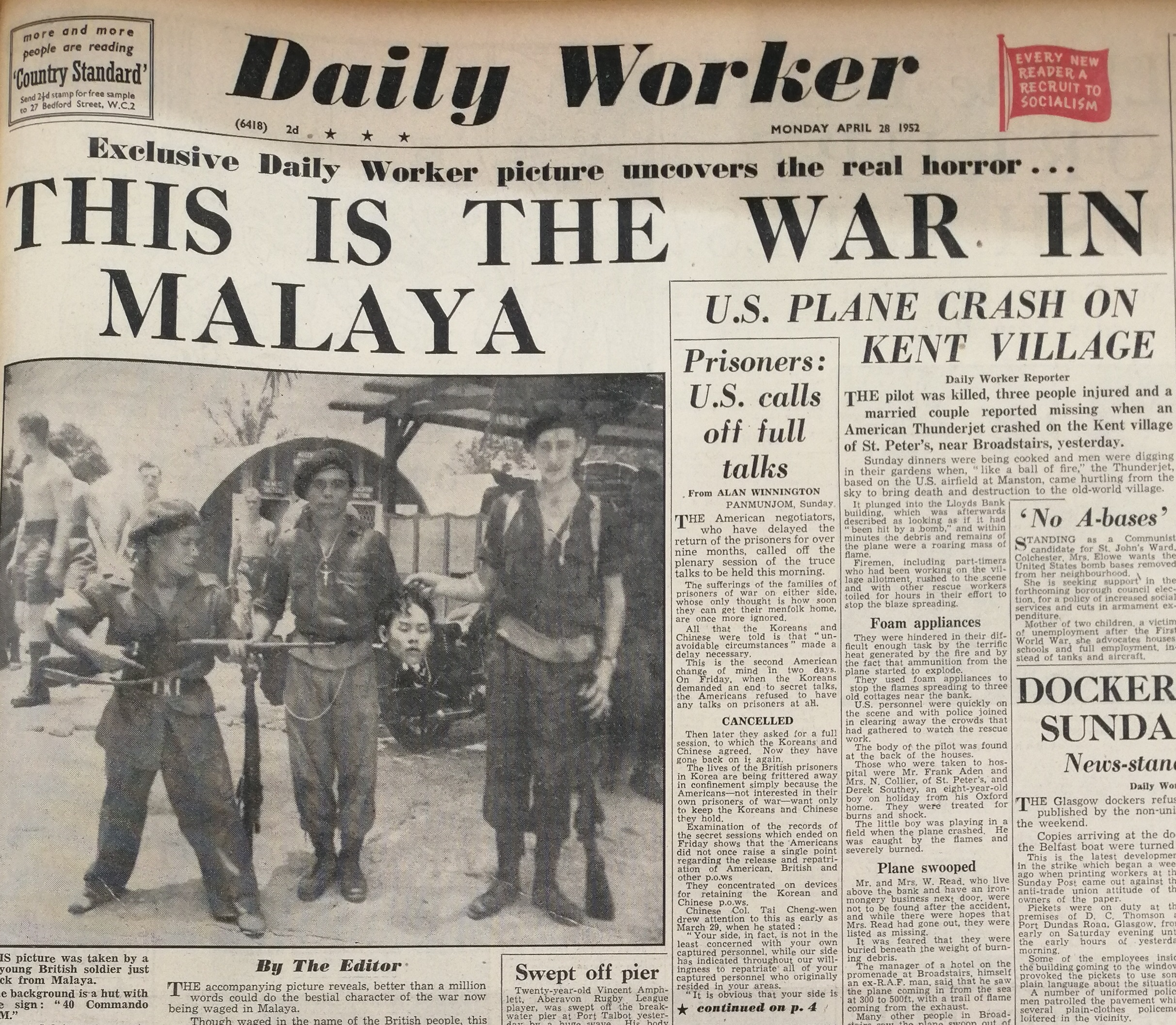
The Daily Worker exposes the practice of headhunting among British troops in Malaya. 28 April 1952.

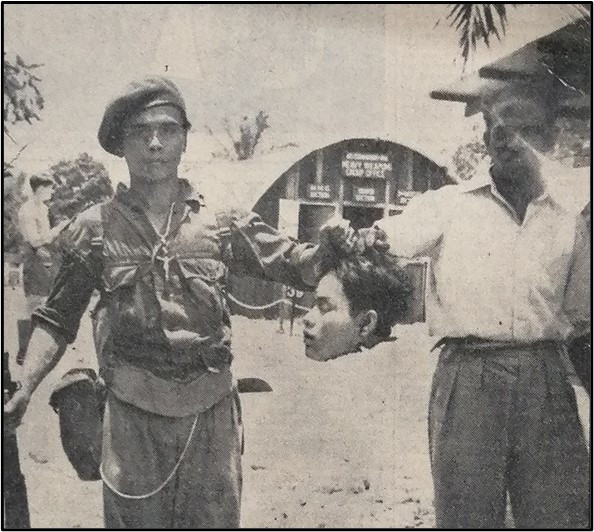
Commonwealth soldiers pose with a severed head inside a British military base in Malaya during the Malayan Emergency

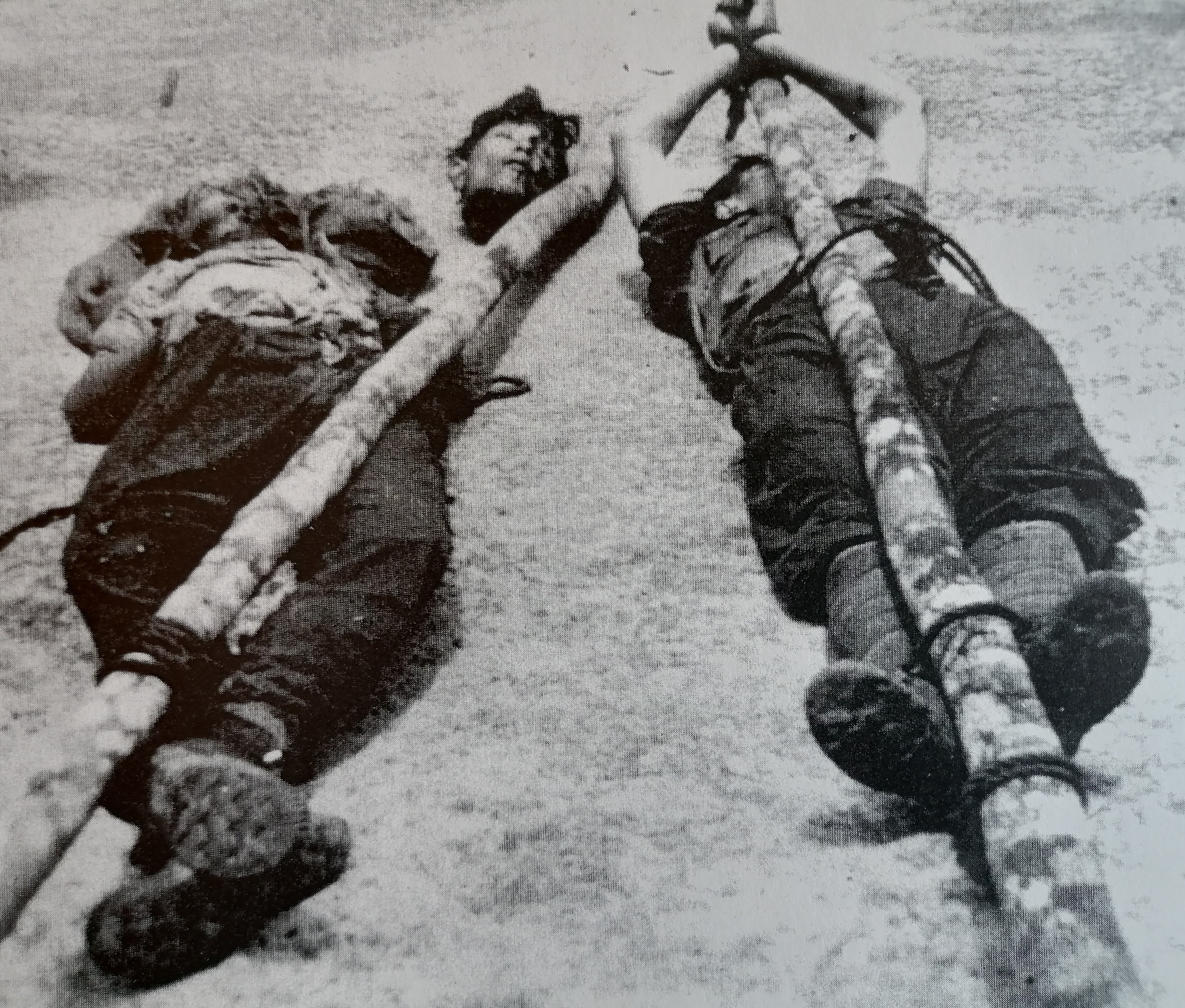
Two corpses and a severed head belonging to guerrillas killed by the Queen's Own Royal West Kent Regiment.

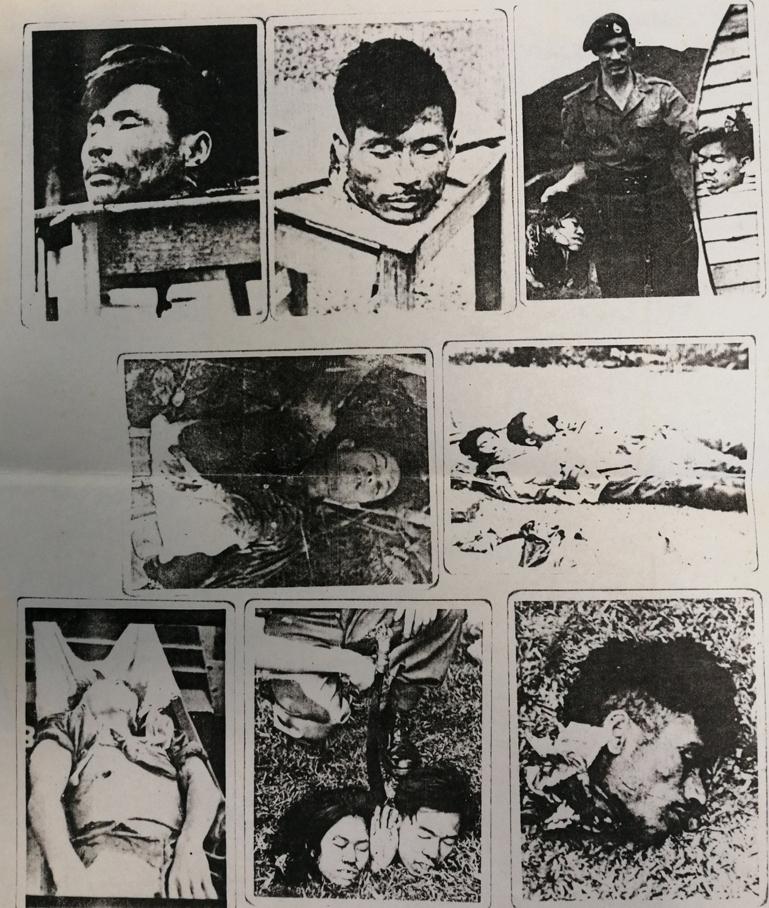
Atrocity photographs (including headhunting) from the archives of the Working Class Movement Library, Manchester.

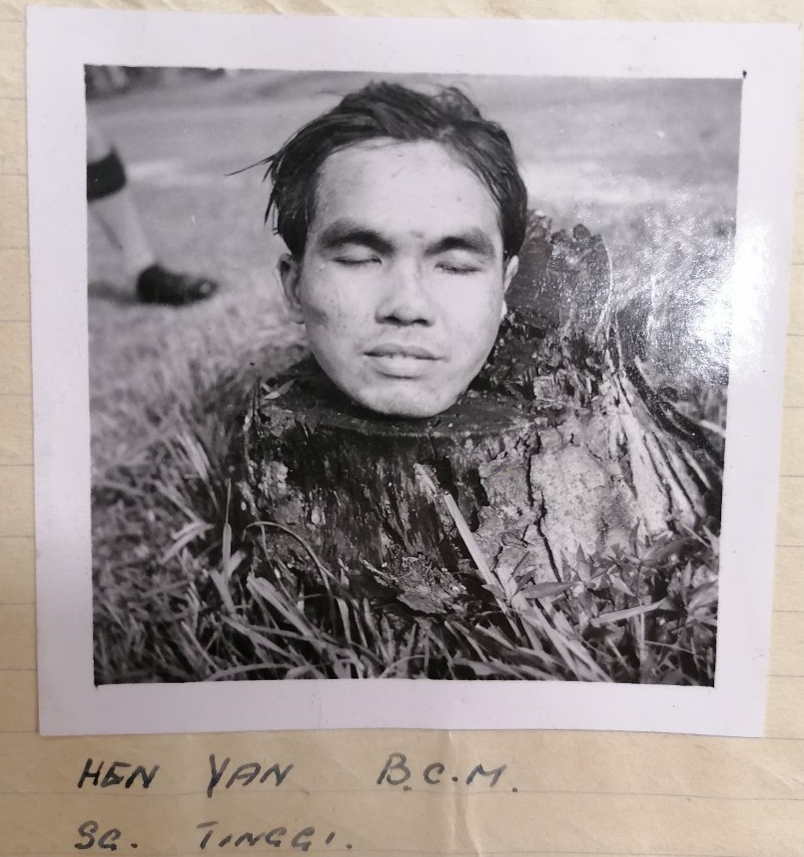
Severed head of MNLA guerrilla commander Hen Yan, killed in 1952 by the Suffolk Regiment.

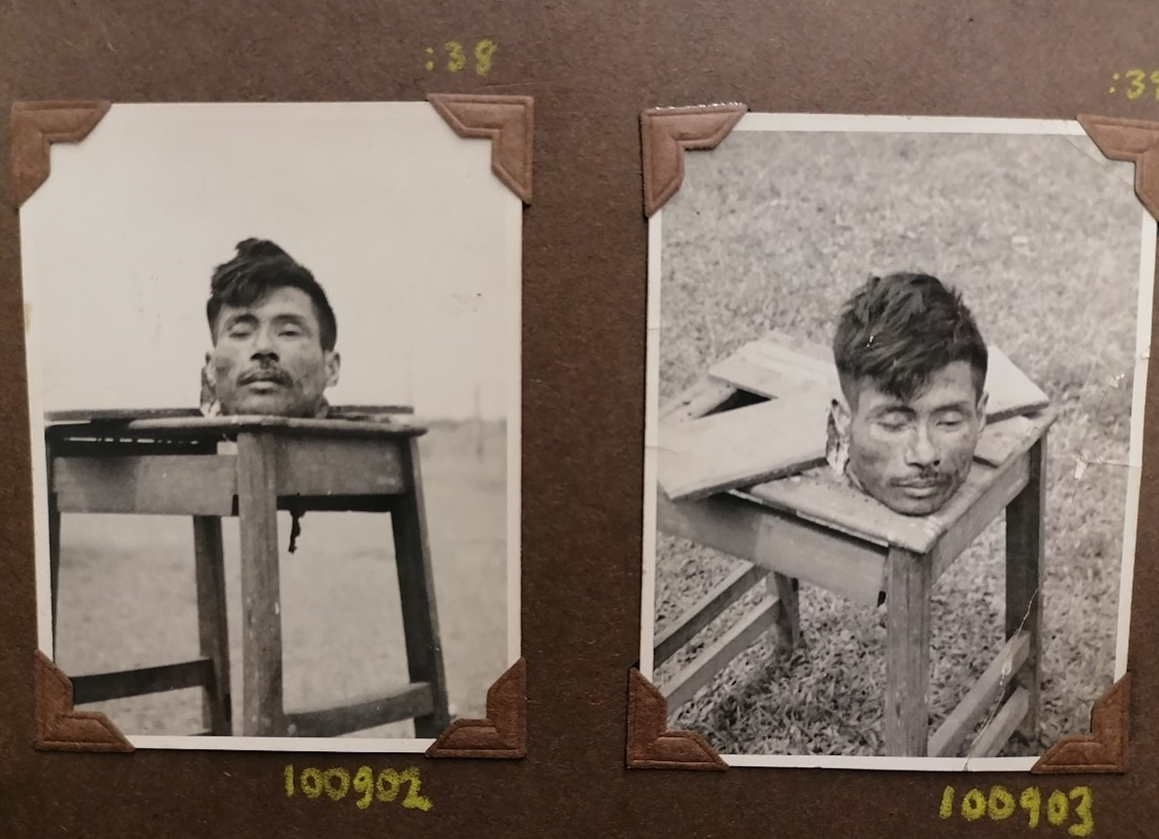
Photographs of severed head of MNLA member held in the archives of the National Army Museum, London.

== Comparisons with Vietnam ==
This war had similarities with the First Indochina War in Vietnam; both the French and the British returned to establish their colonial rule after Japanese occupation, both granted a high degree of autonomy to their own indigenous states (Vietnam on 8 March 1949 and Malaya on 1 January 1948), both had the US help, both had to fight communist anti-colonial rebellions as part of ideological conflicts, the headquarters of the communists in both Vietnam and Malaysia were in the jungle, both pro-colonial native states were granted full independence within the French Union (4 June 1954) or the British Commonwealth (31 August 1957) at the end of the war, and both Vietnam and Malaysia had to continue to fight the communist side after independence.

=== Differences ===
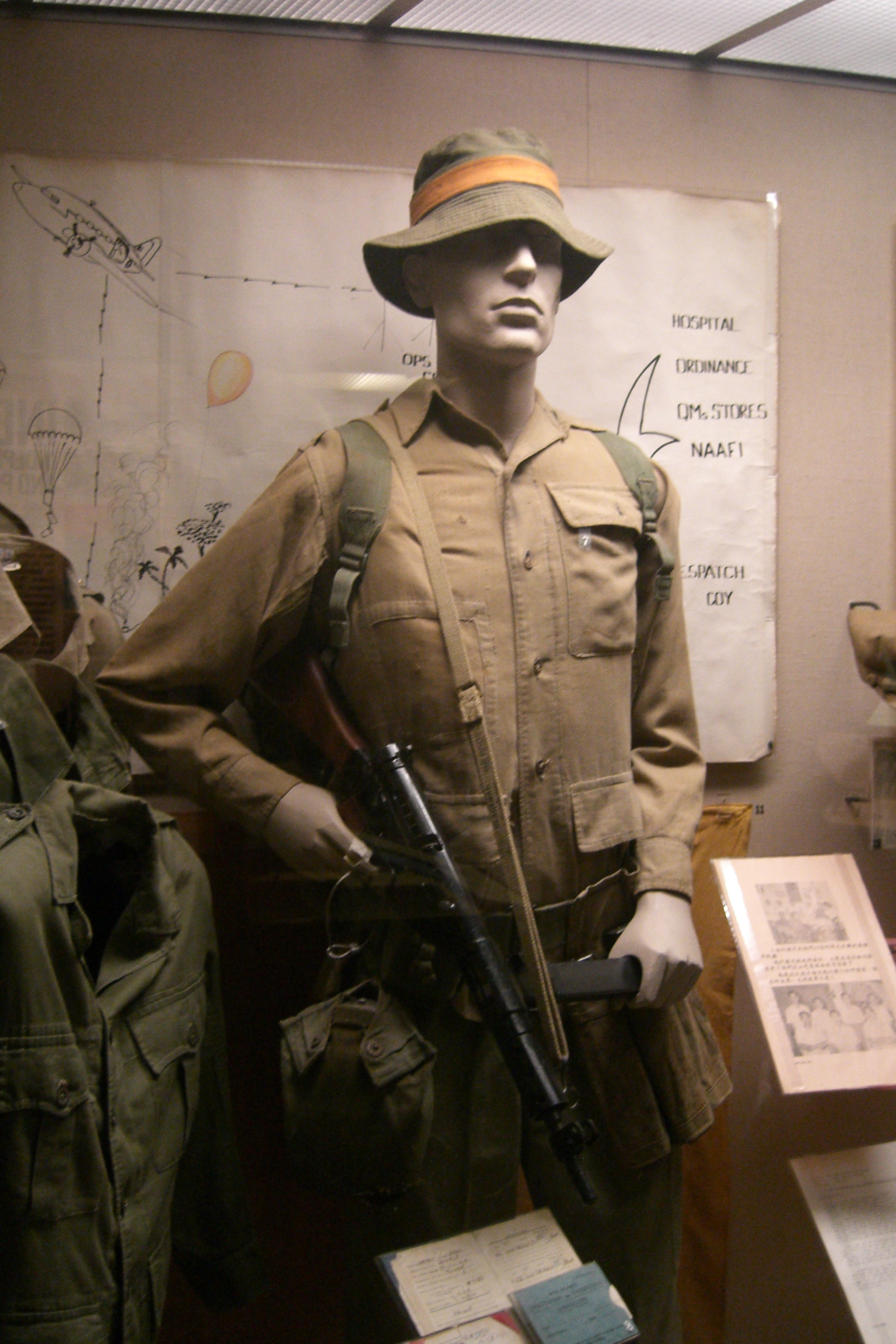
Jungle service dress of the 1st Battalion Somerset Light Infantry used in the emergency

This conflict and the Vietnam War (following the First Indochina War) have often been compared. However, the two conflicts differ in the following ways:

- The MNLA never numbered more than about 8,000 full-time insurgents, but the People's Army of (North) Vietnam fielded a quarter of a million regular troops, in addition to roughly 100,000 National Liberation Front (or Viet Cong) partisans.
- North Korea, Cuba and the People's Republic of China (PRC) provided military hardware, logistical support, personnel and training to North Vietnam, whereas the MNLA received no material support, weapons or training from any foreign government.
- North Vietnam's shared border with its ally China (PRC) allowed for continuous assistance and provided a safe haven for communist forces, but Malaya's only land border is with non-communist Thailand.
- Britain did not approach the Emergency as a conventional conflict and quickly implemented an effective intelligence strategy, led by the Malayan Police Special Branch, and a systematic hearts and minds operation, both of which proved effective against the largely political aims of the guerrilla movement.
- The British military recognised that in a low-intensity war, individual soldiers' skill and endurance were of far greater importance than overwhelming firepower (artillery, air support, etc.). Even though many British soldiers were conscripted National Servicemen, the necessary skills and attitudes were taught at a Jungle Warfare School, which also developed the optimum tactics based on experience gained in the field.
- Vietnam was less ethnically fragmented than Malaya. During the Emergency, most MNLA members were ethnically Chinese and drew support from sections of the Chinese community. However, most of the more numerous indigenous Malays, many of whom were animated by anti-Chinese sentiments, largely remained loyal to the government and enlisted in high numbers into the security services.

=== Similarities ===
The United States in Vietnam were highly influenced by Britain's military strategies during the Malayan Emergency and the two wars shared many similarities. Some examples are listed below.

- Both countries used Agent Orange. Britain pioneered the use of Agent Orange as a weapon of war during the Malayan Emergency. This fact was used by the United States as a justification to use Agent Orange in Vietnam.
- Both the Royal Air Force and the United States Air Force used widespread saturation bombing.
- Both countries frequently used concentration camps. In Malaya, camps referred to with the euphemism "new villages" were built by the British colonial occupation to imprison approximately one million rural peasants. The United States attempted to replicate the camps with their Strategic Hamlet Program. However, the programme was unsuccessful in segregating communist guerrillas from their civilian supporters.
- Both countries made use of incendiary weapons, including flamethrowers and incendiary grenades.
- Both the Malayan and Vietnamese communists recruited women as fighters due to their beliefs in gender equality. Women served as generals in both communist armies, with notable examples being Lee Meng in Malaya and Nguyễn Thị Định in Vietnam.
- Both the Malayan and Vietnamese communists were led by veterans of WWII who had been trained by their future enemies. The British trained and funded the Malayan Peoples' Anti-Japanese Army whose veterans would go onto resist the British colonial occupation, and the United States trained Vietnamese communists to fight against Japan during WWII.

== Legacy ==
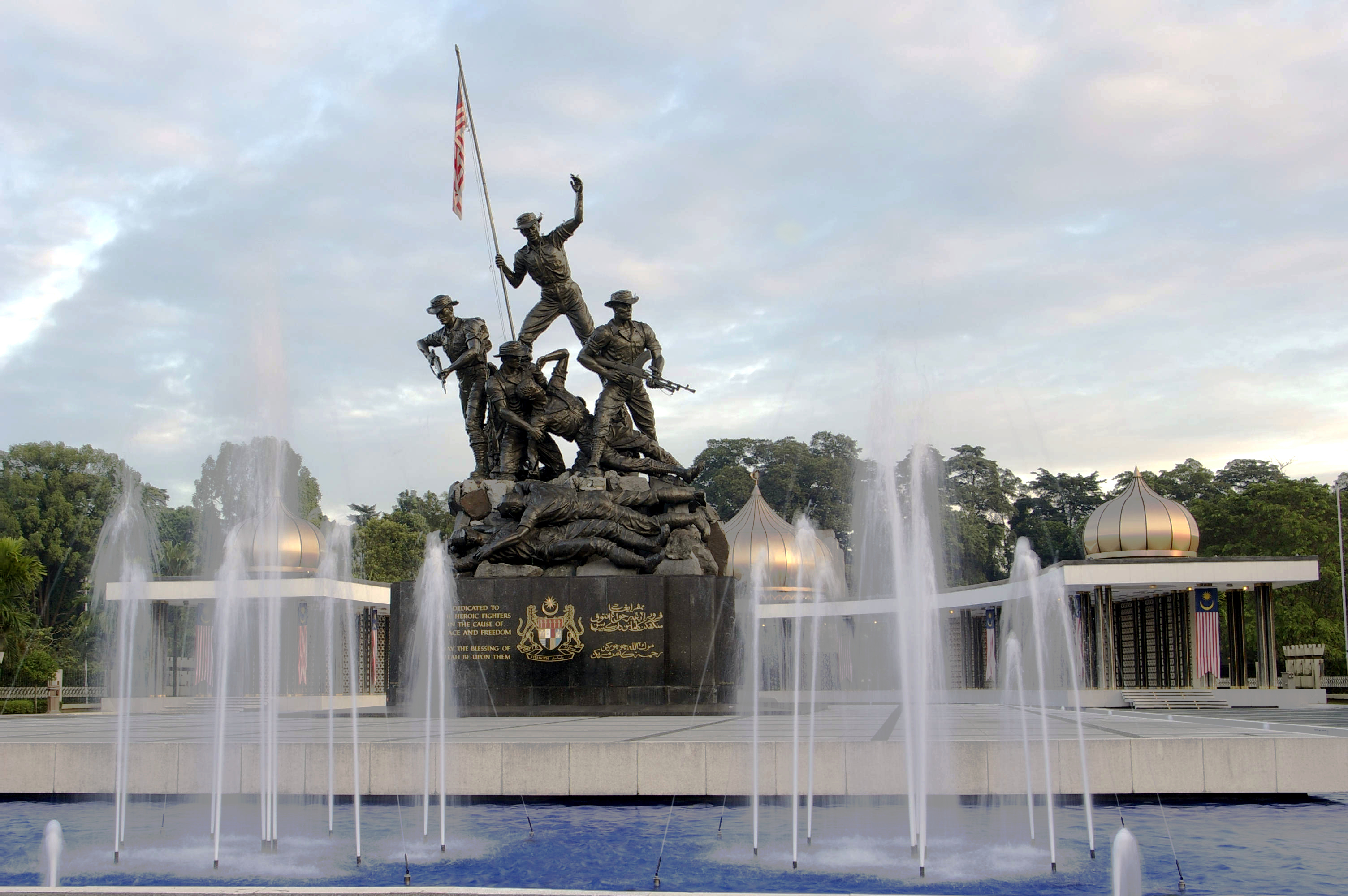
The National Monument commemorating those who died in Malaysia's struggle for freedom, including the Malayan Emergency

The Konfrontasi of 1963–1966 arose from tensions between Indonesia and the new British backed Federation of Malaysia that was conceived in the aftermath of the Malayan Emergency.

In the late 1960s, the coverage of the My Lai massacre during the Vietnam War prompted the initiation of investigations in the UK concerning war crimes perpetrated by British forces during the Emergency, such as the Batang Kali massacre. A 1948 investigation of those killings was later criticised as being a coverup and, in 1993, the Foreign Office intervened to prevent another from taking place. The British government agreed to investigate in 2009. In 2012, lawyers representing victims and their families received official documents relating to the massacre.

Following the end of the Malayan Emergency in 1960, the predominantly ethnic Chinese Malayan National Liberation Army, the armed wing of the MCP, retreated to the Malaysia–Thailand border where it regrouped and retrained for future offensives against the Malaysian government. A new phase of communist insurgency began in 1968. It was triggered when the MCP ambushed security forces in Kroh–Betong, in the northern part of Peninsular Malaysia, on 17 June 1968. The new conflict coincided with renewed tensions between ethnic Malays and Chinese following the 13 May incident of 1969, and the ongoing Vietnam War.

Communist leader Chin Peng spent much of the 1990s and early 2000s working to promote his perspective of the Emergency. In a collaboration with Australian academics, he met with historians and former Commonwealth military personnel at a series of meetings which led to the publication of Dialogues with Chin Peng: New Light on the Malayan Communist Party. Peng also travelled to England and teamed up with conservative journalist Ian Ward and his wife Norma Miraflor to write his autobiography Alias Chin Peng: My Side of History.

== List of battles/incidents during the Malayan Emergency ==
- Assassination of Sir Henry Gurney
- Batang Kali massacre
- Battle of Semur River
- Bukit Kepong incident
- Labis incident
- Operation Termite
- Penang ambush
- Sungai Siput incident

== In popular culture ==
In popular Malaysian culture, the Emergency has frequently been portrayed as a primarily Malay struggle against the communists. This perception has been criticised by some, such as Information Minister Zainuddin Maidin, for not recognising Chinese and Indian efforts.

A number of films have been set during the Emergency, including:

- The Planter's Wife (1952)
- Windom's Way (1957)
- The 7th Dawn (1964)
- The Virgin Soldiers (1969)
- Stand Up, Virgin Soldiers (1977)
- Bukit Kepong (1981)
- The Garden of Evening Mists (2019)

Other media:

- Mona Brand's stage production Strangers in the Land (1952) was created as political commentary to criticise the occupation, depicting plantation owners as burning down villages and collecting the heads of murdered Malayans as trophies. The play was only performed in the UK at the tiny activist-run Unity Theatre because the British government had banned the play from commercial stages.
- The Malayan Trilogy series of novels (1956–1959) by Anthony Burgess is set during the Malayan Emergency.
- In The Sweeney episode "The Bigger They Are" (series 4, episode 8; 26 October 1978), the tycoon Leonard Gold is being blackmailed by Harold Collins, who has a photo of him present at a massacre of civilians in Malaya when he was in the British Army twenty-five years earlier.
- Throughout the series Porridge, there are references to Fletcher having served in Malaya, probably as a result of National Service. He regales his fellow inmates with stories of his time there, and in one episode it is revealed that Prison Officer Mackay had also served in Malaya.

== See also ==
- Batang Kali massacre
- Battle of Semur River
- Briggs Plan
- British Far East Command
- British war crimes § Malaya
- Bukit Kepong incident
- Chin Peng
- Cold War in Asia
- Communist insurgency in Malaysia (1968–89)
- Far East Strategic Reserve (FESR)
- History of Malaysia
- List of weapons in Malayan Emergency
- Malayan Peoples' Anti-Japanese Army
- New village
