= The Templer Plan =

Malayan political directive

The Templer Plan was a political directive which laid out High Commissioner General Gerald Templer’s plan for the political and economic development of Malaya in the 1950s. It was outlined in a fifty-minute speech delivered on 19 March 1952, by General Templer to the Federal Legislative Council of Malaya. The Plan contained eighteen points on various social, economic, and political issues facing Malaya in light of the Malayan Emergency and as the nation prepared itself for self-government and eventually independence from the British. Several of the points were already covered in The Draft Development Plan of the Federation of Malaya 1950–55 which failed to be implemented due to The Malayan Emergency. It would serve as General Templer’s blueprint for governing the country during his two-year tenure as High Commissioner and Director of Operations of Malaya from 1952 to 1954.

The Templer Plan was based on an original Directive issued by the British Government named Directive issued to General Sir Gerald Walter Robert Templer, K.C.B., K.B.E., C.M.G., D.S.O., A.D.C., High Commissioner in and for the Federation of Malaya, by the Secretary of State for the Colonies on behalf of His Majesty's Government in the United Kingdom on 1 February 1952. Prior to delivering his speech on 19 March 1952, General Templer sent a draft of his speech for vetting to Oliver Lyttelton, the Secretary of State for the Colonies of the United Kingdom. Lyttelton approved the speech and stated it was “entirely in accord with Her Majesty’s Government’s policy”. The Plan was noteworthy for the breadth of the topics it covered, ranging from the contentious issue of citizenship that ultimately caused the downfall of the Malayan Union just four years earlier, to developing a national education system that would protect the rights of the ethnic Chinese in Malaya.

== Background ==
Following the end of World War 2, the British Colonial Government in Malaya faced a communist insurgency led by Chin Peng, the leader of the Malayan Communist Party. This was called the Malayan Emergency. While the first two years of the Emergency was marked by poor decision making and little progress being made against the communists, the situation improved drastically with the implementation of the Briggs Plan of 1950 which contained a forced resettlement program that effectively separated the MCP from its support base, the Min Yuen.

However, on 6 October 1951, the previous British High Commissioner to Malaya Sir Henry Gurney was murdered in an ambush attack by communist insurgents. Soon after, British Prime Minister Winston Churchill tasked Secretary of State for the Colonies Oliver Lyttelton with the task of finding a suitable replacement for Gurney. Lyttelton did not immediately settle on General Templer; his initial first choice was General Sir Brian Robertson who declined the offer as he wanted to spend more time in the United Kingdom after spending the previous twenty-eight out of thirty-one years abroad. Lyttelton eventually settled on Templer for his relative youth and wide experience commanding abroad.

== Preparation of The Templer Plan ==
Templer was originally unclear on what his main objective as British High Commissioner should be.

“The general object is obvious — viz., to restore law and order, and to bring back peace to the Federation [of Malaya]. I am clear as to what must happen from the purely military point of view. I am not at all clear as to what H.M.G. is aiming for from the political point of view. Is it a ‘united Malayan nation’? And if so, what exactly does this mean? Does it mean a merging of Malays and Chinese in one community — a long term project? I must have a clear policy to work on. I want to be given a directive from H.M.G. not so that I should shelter behind that directive — but rather that I can use it to publicly impress H.M.G’s purposes…”

The British government responded quickly to his request and issued the directive to Templer, containing eight key points in respect to the scope of his role as High Commissioner in Malaya in addition to underlining the British government's official goal for Malaya to “in due course become a fully self-governing nation”. Additionally, in a press interview by the Colonial Secretary, it was stated that

“There will be no field of administration, civil, or military, beyond his control…. The Government remains convinced that making headway against the Communists is as much as a political as a military task, and they are giving the new High Commissioner instructions which lay stress upon the constitutional and political development of the Federation”.

Thus, it was made clear that General Templer's role in Malaya was as military in so far as it was political — Templer was to defeat the communist insurgency while taking the necessary steps to prepare the country for independence.

== The Eighteen Points of The Templer Plan ==
In his speech, General Gerald Templer outlinted eighteen points which he believed to be crucial in Malaya's political and economic development and its ultimate goal in attaining independence.

1. The easing of citizenship rights.
2. The retraining of the Malayan Police.
3. The creation of a Malayan Army.
4. The improvement of medical and health services.
5. The development of a national education policy.
6. The importance of land tenure for agriculturalists.
7. The encouragement of youth movements.
8. The improvement of the Government's informational services.
9. The importance of progressive political progress.
10. The strengthening of the economic position of the Malays.
11. The overhauling of income tax.
12. The encouragement of industrial development.
13. The improvement of road communications.
14. The training of the civil service, both overseas and locally, to equip Malayans for high posts in the Government service.
15. The importance of economy in financial matters in view of the possibility of a sharp fall in the prices of rubber and tin.
16. The expansion of electric power resources.
17. The building up of the economy of the Malays.
18. The increase of local food production and agricultural output to render the country less dependent upon imports.

== See also ==
- Briggs Plan
- New Villages
- Independence Day
- 1950s in Malaysia
