= Liew Kon Kim =

Malaysian guerrilla

Liew Kon Kim was a Malayan National Liberation Army guerrilla who fought against the British during the Malayan Emergency. He was dubbed the "Bearded Terror" by the British.

His brother was also a guerrilla who contributed to attacks against British targets.

In July 1952 he was killed by a soldier of the Suffolk Regiment, Raymond Hands, and his corpse was publicly displayed in several locations around Malaya as proof of his death.
