= Battle of Semur River =

1950 battle of the Malayan Emergency

- Part of the Malayan Emergency
Date	25 March 1950
Location	Gua Musang, Kelantan
Result	Communist Force tactical victory • Malayan police defensive victory (counter-attack)

Belligerents
Federation of Malaya	Malayan National Liberation Army

Commanders and leaders
(Malaysia) Lt. Hassan Bin Yassin † (Malaysia) Cpl. Jamaludin Mohamad (Malaysia) Sgt. Wan Yaacob	Unknown

Units involved
Malay Regiment; Federation of Malaya Police	Unknown

Strength
25 soldiers 16 SC officers	40 –250 fighters

Casualties and losses
17 killed 2 wounded	29 killed

Battle of Semur River (Malay: Pertempuran Di Sungai Semur) was an armed encounter which took place on 25 March 1950 between the Malay Regiment and the gunmens of Malayan Communist Party during the Malayan Emergency. Seventeen soldiers of the Malay Regiment, from 12th Platoon of Delta Company were killed by the rebels, and eight wounded. Twenty-nine communist insurgents were also killed by the Malayan soldiers.

== Chronology ==
In early March 1950, the Delta Company, 3rd Battalion of Malay Regiment stationed in Pengkalan Chepa, Kelantan was deployed to a "search and destroy" mission near Gua Musang, Hulu Kelantan. Base of the company were as follows:

- Company Headquarters of 11th Platoon and 12th Platoon in Pengkalan Pulai,
- Company Headquarters of 10th Platoon in Bertam

On 23 March 1950, 0730 hours, 12th Platoon, D Company with a strength of 25 members led by Second Lieutenant Hassan Bin Yassin, Corporal Jamaludin Bin Mohamad, four Lance Corporals and 19 soldiers assigned to patrol at Nenggiri river for three days. The platoon was also followed by 16 Malay Special Constables were given the assignment to scout 18 Chinese from Pulai village to an area a few hours walk to collect nipa roofs. On Thursday, 23 March, they left Pulai village. After the Chinese had reached their destination the Malay platoon trekked on, leaving behind the 16 Special Constables with the roof-gathers. The platoon camped that night deep in the jungle and the 16 Special Constables stayed with the Chinese.

At 9.15 am on Saturday morning, the officer-in-charge, a Second Lieutenant Hassan told the Sergeant Wan Yaacob who led the Special Constables that the platoon was going back to Pulai, however the roof-gathers had not yet finished their job. So, the Lieutenant instructed the Sergeant and his men to stay with the Chinese and lead his men to return to Pulai as soon as they had completed their job.

An hour and a half later the Malay platoon suddenly came under heavy attack from gunmens of the Malayan National Liberation Army (MNLA) on the south bank of the Semur river from shallow trenches prepared along the opposite bank. The platoon commander, 2nd Lieutenant Hassan and several his comrades were killed in the first fusillade. Then, Corporal Jamaludin took command of 12th Platoon, directing the fire of the remnants of the platoon. He ordered a counter-attack by firing mortar 2 inches, however it was hampered by a large quantity of bamboo trees that covered the area. After releasing two rounds of mortar shells, the mortar section members were killed. Cpl Jamaludin and some other members who may seek refuge in cozying up to the cliff threw a grenade towards the enemy, but failed because they were also fired from the opposite bank and in an enclosed, very difficult to move and take positions to counter-attack. In the battle intensifying the few members of the communist cozying up to the position of the Malay Regiment members were injured and killed is to confiscate their weapons, but was blocked. At one point, four of the communists who tried to approach them from behind were shot dead by the Private Abdul Wahab Bin Hamid. The MNLA stopped firing. Calls to the platoon to surrender were answered with hails of bullets and several gunmens who attempt to close in on Malay soldiers were shot dead. But after fighting for four hours and ran out of bullets, remnants of the survivors were surrounded and captured. This is the first time in the history of the security forces had been captured by communist guerrillas.

They were taken to the enemy camp and forced to hand over their equipment. After two hours in custody, and given lectures indoctrination and warned not to oppose against the communists, they were unexpectedly released. Cpl Jamaludin and its members sent to the Pengkalan Pulai before being abandoned halfway.

Two others were seriously injured members, Private Abdul Wahab Bin Hamid and Private Rashid Hassan had to be abandoned on the battlefield together 14 more bodies of those killed. This is because they are no longer able to walk and will delay the movement to return to base to get help. The reinforcement, 11th Platoon of Malay Regiment and the Police Jungle Squad, along with Cpl. Jamaludin arrived on 27 March 1950, at 10 am to rescue them.

In total, 17 soldiers of 12th Platoon, 3rd Regiment were killed, against the enemies who estimated 40 peoples. Another six were seriously injured and slightly injured two members. What is remarkable though is that the members of Platoon 12 were outnumbered but were still able to provide stiff resistance and managed to kill 29 insurgents. The bodies were found by making a Platoon 11 near the ambush. It is believed many more injuries because there was a lot of blood in the paths they retreated down. The enemy strength was estimated at 250 during the event based on the size of the fort that was built by them.

== Reinforcements from Special Constables ==
During the attack, Sergeant Wan Yaacob heard the gunfiring and he knew that the Malay platoon was in under attacked. He told the Chinese to stay where they were and he led his men to the place where the gunfiring came from.

Sergeant Wan Yaacob and his 15 Special Constables hasted towards the sound of battle and split into two groups. Seven SCs came under fire and suffered casualties while attempt to cross the river. The Sergeant and the remainder, scouting round the flank of the communist positions on the north bank, spotted a communist Bren gunner and shot him dead, but then, on seeing that the platoon was being finally overwhelmed.
