= Briggs Plan =

1950 British forced resettlement plan during the Malayan Emergency

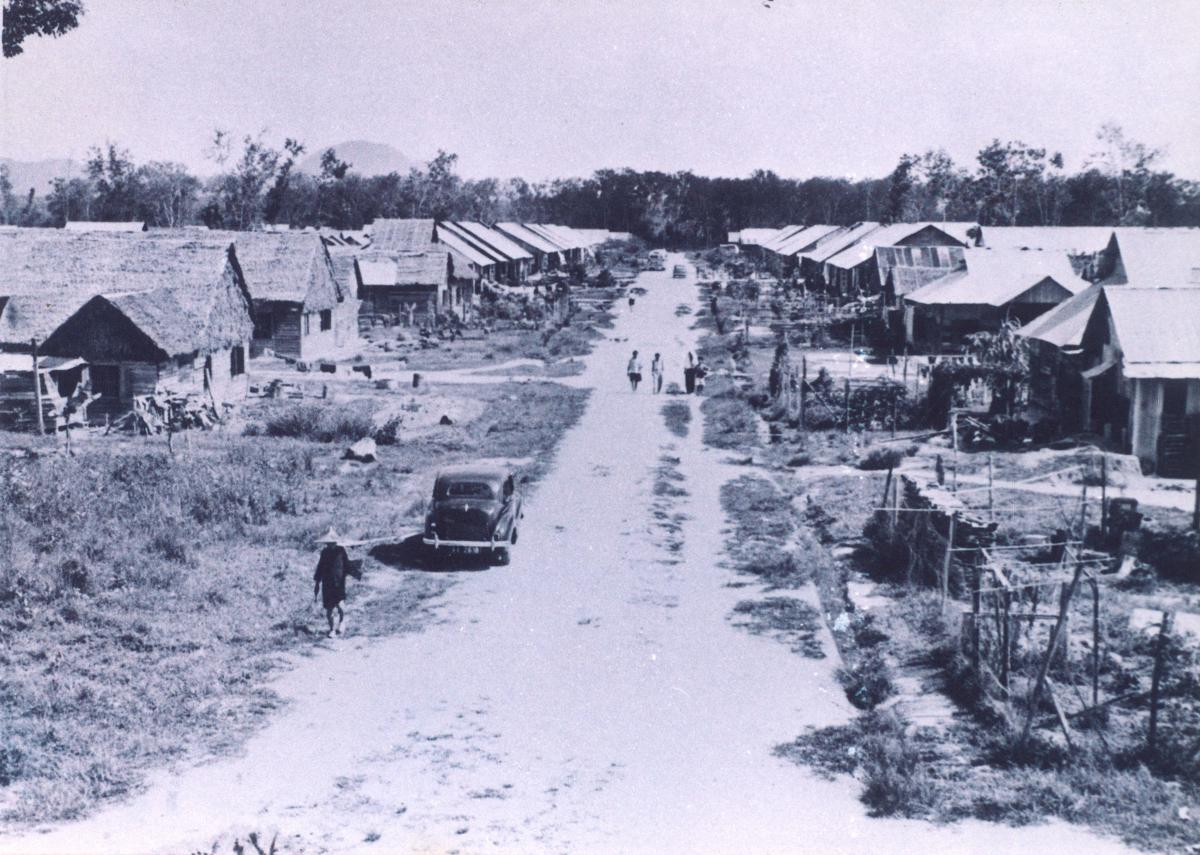
Photograph of a model new village, designed as part of the Briggs Plan to separate the largely Chinese Malaysian rural populace from communist guerrillas.

The Briggs Plan (Malay: Rancangan Briggs) was a military plan devised by British General Sir Harold Briggs shortly after his appointment in 1950 as Director of Operations during the Malayan Emergency (1948–1960). The plan went into effect on April 3, 1950. The plan aimed to defeat the Malayan National Liberation Army by cutting them off from their sources of support amongst the rural population. To achieve this a large programme of forced resettlement of Malayan peasantry was undertaken, under which about 500,000 people (roughly 10% of Malaya's population) were forcibly transferred from their land and moved to concentration camps euphemistically referred to as "new villages".

During the Emergency, scholars estimate that over 450 such settlements were created, though precise figures vary across sources. Furthermore, 10,000 Malaysian Chinese suspected of being communist sympathizers were deported to the People's Republic of China in 1949. The Orang Asli were also targeted for forced relocation by the Briggs Plan because the British believed that they were supporting the communists. Many of the practices necessary for the Briggs Plan are now prohibited under Article 17 of Additional Protocol II to the Geneva Conventions which forbids civilian deportations and internment of civilian populations beyond actual civilian security and military necessity in non-international conflicts.

== Purpose ==
The plan aimed to defeat the insurgents in Malaya by cutting them off from their source of support among the rural Chinese population. The British realized that many Chinese residents were isolated and unchecked by the government. By relocating these populations into "New Villages," the insurgents were prevented from receiving support from the rural population without exposing themselves to British security forces, later the Malayan Home Guard. This also forced the insurgents not to build large regular units to combat the British, therefore neutralizing Min Yuen.

This plan also gave many Chinese people in Malaya an excuse not to join the insurgents, but to instead join the British, due to the many benefits that would be provided.

== History ==
British authority in Malaya's rural areas had been only tenuously re-established after the surrender of the Empire of Japan at the end of the Second World War. The British regarded a group of about 500,000 "squatters", largely of Chinese descent, who practised small-scale agriculture, generally lacked legal title to their land, and were largely outside the reach of the colonial administration, as particularly problematic. Many of the Chinese people had been forced to live in isolated communities to avoid being slaughtered by the occupying Japanese.

Several Malayan communities formed the backbone of the Malayan Communist Party (MCP); its armed wing, the Malayan National Liberation Army (MNLA); and its civilian supplies and intelligence network, the Min Yuen. Many rural workers were sympathetic to communism for the role of the MCP in leading the anti-Japanese resistance movement during World War II. Other factors which led to support for the communists included the desire for Malayan independence from Britain, the communist victory in China, the communist role in leading the Malayan trade union movement and postwar economic inequality and poverty.

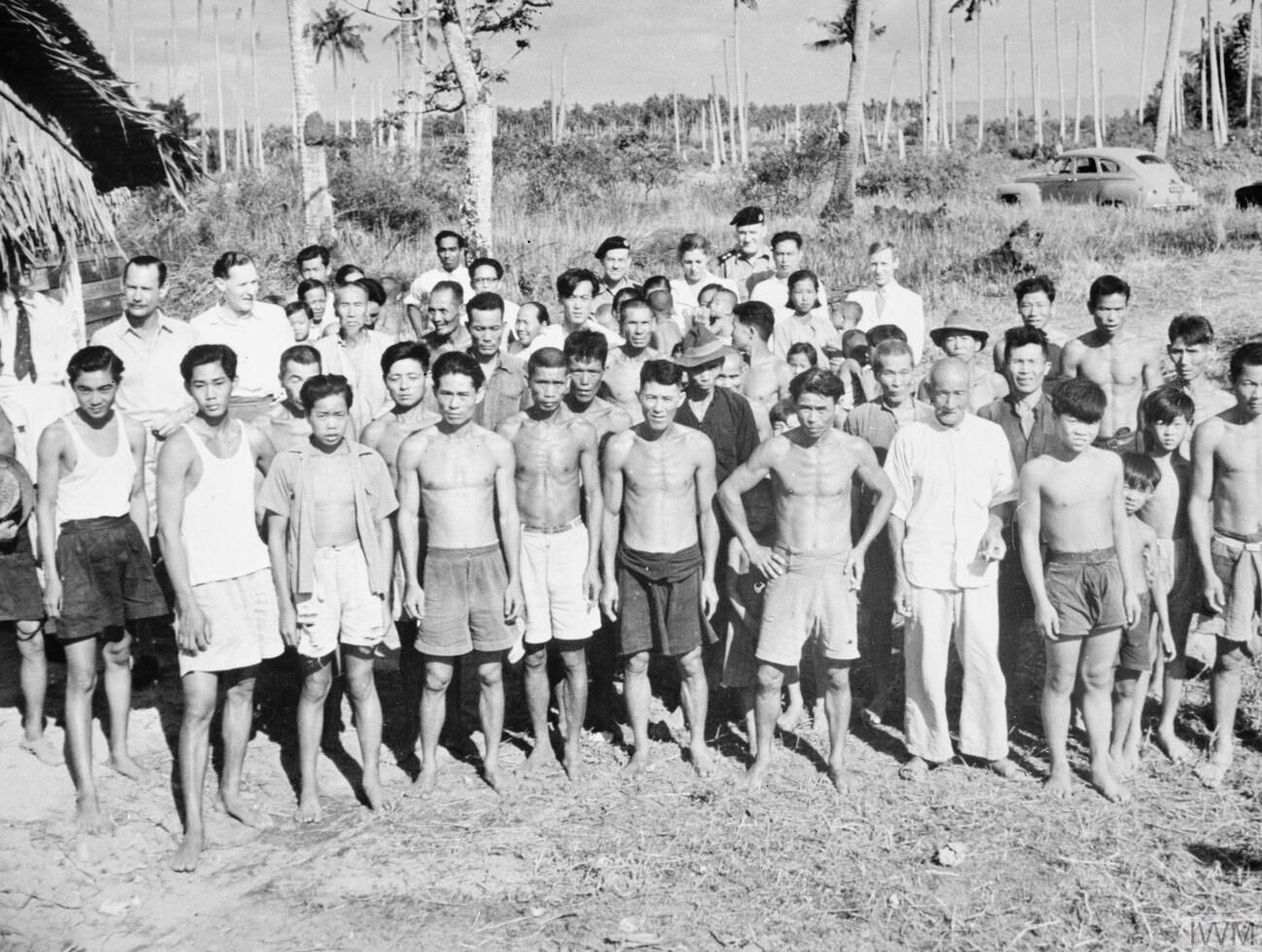
Civilians forcefully relocated by the British military as part of the Briggs Plan

By isolating the population into the "new villages" that has roughly 1000 people in each village, the British stemmed the critical flow of food, information, especially from Chinese, and recruits from the peasants to the guerillas. In addition, the Briggs Plan fundamentally altered the conduct of the Malayan Emergency by forcing guerrillas to fight outside the jungle, exposing them to British forces..The new settlements were guarded around the clock by police, and many were partially fortified with barbed wire and sentry towers. That prevented those who were so inclined from sneaking out and voluntarily aiding the guerrillas, and it also prevented the guerrillas from sneaking in and extracting help by persuasion or intimidation. The process created 450 new settlements, and an estimated 470,509 people, 400,000 of them ethnically Chinese, were involved in the program. The Malaysian Chinese Association, then known as the Malayan Chinese Association, played a crucial role in implementing the programme.

The British also tried to win the support of some of the settled civilians by providing them with education and health services. Residents were to receive title to a parcel of land on which they could farm. Some New Villages were equipped with amenities, such as electricity and piped water, and had a perimeter surrounded with fencing and armed guards to keep the civilians from escaping, many of whom had been in the MCP or had been forced to provide assistance. In addition, British installed curfew so anyone who is outside during the curfew hours will be declared hostile and shot on sight.It was hoped that by providing the communities, which were mainly ethnic Chinese with such facilities, they would be converted from "reservoirs of resentment into bastions of loyal Malayan citizenry". Scholars have argued, however, that the predominantly Chinese composition of the New Villages had significant long-term political consequences. According to Amrita Malhi, writing in the peer-reviewed journal Bandung, the Briggs Plan established the basis for racial essentialism in Malaysian politics by relocating the Chinese population out of the Malay interior, shaping conditions for what later became a racially divided political order.

Previously, the Chinese rural workers and peasants had been spread out geographically, but the Briggs Plan would now bring together rural Chinese from all over the country and concentrate them in the New Villages. There was significant resentment towards the programme both among the Chinese and Malays. The Malaysian Chinese were sometimes targeted for collective punishment, preventive detention and summary deportation, which were aimed at weeding out communist supporters, and the Malays were incensed at the infrastructure provided for the New Villages since their own settlements had remained undeveloped. One example collective punishment came from Tanjung Malim, where the British put the civilian population on rice rations to stop them from supporting the communist guerrillas. When that did not work, Gerald Templer halved the rice rations for civilians within the area and imposed a 22-hour curfew.

== Similar examples ==
A similar “Four Cuts” strategy was used against villages and insurgents of the Burmese Communist Party in the Pegu Range.

General Gerald Templer, who served as High Commissioner for Malaya from 1952, is credited with coining the phrase "hearts and minds" to describe his combined military and political approach to the insurgency. The Strategic Hamlet Program, implemented in South Vietnam from 1962, was similarly inspired by the Malayan resettlement model, aiming to concentrate rural populations into fortified positions to isolate them from communist insurgents.
