= Min Yuen =

Civilian branch of the Malayan National Liberation Army

The Min Yuen (Chinese: 民運; pinyin: Mínyùn; Malay: Gerakan Rakyat) was the civilian branch of the Malayan National Liberation Army (MNLA), the armed wing of the Malayan Communist Party (MCP), in resisting the British colonial occupation of Malaya during the Malayan Emergency, the Min Yuen was mainly charged with supplying communist revolutionaries with food, information, and medical supplies.

Since the beginning of the Emergency, the British Government recognized the Min Yuen to be especially problematic to their counter-insurgency operations. As the Min Yuen was made up of ordinary civilians, its members were indistinguishable from the rest of the population, making it impossible for security forces to instantly recognize and arrest them. Hence, the British government found it imperative to isolate the Min Yuen as far as possible from the communist guerrillas based in the jungle. This was achieved under the Briggs Plan when 400,000 civilians were forced into a network of internment camps called "new villages" which sought to separate the communist revolutionaries from their civilian supporters.

== Names ==
The term Min Yuen began appearing following the declaration of the Emergency in June 1948. It is the romanization of the two-character abbreviated form of the Chinese term Minzhong Yuendong (Chinese: 民眾運動; pinyin: Mínzhòng Yùndòng; lit. 'people's movement').

== History ==
=== Membership ===
In May 1948, at a security conference in Kuala Lumpur, Lieutenant Colonel John Dalley estimated that there were 5,000 members of the MNLA who had already taken up arms against the British colonial occupation of Malaya and 250,000 members of the Min Yuen and other CPM-affiliated organizations. In the early years of the Emergency from 1948 to 1951, the MNLA frequently attracted recruits from the Min Yuen to join their guerilla army. Many opposed colonial British rule and were inspired by the success of the Chinese Communist Party in defeating the Kuomintang in 1949.

During the peak of the Emergency from late 1951 to early 1952, there were roughly 50,000 members of the Min Yuen. However, with the mass internment of nearly 500,000 Chinese civilians into prison camps called "new villages" by 1952, the Min Yuen were greatly hampered in their ability to meet with communist guerrillas. The new villages were located away from the jungle, had perimeter fencing, and were guarded by Special Constables (and later the Home Guard). This made it difficult for communist sympathizers to freely meet and supply communist guerrillas with food and information.

=== Infiltration by the Special Branch ===
Under the Briggs Plan, the Special Branch was tasked with penetrating the Min Yuen and destroying the MCP from within. While the Special Branch did not manage to penetrate the upper ranks of the MNLA and MCP leadership hierarchy, they were successful in inserting undercover agents into the Min Yuen.

In some scenarios, once the Special Branch had gathered sufficient information on known Min Yuen members, they would threaten to arrest and punish them under Emergency Regulations unless they agreed to cooperate. In other situations, the Special Branch would plant misinformation in the Min Yuen knowing that it would be passed on to communist guerrillas as genuine, thereby destroying the credibility of the Min Yuen as a reliable source of intelligence.

== See also ==
- Viet Cong
- Harold Briggs
- Psychological warfare
