= S. A. Ganapathy =

Malaysian trade unionist

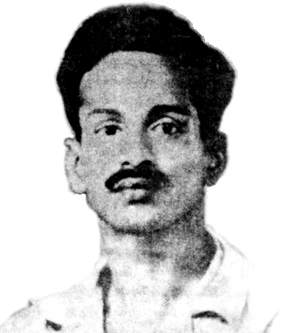
- Born: 1912; Thambikkottai Keelakkadu Sundaram Village, Tanjore, Madras Province, British India
- Died: 4 May 1949 (age 37); Pudu Prison, Kuala Lumpur, British Malaya
- Cause of death: Execution by hanging
- Military career
- Allegiance: Federated Malay States (to 1941); Malayan People's Anti-Japanese Army (to 1942); Azad Hind (to 1945); Malayan Communist Party
- Branch: Malaya Command (to 1941); Malayan People's Anti-Japanese Army (to 1942); Indian National Army; Malayan National Liberation Army
- Service years: 1940–41; 1941–42; 1942–45; 1945–49
- Conflicts: World War II; Malayan Emergency (executed)
- Other work: Trade unionist

S.A. Ganapathy (1912 – 4 May 1949) was a veteran of the communist underground resistance during Japanese occupation and postwar trade unionist in then Malaya (Peninsular Malaysia). He was once the president of Malaya's largest trade union, the Pan Malayan Federation of Trade Unions (PMFTU).

During the Malayan Emergency, he was arrested by the British colonial occupation and convicted for illegally possessing a firearm. He was hanged by British forces in 1949.

== Personal life ==
There is no evidence supporting the claim that Ganapathy was born in 1912 in Thambikkottai Keelakkadu Sundaram Village in Thanjavur District, Tamil Nadu, South India. However, High Commissioner of Malaya, Sir Henry Gurney stated in a telegram to Colonial Office dated 2 May 1949, that Ganapathy was born in 1917.

Ganapathy's father was Arumugam Thevar and his mother's name was Vairathaal. After losing both his parents to cholera, he and his brother Sarguna, lived with their sister Vairamal. Later, at the age of 10, they migrated to Singapore with his uncle and grandfather, Subramaniam Thevar.

== Involvement in politics ==
Ganapathy was involved in political activities and volunteered with the Indian National Army. He returned to India around 1946 to participate in the Inter-Asian Conference which was held from 26 March to 2 April 1947 at Old Fort, Delhi. The conference was hosted by Nehru who headed the provisional government of India. Mahatma Gandhi spoke at the closing event on 2 April 1947.

S.A. Ganapathy, the first president of the 300,000-strong Pan Malayan Federation of Trade Unions (PMFTU), was hanged by British authorities in Malaya on 4 May 1949 after being convicted for allegedly being in possession of firearms. Ganapathy was said to be on the way to the police to surrender his firearms, when he was arrested and sentenced to hang in Pudu Prison, Kuala Lumpur. His close allies and mentor Guru Devan, Anthonysamy, Arumugam Thevar from Thambikkottai, Kittu Thevar of Thambikottai Marvakkadu and many others were deported to India.

Following Ganapathy's execution, a huge protest was staged in Tamil Nadu. Former Tamil Nadu Chief Minister M. Karunanithi wrote a poem titled "Kayertril Thongiya Ganapathi" in protesting the execution of Ganapathy.

S.A. Ganapathy was believed to have written to his cousin's husband, Ramu Thevar, about his death sentence and request his body to be cremated. Unfortunately due to the letter, Ramu was arrested on suspicion and was kept in detention in Pulau Jerejak for two months. After Ganapathy's death, Sargunan was deported to Tamil Nadu. His family members also moved to India.

To commemorate his legacy, a small monument was built by members of the Communist Party of India in Thambikottai, Thanjavur Taluk, Tamil Nadu, which was inaugurated in 1986.
