= Eu Chooi Yip =

Malaysian politician and Singaporean activist

Eu Chooi Yip (simplified Chinese: 余柱业; traditional Chinese: 余柱業; pinyin: Yú Zhùyè; 2 December 1918 – 4 October 1995) was a prominent member of the anti-colonial and Communist movements in Malaya and Singapore in the 1950s and 1960s.

He served as the secretary of the Malayan Democratic Union (MDU) and was later a member of the Anti-British League and the Communist Party of Malaya (MCP). He was responsible for the underground communist movement in Singapore in the 1950s and 1960s.

He was the Secretary-General of the Malayan National Liberation League in Beijing. During the Cultural Revolution, he was one of the directors taking in charge of the radio station, the "voice of the Malayan Revolution". He returned to Singapore in 1991 and served as a senior research fellow at the Institute of East Asian Philosophy in Singapore. He died on 4 October 1995 in Singapore at the age of 76.

== Biography ==
=== Early life and education ===
Eu was born on 2 December 1918 in Kuantan, Malaysia. Eu's parents came from Taishan, Guangdong, and operated a medicine shop in Malaysia. He came to Singapore to study with his brother and sister. He attended Victoria School while his sister went to Nanyang Girls' High School. As a child, he was taught by his sister about Sino-Japanese War and of the suffering caused by Japanese occupation. At that time, the Chinese Communist Party established a Nanyang branch which organised communist movements among overseas Chinese and also influenced Eu.

In 1938, Eu received an entrance scholarship to Raffles College. He became one of the top graduates there and became a close friend of Goh Keng Swee, who would go on to serve as Singapore's deputy prime minister.

As a Chinese student, Eu was politically aroused by China's struggle against Japan. He became interested in politics and developed Chinese nationalism. Influenced by Edgar Snow's Book, Red Star Over China, Eu came to respect the Chinese communists but did not accept their ideology in its entirety.

=== Malayan Democratic Union ===
After graduating in 1940, Eu worked as a Labour Inspector for the colonial government in Kuala Lumpur. When the Japanese attacked Kuala Lumpur in 1942, Eu moved to Singapore and worked as a clerk for Overseas Insurance Company. During the Japanese occupation of Singapore, he worked in statistical offices. Following the Japanese surrender, he went back to work for the colonial government. When the Chinese leftist writer, Hu Yuzhi, published an article in Fengxia magazine in 1945 which criticised slavish colonial mentality, he became ashamed of having served in the British and Japanese colonial administrations.

The Malayan Democratic Union (MDU), the first fledged political party, was formed in Singapore in December 1945 by English-educated intellectuals. Eu resigned from the colonial administration and joined the MDU as a full-time activist in Singapore in 1946 and became a stringer for the English language newspaper, the Straits Times. The party was involved in the failed anti-Federation movement through the All-Malayan Council of Joint Action–Pusat Tenaga Ra'ayat (AMCJA-PUTERA) alliance, alongside the Communist Party of Malaya or Malayan Communist Party (MCP), which opposed the constitutional proposals that led to the formation of the Federation of Malaya.

In 1947, Eu replaced Lim Hong Bee as the party's secretary. Following the onset of open war between the Communists and the newly established Federation, known as the Malayan Emergency, Eu rejected any connection between the AMCJA and the MCP and declared that he was not a communist. At the time, Eu was described as an English-educated radical who had pro-communist sympathies, but were not communists.

=== Joining the Communist movement ===
The MCP established the Anti-British League (ABL) and the student organisations in 1948, which strongly influenced Eu's left-wing thoughts. One MCP leader, Ah Chin, made a decision to extend its influence among English-educated intelligentsia and absorb suitable ones into the party. The English-speaking section leader of the ABL, Wong Siong Nien, was sent to persuade Eu. Eu started to embrace communism in at the end of 1948 and actively engaged in the ABL. As Eu had a bachelor's degree and could speak both Mandarin and English, he was employed extensively by the party.

Eu was assigned to develop the communist underground movement in Singapore and recruit ABL members among both English-speaking and Chinese-speaking intellectuals. A large number of students in University of Malaya who were political radicals engaged in clandestine activities and developed connections with the ABL and the MCP. He successfully persuaded his three MDU colleagues P.V. Sarma, Dr. Joseph K.M. Tan, Lim Chan Yong, and Lim Kean Chye to join in the communist party. They visited middle-class families to collect donation for the MCP and the ABL activities. He worked an editor for the Freedom News, which distributed communist propaganda. Lim Chan Yong and Joseph K.M. Tan founded the pro-communist paper, Malayan Orchid. Thanks in part to Eu's efforts, the Chinese-speaking ABL recruited 2,000 members in June 1950, including into its worker's and student's sections. A number of ABL members gained admission into the MCP through ABL activities, including Eu himself who became an official member of the MCP in 1950.

In 1951, the colonial government undertook a security campaign that saw the arrest of many members of the ABL as well as former members of the MDU. Organisations such as the Singapore Teachers’ Union, the Singapore Cooperative Society and the University of Malaya were targeted. They included John Eber and Joseph K.M. Tan. Many students were also detained and charged with editing pro-communist paper. Eu and Lim escaped arrest as they were in Beijing at the time.

Eu's close friend, S Rajaratnam gave him shelter while he was hiding from the British during this time and helped Eu get medical treatment for his tuberculosis. As the colonial government was suppressing the communist movement in Singapore, Eu was asked to go to Jakarta, Indonesia under the order of Yeung Kuo, deputy secretary general of the MCP, and continued his work for the MCP.

=== Working in Jakarta as a Communist Party leader ===
In Jakarta, Eu established a party branch, which directed the communist activities in Singapore remotely. He took direct orders from Chin Peng, the secretary-general of MCP, and was the superior of Fong Chong Pik. The MCP planned to co-operate with Lee Kuan Yew and trying to help establish the People's Action Party (PAP). The truth of the story between the MCP and Lee Kuan Yew remains controversial, because Eu, Fong Chong Pik, and Lee Kuan Yew had different claims about the event. According to Eu, the party committee in Indonesia and Chin Peng did not give Fong the authority, but he voluntarily took charge of all party affairs in Singapore and began to meet with Lee Kuan Yew.

In 1957, Eu went back to Singapore to observe the general election. After the meeting with Eu, Fong went to meet Lee. Lee claimed that Fong had wanted to establish a united front against colonialism. As the MCP received support from the masses, especially the left-wing, the MCP's support for the PAP could have helped Lee win the election. In addition, the MCP expected that Lee would not take actions against the party once he took power. Following the split of Barisan Sosialis from the PAP, the party came to the realisation that it could not co-operate with Lee.

In the early 1960s, when Sukarno served as the president of Indonesia, the MCP could organise activities publicly. Through the co-operation with Communist Party of Indonesia, Eu established the Malayan National Liberation League. In 1963, he served as the secretary of the Southern Bureau of the MCP and made guidelines for underground activities in Singapore. To avoid a concentration of members in Jakarta and prepare for the resumption of underground activities in Malaya, many party members were sent to Medan, Aceh, Bagansiapiapi of Sumatra and to Bintan Island and Batam Island of the Riau islands, in mid-1964. These member helped to establish new bases or new liaison stations.

However, after the 30 September Movement in 1965 that suppressed the Communist movements in Indonesia, Eu was arrested, and later released to China. The MCP began to operate secretly and no institutions were open publicly. The Malayan National Liberation League which was open publicly in Beijing actually represented the MCP, and Eu served as its secretary-general.

=== Director of the Voice of Malayan Revolution in Sifang Mountain ===
When the MCP retreated to the border between Malaysia and Thailand, a radio station called "the Voice of Malayan Revolution" was also established which broadcast battlefield reports of Malayan Peoples’ Liberation Army. As the radio station was destroyed by the Malaysian Army in July 1968, Mao Zedong helped the MCP rebuilt the radio station in Sifang Mountain, Changsha, Hunan Province in 1969 (during the period of Cultural Revolution). The radio station used four languages, Chinese, Malay, Tamil and English, to broadcast in Southeast Asia. Eu was director of the radio station's Chinese branch. The broadcast scripts of the Voice of Malayan Revolution were recorded by a group of Barisan Sosialis members, including historian C. C. Chin. They completed the texts and published them in the Singapore leftist newspapers, such as Zhenxian Bao (Front), Party News, and People's Forum. These newspapers routinely published the frequency and wavelength of the radio station. A number of "red" cartoons, photos, and poems are also published. After Operation ColdStore, Barisan Sosialis lost its ability to compete with the PAP, but it was still a significant opposition party. However, by using the rhetoric of Cultural Revolution, the Barisan's political agenda was dramatically radicalised which led to self-destruction. The left in Singapore isolated themselves by following the political line of Mao's China and they no longer received support from the people, which gave the PAP's confidence to fight the left through legal means.

The radio station of "the Voice of Malayan Revolution" which was operated in the border between Malaysia and Thailand was very effective. According to Chen Yinghong, the radio broadcast strongly influenced members in guerrilla of the MCP. Party members studied quotations from Mao Zedong and sang "Red Songs". People were interested in the battlefield reports of guerrilla of the MCP. A number of young people in Southeast Asian were encouraged to join in the MCP. However, the new radio station in Sifang Mountain failed to attract young people to join the party. The Chinese communists only provided technical support for the radio broadcast and did not give any suggestions for the press releases. Eu and his collagues often took news reports from other publications and rephrased them in a pro-communist manner.

=== Return to Singapore ===
In the early 1980s, when Deng Xiaoping came into power, the Cultural Revolution was ended and China sought to normalise relations with countries in Southeast Asia. As a resut, support for "the Voice of Malayan Revolution" was revoked in 1981. The non-Chinese citizens who were willing to stay in China were arranged jobs. Eu was arranged to teach English in Changsha Railway University in Hunan. In 1989, Singapore and China started negotiations to establish diplomatic relations. Eu's classmate in Raffles College, now deputy prime minister of Singapore Goh Keng Swee, sent him a message through the International Department of the Chinese Communist Party inviting him to work as a consultant for the negotiations. Eu accepted the invitation and later returned to Singapore in 1991. He served as a senior research fellow at Institute of East Asian philosophy in Singapore, until his death in 1995.

== Eu Chooi Yip's reflection on revolutionary history ==
Eu Chooi Yip helped to create an oral history interview, Lang Jian Zhu Meng (Pursuing Dreams beyond the High Seas: Oral History of Eu Chooi Yip) and Political History in Singapore 1945-1965. In these books, he provided his own reflections on revolutionary history in Southeast Asia, including his opinions on the development and failure of the MCP.

=== The contribution of the MCP ===
Eu Chooi Yip experienced the whole period of Maoist revolution in Southeast Asia. He believes that the MCP has great contribution in the history. This contribution has two main parts. First, the MCP participated in the battle against fascism during World War II. The MCP cooperated with the British Special Operations Executive, Force 136 and became an important regional power of the allied in Southeast Asia. As the ultimate goal of the MCP was to seize power of all states, the MCP fought hard against the Japanese invaders. Military leaders (Chin Peng) of the MCP were awarded for Order of the British Empire after the war. The second contribution of the MCP is their struggle against British colonial rule. After World War II, the United Kingdom planned to prevent the expansion of communism and continue to maintain its colonial rule in Malaya. The MCP launched an armed struggle against colonialism and forced the British to abandon its colonial rule in Malaya and Singapore.

=== The failure of the MCP ===
When Malaysia got independence in the 1957, the country was on the way of nation-building and development. However, Eu Chooi Yip believed that the MCP failed because it did not recognise the legitimacy of Malaysia.

During the late 1970s, when Eu Chooi Yip was working in "Voice of Malayan Revolution", he was trying to find answers that why the MCP was not able to receive support from the masses. He believes that the land reform policies made by the MCP were wrong.
