= Sang Saka Malaya =

Malay republican flag

- Other names: Sang Saka Merah Putih, Bendera Rakyat; Bendera Malaya Merdeka
- Use: Other
- Proportion: 1:2
- Adopted: c. 1947
- Design: Twelve stars arranged in three rows of four columns on red and white background
- Designed by: Joint PUTERA-AMCJA

The Sang Saka Malaya, sometimes shortened from Sang Pusaka Malaya, is known as the flag of the Parti Kebangsaan Melayu Malaya. It is also known as Bendera Rakyat. The flag features twelve stars arranged in three rows of four columns. It was introduced in 1947 by the combination of two political parties, Pusat Tenaga Ra'ayat (PUTERA) and the All-Malaya Council of Joint Action (AMCJA), as a proposal to the flag of an independent Federation of Malaya. According to a report by The Straits Times in 1947, The twelve stars represent the 12 states of the Malay Peninsula. It follows the concept of the American flag with 50 stars representing the 50 states that make up the United States.

The flag is commonly associated with republican independence movements and, to a certain extent, leftist movements in Malaysia. These movements support the abolition of the Malaysian monarchs in favour of a republic, similar to what occurred in Indonesia, where many local monarchies were stripped of power through integration.

A newer variation arose in 2007 designed by Angkatan Muda Keadilan (PKR Youth) leader, Najwan Halimi. This flag was carried by supporters of Himpunan Janji Demokrasi. This variation included a crescent moon and a star with eleven vertices on the original red and white flag. It was the national flag controversy that had arisen around the 56th anniversary of Malaysia's independence in 2013.

== History ==
=== Nusantara sentiment ===
The use of red and white colors on the flags in the states of Nusantara has been used since before the 13th century, as found on the banners of the Majapahit kingdom, Banggai kingdom, Bone state and Soppeng kingdom in South Sulawesi. However, it has been suggested that the red and white symbolism can trace its origin to the older common Austronesian mythology of the duality of Mother Earth (red) and Father Sky (white). This is why these colours appear in so many flags throughout Austronesia, from Tahiti to Madagascar.

When Indonesia was colonised by the Dutch for 340 years, Indonesia was forced to use the Dutch flag with three rows of red-white-blue colours. As a symbol of opposition to colonialism, the revolutionary youth tore the last blue row of the Dutch flag in the 'Yamato Hotel incident' in 1945. The blue colour of the colonial flag was considered to symbolise the 'blue blood' or noble blood of the Western colonisers, as found on the flags of the Netherlands, England (Union Jack), France and the United States. The red colour is considered to symbolise the blood spilled during the war of independence and the white colour is considered to symbolise the purity of the people. For the Malays, the sovereignty of kings is expressed through the colour yellow.

=== KMM origins ===
The red and white flag, called just Sang Saka, that was used by groups which supported the creation of Indonesia Raya and its sentiment was first brought to Malaya by Kesatuan Melayu Muda (KMM) in 1938 led by Ibrahim Yaacob. Kesatuan Melayu Muda (KMM) had been fighting for independence for Malaya to be affiliated with the Republic of Indonesia Raya or Melayu Raya and to set aside the monarchy. However, most of the Malays in Malaya at that time, (circa 1938) did not agree with their cause because the Malays supported the institution of the Malay Rulers and Islam. For the most part, the Malays chose the UMNO struggle to uphold the institution of the Malay Rulers and Islam .

After Kesatuan Melayu Muda (KMM) was banned, the Parti Kebangsaan Melayu Malaya (PKMM) led by Mokhtaruddin Lasso, Dr. Burhanuddin al-Helmy and Ahmad Boestamam continued the ideological struggle. PKMM adopted the Indonesian republican flag as its own.

=== PKMM adoption ===
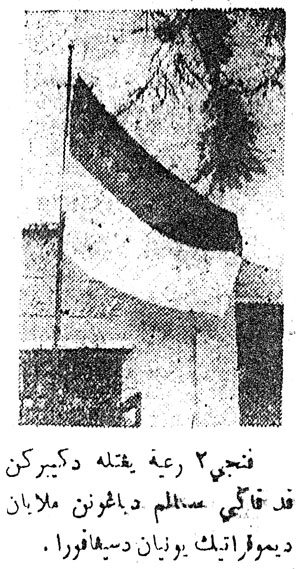
Flag raising ceremony of the Sang Saka Malaya, on December 10, 1947

When the flag was first designed, all was the same with its progenitor, the Indonesian flag. It was later deemed too similar with Indonesia, and a redesign was underway. This led the two Malaysian left-wing organisations, AMCJA and PUTERA, to then redesign to, what was then, an unofficial national flag for Malaya. The decision to make and fly the flag by 10 December. was made at Kuala Lumpur at a meeting early November. Attending were members of PUTERA, The Malay People's Peasants Union, The Malay Enlightened Women's Corps (A.W.A.S.), the All-Malaya Council of Joint Action (AMJA), the Malayan Indian Congress, the Malayan Peoples' Anti-Japanese Army, the Malayan Federation of Trades Unions, and the relatively new Democratic Youth League. The flag was redesigned with the addition to 12 stars on the canton part of the flag, symbolizing the Malayan states (which was then only on peninsular malaysia).

It was then brought by the delegates of PKMM, led by Dr. Burhanuddin al-Helmy, and unveiled to the Asian Regional Conference held at the end of 1947 in New Delhi, India. Initially planned for 10 December 1947, The flag was hoisted for the first time in the Malayan Democratic Union Building, Singapore.

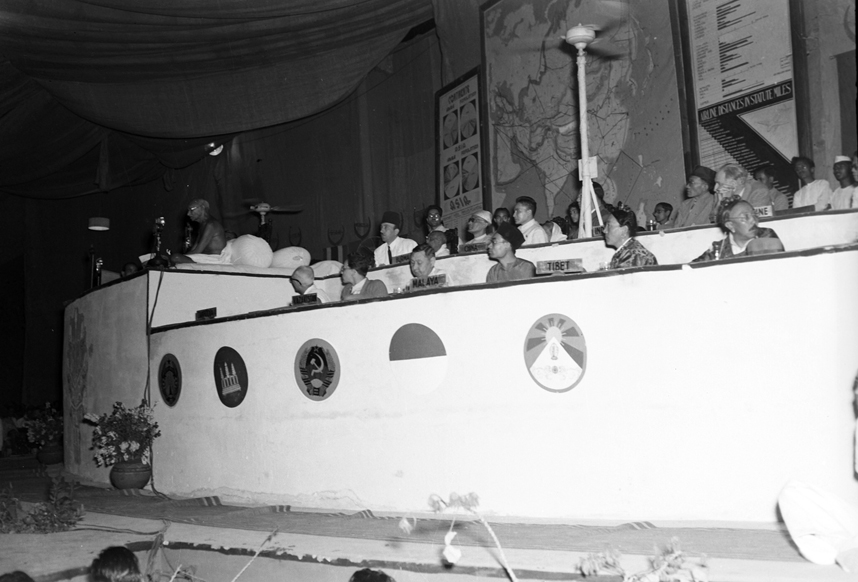
Mahatma Gandhi addressing the closing Plenary Session of the Asian Relations Conference. The emblem shown for Malayan Delegates resembles the Indonesian flag, as this was based on the flag of the Kebangsaan Melayu Malaya (PKMM)

According to blogger Tukar Tiub, Hishamuddin Rais, this flag was later flown during the 1947 Afro-Asian Conference in New Delhi. If he means the Asian-African or Afro-Asian Conference or better known as the Bandung Conference, it is somewhat inaccurate. This is because the first Afro-Asian Conference was held on April 18, 1955 in Bandung, Indonesia. Thus the more accurate is the Asia Regional Conference or Asian Relations Conference at the end of 1947 in New Delhi.

According to the book written by Kamarudin Jaffar, Dr. Burhanuddin Al Helmy: Malay and Islamic politics, Dr Burhanuddin has led the Malayan delegation in this conference. The presence of Dr. Burhanuddin, who holds the position of PKMM Advisor, has opened the opportunity for him to meet and discuss movements against colonialism together with the independence leaders of Asian countries. Based on the sources of information, several conclusions can be made that the flag of the Young Malay Union Association, nicknamed Sang Saka Malaya, was first designed in 1947, but its design was not the same as that carried by the participants in the Promise of Democracy.

=== UMNO's adoption ===
UMNO's Sang Saka Bangsa

During the formalisation of the United Malays National Organization (UMNO), matters regarding the pattern and shape of the UMNO flag were discussed at the 2nd UMNO General Conference on 19 June 1946. This conference was held at the Ipoh Town Hall, Perak Darul Ridzuan. Various patterns and shapes of flags were proposed by the delegates. Each representative was also required to explain the purpose of selecting the pattern and symbols used on the flag they designed. Among the several proposals, there were several flag proposals that really captured the hearts of the delegates. The four flags were as follows.

- 3-colour pattern, green, black and white stripes. Proposed by Dato' Onn, representing the Johor Peninsular Malay Movement.
- 2-colour pattern, red and white flag as in the flag of the Republic of Indonesia. Proposed by the Parti Kebangsaan Melayu Malaya (PKMM)
- 3-colour pattern, red and white flag with a green keris symbol in the middle. Proposed by the Sabak Bernam District Malay Association
- 4-colour pattern, red and white flag, with a yellow circle and a green keris in the middle, as in the current UMNO flag. Proposed by the Kampung Baru Loyalty Alliance, Kuala Lumpur.

After a great debate, there were generally two flags that were chosen by the delegates, the first was the one proposed by the Kampung Baru Loyalty Alliance, Kuala Lumpur, and the second was the flag proposed by PKMM. The council finally voted between these two options. The result was that the flag proposed by the Kampung Baru Loyalty Alliance, Kuala Lumpur narrowly won by only a few votes.

In relation to the red and white flag (the flag of the Republic of Indonesia) as the official UMNO flag, the proposal of the Parti Kebangsaan Melayu Malaya (PKMM) narrowly lost, so PKMM led by Ishak Haji Muhammad, and among others Ahmad Boestamam withdrew and left the UMNO General Meeting. Several delegates from the mother clan were also seen leaving the hall. PKMM was a strong organization, and is considered the core of the 36 organizations that make up UMNO. Its decision to withdraw from UMNO is feared to weaken UMNO. However, the delegates agreed to accept the vote that had been decided, and as a result, the design proposed by the Kampung Baru KL Malay Loyalty Alliance was used as the official UMNO flag until today.

=== Modern usage and incidents ===
In 2007, a derivative of the flag emerged among protesters in Malaysia. Angkatan Muda Keadilan (PKR Youth) leader, Najwan Halimi has claimed he was the designer of a similar flag carried by supporters of Himpunan Janji Demokrasi in 2007. The 2007 design red-white flag features the crescent moon and a star with 11 vertices, whilst the Sang Saka Malaya design announced on 11 November 1947 in Singapore is red and white with 12 yellow stars to represent the 12 states in Malaya.

At midnight on New Year's Eve 2012, a group called "Aktivis Sang Saka" flew the Sang Saka Malaya flag, lofted with a cluster of twelve gas balloons, and then hoisted under the platform of the Masjid Jamek LRT Station above the intersection of Jalan Raja and Jalan Tun Perak, near Dataran Merdeka in the capital of Malaysia, Kuala Lumpur, then taken down by the police 30 minutes later. When questioned by police about half an hour after the incident, one activists, Muhammad Nasir Abu Bakar, said that they were flying the flag to commemorate the Malayan leftist liberation struggle " for transparency and truth."

== Usage ==
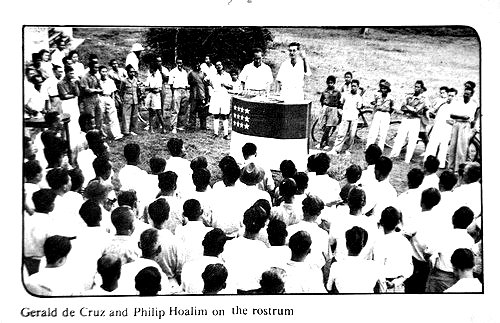
Gerald de Cruz and Philip Hoalim on the rostrum speaking in Singapore.

The Sang Saka Malaya was flag of the Persatuan Kesatuan Melayu Muda (PKMM a.k.a. Malay Youth Association) which was not aligned to Malayan royalty. It was never officially used by a state in Malaysia and it is simply the flag of the PKMM which never bore the inclusion of the sultans in their struggle. According to the Head of the History, Heritage and Socio-Cultural Unit of the Majlis Professor Negara (MPN a.k.a. National Council of Professors), Prof Datuk Dr Zainal Kling, the Sang Saka (with red and white background only) has been used by states in Maritime Southeast Asia since time immemorial. It was not the original Malayan flag.

== Controversy ==
Sang Saka Malaya with an 11-pointed star that was flown in the 2012 Democracy Promise parade.

Variant with 14-pointed star

The issue involving the waving of the Sang Saka Malaya flag started when a group of teenagers who participated in the "Promise of Democracy" parade in conjunction with Malaysia's independence night on August 31, 2012, started waving the flag in public. Simultaneously with the gathering, pamphlets urging the conversion of the Jalur Gemilang to the flag were also distributed. With it, the view that the flying of the flag is a form of ideological threat that wants to change the existing Jalur Gemilang flag arises. Prime Minister Tun Dr Mahathir Mohamad did not reject the possibility that the action of some of the Himpunan Janji Bersih participants in raising another flag to replace Jalur Gemilang had an implicit agenda, as if to acknowledge the dissidents' desire to change the Malaysian system of government to a republic.

"Maybe that's their intention. If the Kesatuan Melayu Muda (KMM) is supported, then that's indeed their intention (to become a republic). I dare not say, but it is a possibility,".

— Tun Dr. Mahathir Mohamad

In addition, some protesters also insulted the country's leaders by stepping on the Prime Minister's photo. These actions were widely condemned by many parties and some even made police reports.

Following the criticism received, the Promise Coalition Committee, Maria Chin Abdullah issued a statement that her party, Bersih, did not give instructions to distribute leaflets changing the Jalur Gemilang to the flag that was waved by a group of teenagers at Dataran Merdeka. In addition, according to Youth Wing Leader of the Angkatan Muda Keadilan (AMK), Shamsul Iskandar Md Akin, the opposition has never discussed the design of the Sang Saka Malaya flag that was redesigned by Najwan Halimi in 2007, who is the Deputy Chief of Information of Angkatan Muda Keadilan (PKR). Shamsul Iskandar described the waving of the flag of Sang Saka Malaya as a manifestation of young people who have bright observations about the history of Nusantara.

According to the Sarawak State Pas Youth Council website there is an entry that describes "the Sang Saka Malaya flag will replace the Jalur Gemilang because it has the characteristics of Nusantaran (Sang Saka) that are not on the Jalur Gemilang"

Then also, the concept or element of the red and white stripes is seen not only in the flags of the republics around Nusantara such as those displayed in the national flags of Indonesia and Singapore, but the element also exists in the official flag of the United Malays National Organization (UMNO), the Malaysian Islamic Party (PAS) and Parti Ikatan Bangsa Malaysia (IKATAN).

== Gallery ==
The Malaysian flag, "Jalur Gemilang," has elements of the red and white. Meaning bravery and purity respectively. Each red and white represents a state in the federation.

The Indonesian Flag, "Sang Saka Merah Putih." Symbolizing bravery and purity respectively.

The Singaporean flag, has elements of the red and white. Meaning unity and purity respectively.

The flag of Malacca has elements of the red and white.

The flag of Sarawak, "Trisakti" had elements of the red and white. Meaning bravery and purity respectively.(1973–1988).

The United Malays National Organization (UMNO) flag, "Sang Saka Bangsa," uses the red and white colors with a yellow moon and a green Kris in it.

Parti Islam Se-Malaysia (PAS) also uses red and white color elements in one version of the official flag.

The Barisan Revolusi Nasional Melayu Patani (BRN) flag has elements of the red and white.

The Brunei People's Party (BPR) flag had elements of the red and white.

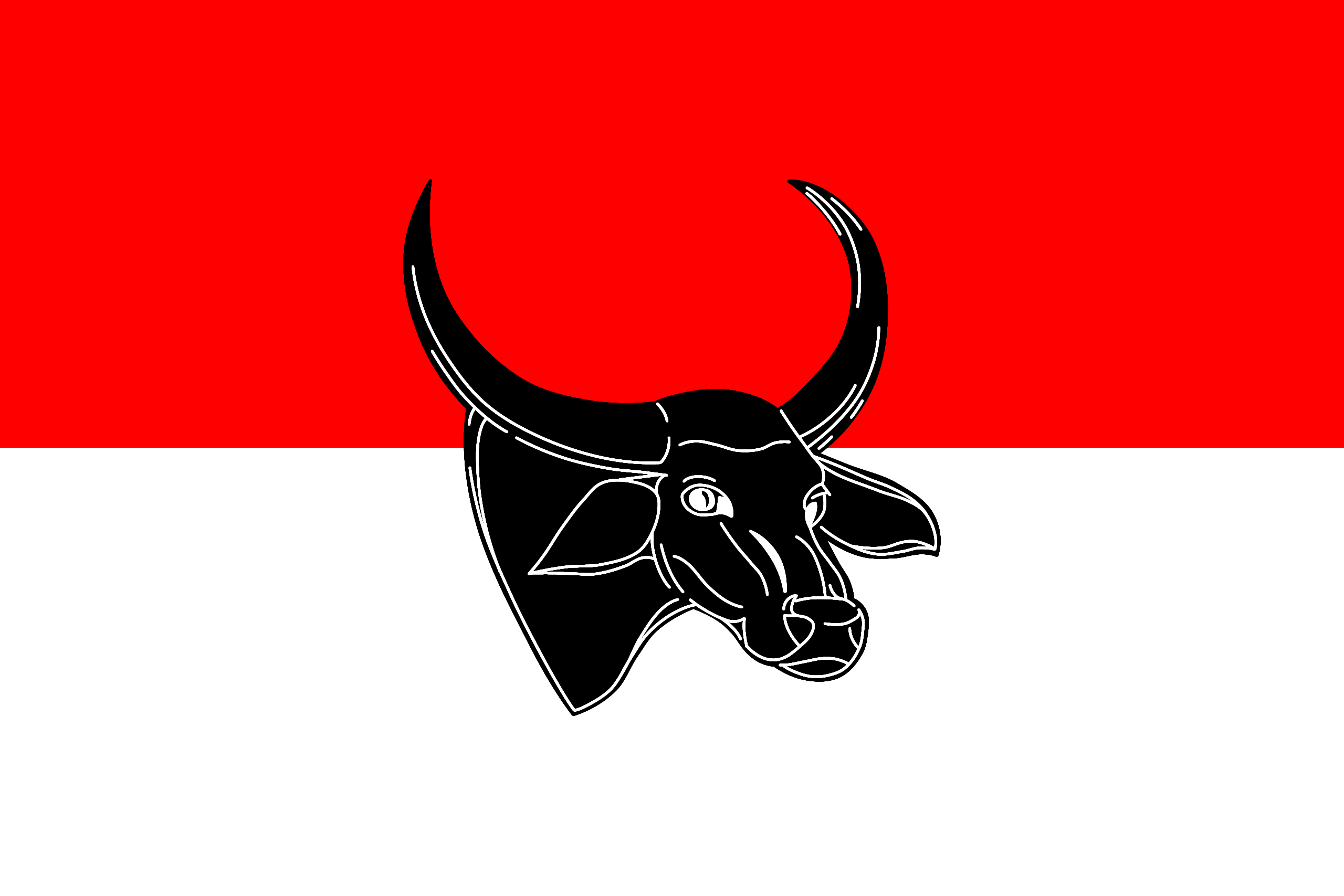
The Perhimpoenan Indonesia flag, the progenitor of all flags used by early Indonesian and Malay nationalists.
