= Parti Kebangsaan Melayu Malaya =

Malay Nationalist Party

Malay Nationalist Party Parti Kebangsaan Melayu Malaya ڤرتي كبڠسأن ملايو ملايا
- Abbreviation: PKMM
- Founder: Mokhtaruddin Lasso
- Founded: 17 October 1945
- Dissolved: 1948
- Preceded by: Kesatuan Melayu Muda
- Succeeded by: Parti Rakyat Malaysia; Labour Party of Malaya; Parti Islam Se-Malaysia; UMNO (left wing)
- Youth wing: Angkatan Pemuda Insaf
- Women's wing: Angkatan Wanita Sedar
- Ideology: Left-wing nationalism Malay nationalism Malay irredentism Socialism; Pancasila; Anti-imperialism
- Political position: Left-wing to far-left
- Colours: Red, white

Sang Saka Malaya

Parti Kebangsaan Melayu Malaya (PKMM), also known as the Malay Nationalist Party, was founded on 17 October 1945 in Ipoh, Perak. The party was the first Malay political party formed after the Japanese occupation of Malaya.

The party was formed by Mokhtaruddin Lasso by the advice of Tan Malaka, an Indonesian socialist revolutionary. The main goal of the PKMM was to achieve full independence for Malaya and to oppose any form of British colonial rule. The five principles adopted by the PKMM were a belief in God, nationalism, sovereignty of the people, universal brotherhood and social justice.

In response to British proposals for a Federation of Malaya, PKMM, as a member of Pusat Tenaga Ra'ayat (PUTERA), formed an alliance with other predominantly non-Malay political groups organized under the All-Malayan Council of Joint Action, forming the AMCJA-PUTERA coalition. Together they formulated an alternative People's Constitutional Proposals which called for a common citizenship and popularly elected government that was ultimately rejected.

The establishment of the Federation of Malaya coupled with British crackdown on the Malay left-wing led the PKMM to disband in 1948, though many of its members would go on to play important roles in Malayan politics.

== History ==
=== Emergence ===
PKMM was established on 17 October 1945 at its inaugural meeting from 16–17 October 1945. Apart from states representatives, present also was a representative from Pattani, Tengku Mahmood Mahyideen and a royal representative of the Sultan of Selangor, Sultan Hishammuddin Abdul Aziz Alam Shah who contributed $50,000. The central committee consisted of:

- Mokhtaruddin Lasso - General Leader
- Dr Burhanuddin Al-Helmy - First Vice Chief
- Baharuddin Tahir@Taharuddin - Second Vice Chair
- Dahari Ali - Secretary
- Zulkifli Auni - Vice Secretary
- Ahmad Boestamam - Youth Chief
- Katijah Ali - Women's Affairs Chief
- Arshad Ashaari - Treasurer
- Salleh - Religious Chief

PKMM's inaugural conference ran from 30 November 1945 to 4 December 1945 and featured a wide variety of activists from diverse backgrounds including communists, royalists, nationalists, Islamic preachers, socialists, students and proponents of Malay culture and customs. The congress agreed that PKMM would be guided by the following goals:

- To unite the Malay race while planting the spirit of nationalism in the minds and hearts of the Malays so as to unite Malaya with the larger family of the Indonesia Raya.
- To advocate freedom in speech, movement, thought and education.
- To reinvigorate the economic status of the Malay race by promoting entrepreneurship and agriculture so as to enhance the Malay quality of life.
- To obtain freedom in cultivating crops. Cultivators should be freed from land taxes and be permitted to sell their harvests in any market.
- To demand that the Malays be provided with national schools where they could study any subjects for free.
- To demand freedom to publish books and teach democracy in order to uplift the state of Malay politics and encourage national among Malays.
- The PKMM would work together in harmony with other races in the country to create a Malayan United Front to achieve independence and prosperity for Malaya as part of the Republic of Indonesia Raya.
- To support the Indonesians in their movement to gain independence.

Mokhtaruddin Lasso's decision to leave Malaya for Indonesia in 1946 saw Burhanuddin Al-Helmy assume the position of party leader. The new leadership was organised as follows:

- Burhanuddin Al-Helmy - General Leader
- Ishak Haji Muhammad (Pak Sako) - Vice Chief
- Zulkifli Auni - Secretary
- M. Maza - Vice Secretary
- Baharuddin Tahir@Taharuddin - Treasurer
- Ahmad Boestamam - Youth Chief
- Shamsuddin Salleh - Social Activities

As of 1947 the party recorded 53,380 members with its strongholds in Perak and Pahang.

State	Total Number of Members	Level of Activism
Perak	13350	High
Pahang	7100	High
Terengganu	5560	High
Malacca	4970	High
Selangor	4950	High
Penang	3600	High
Kelantan	3080	Moderate
Singapore	2740	High
Negeri Sembilan	2620	Moderate
Seberang Perai	1640	Moderate
Johor	1530	Low
Perlis	920	Low

Tensions between Burhanuddin Al-Helmy and youth leader Ahmad Boestamam, who advocated radical actions to challenge colonial rule led to establishment of separate women's and youth wings. Angkatan Pemuda Insaf (API) formed the radical youth wing of the party led by Ahmad Boestamam whilst Angkatan Wanita Sedar (AWAS) formed the women's wing of the party led by Shamisah Fakeh.

== Aftermath ==
With the British declaration of Emergency in 1948 and a crackdown on parties of the Malay Left and the MCP the ability of the PKMM to operate was much reduced. API was the first organisation to be banned and nationalist leaders such as Ahmad Boestamam, Ishak Haji Muhammad, Katijah Sidek and Burhanuddin Al-Helmy were imprisoned. In the aftermath, PKMM activism splintered. Some retired from political activity altogether, others sought to generate political change from within UMNO itself, with former KMM and PKMM member Mustapha Hussein losing to Tunku Abdul Rahman by one vote in the contest for the Chairmanship of UMNO.

Other PKMM members who emerged in UMNO were Ghafar Baba and Aishah Ghani.

Others such as Shamsiah Fakeh, Wahi Anuwar and Musa Ahmad fled to the jungles and joined the Communist Party of Malaya and its guerilla war against the British. Another leftist PKMM member Kamarulzaman Teh became Malaysia's longest-serving political detainee.

Still more leaders would go onto found or lead other nationalist, socialist or Islamist political parties. Thus upon their release Ahmad Boestamam would found the Parti Rakyat whilst Ishak Haji Muhammad would found the Labour Party.

Burhanuddin Al-Helmy would go onto lead the Parti Islam Se-Malaysia from 1956 to his death in 1969. He was succeeded as PAS president by another prominent former PKMM leader Asri Muda.

== See also ==
- Kesatuan Melayu Muda
- Rukun 13

== Sources ==
- Amoroso, Donna (2014) Traditionalism and the Ascendancy of the Malay Ruling Class in Colonial Malaya, Petaling Jaya: SIRD
- Ariffin Omar (2015) Bangsa Melayu: Malay Concepts of Democracy and Community 1945-1950, Second Edition, Petaling Jaya: SIRD
- Mustapha Hussain (2004) Malay Nationalism before UMNO: The Memoirs of Mustapha Hussain, Singapore: NUS Press
- Noor, Farish (2015) The Malaysian Islamic Party PAS 1951-2013: Islamism in a Mottled Nation, Petaling Jaya: SIRD
- Shamsiah Fakeh (2009) The Memoirs of Shamsiah Fakeh: From AWAS to 10th Regiment, Petaling Jaya: SIRD
