= Sakinah Junid =

Puan Sri Datin Seri Panglima Sakinah Junid (10 October 1922 – 7 September 2004) was the long-serving Dewan Muslimat's Chief of Pan-Malaysian Islamic Party (PAS) for twenty years ranging from 1963–1983. She is married to PAS leader Asri Muda.

== Education ==
She studied at Perguruan Diniyyah Puteri Padang Panjang, West Sumatra, Indonesia as schools that formed the mindset and personality of leaders through the process of "propagation and overreach - dakwah and tarbiah" that eventually made her a leader.

== Woman activism ==
Sakinah Junid was actively involved in Angkatan Wanita Sedar (AWAS) (Conscious Women's Front), the first nationalist women's organisation in Malaysia. It was established in late 1945 as women's wing of the Malay Nationalist Party (Malay: Partai Kebangsaan Melayu Malaya, PKMM). The organisation was also led by Shamsiah Fakeh. At its peak, AWAS had a membership of 2000 women. The group organised, held discussions and hosted Indonesian women visitors. AWAS members, led by Sakinah Junid, participated in a six-mile protest march against the British prohibition disallowing the use of motorised vehicles in processions.

She first led the Angkatan Wanita Sedar (AWAS) Padang Rengas Branch when she was 23 years old. She led a group of 300 young people from the Angkatan Pemuda Insaf (API) (API) and women of Angkatan Wanita Sedar (AWAS) who marched from Padang Rengas to Kuala Kangsar. "

Along with Shamsiah Fakeh and Tan Sri Aishah Ghani she among the first female leader involved in the struggle against colonialism and the struggle for independence. She is among the founders of Angkatan Wanita Sedar (AWAS). Anthropologist Wazir Jahan Karim attributes the impetus for the creation of AWAS to the core leaders of the organisation: Aishah Ghani, Sakinah Junid and Shamsiah Fakeh.

== Politics ==
Early on, her work in the Pan-Malaysian Islamic Party (PAS) was through the female wing, known as Dewan Muslimat since its existence in 1953. After ten years, Sakinah Junid took the leadership of this wing for 20 years. Sakinah Junid was known for her fiery speeches and raising the spirits of the listeners.

Sakinah Junid nearly retired from politics at the age of 70. She spent the rest of her life as a mother of 10 children, grandchildren and great-grandchildren. She suffered from pneumonia and finally died on 7 September 2004 at the age of 81. She and was buried in the Muslim cemetery in Sungai Tangkas.
