= Jamaliah Jamaluddin =

Malaysian politician

Yang Berhormat Puan Jamaliah Jamaluddin MLA
- 嘉玛莉亚 / جمالية جمال الدين

Member of the Selangor State Executive Council
- Incumbent
- Assumed office 21 August 2023
- Monarch: Sharafuddin
- Menteri Besar: Amirudin Shari
- Portfolio: Public Health, Environment, Climate Change and Green Technology (Note: Assumed portfolios on 23 August 2023.)
- Preceded by: Siti Mariah Mahmud (Health); Hee Loy Sian (Environment, Climate Change and Green Technology)
- Constituency: Bandar Utama

Member of the Selangor State Legislative Assembly for Bandar Utama
- Incumbent
- Assumed office 9 May 2018
- Preceded by: Position established
- Majority: 34,679 (2018); 35,446 (2023)

State Treasurer of the Democratic Action Party of Selangor
- Incumbent
- Assumed office 10 November 2024
- Deputy: Rajiv Rishyakaran
- Secretary-General: Anthony Loke Siew Fook
- Preceded by: Ong Kian Ming

Personal details
- Born: Jamaliah Jamaluddin; 16 March 1989 (age 37) Hunan, China
- Citizenship: Malaysian
- Party: Democratic Action Party (DAP)
- Other political affiliations: Pakatan Harapan (PH)
- Parent: Jamaluddin Ibrahim
- Relatives: Shamsiah Fakeh (Grandmother)
- Education: Northwood University
- Occupation: Politician
- Website: https://www.jamaliahjamaluddin.com

Jamaliah Jamaluddin (born 16 March 1989; Jawi: جمالية جمال الدين; Chinese: 嘉玛莉亚; pinyin: Jiāmǎ Lìyà) is a Malaysian politician who has served as Member of the Selangor State Executive Council (EXCO) in the Pakatan Harapan (PH) state administration under Menteri Besar Amirudin Shari since August 2023 and Member of the Selangor State Legislative Assembly (MLA) for Bandar Utama since May 2018. She is a member of the Democratic Action Party (DAP), a component party of the PH coalition, presently the youngest Selangor EXCO Member and one of the only two female Selangor EXCO Members alongside Anfaal Saari.

== Early life ==
Jamaliah was born on 16 March 1989 in Hunan, China. She grew up in the Klang Valley and was the only child in the family. Her political interest was sparked in her teenage years, partly influenced by her father, Jamaluddin Ibrahim, who himself was a radio host and avid columnist at the time. Jamaliah's grandmother was Shamsiah Fakeh, a prominent Malaysian nationalist, feminist, and veteran leader of Angkatan Wanita Sedar (AWAS).

Jamaliah graduated with a First Class Diploma in Business Studies from the Management & Science University Malaysia (MSU). She continued her studies at Northwood University in Midland, Michigan, United States, majoring in International Business, where she obtained a First Class bachelor's degree in Business Studies and the honour of a Magna Cum Laude.

== Early political career ==
Jamaliah began her involvement in politics when she started volunteering for the Democratic Action Party (DAP) in 2015. In 2016, she was chosen to become a Local Councillor under Petaling Jaya City Council (MBPJ), as well as the special assistant to the then Assemblywoman for Damansara Utama, Yeo Bee Yin, serving in both positions until 2018. Jamaliah holds the post of Selangor Vice Chief & was formerly the National Vice-Treasurer for DAP Socialist Youth (DAPSY) from 2018 until 2021. She also holds a party position as a DAP Selangor State Committee Member.

== Selangor State Legislative Assembly ==
=== Elections ===
==== 2018 ====
In 2018, Jamaliah was fielded for the first time to contest on a DAP ticket under the Bandar Utama constituency for the Selangor State Assembly in the 14th General Elections, where she won 90.4% of the constituents’ votes with a 38,561 majority, making her one of the youngest representatives to be elected into the Selangor State Assembly.

==== 2023 ====
Jamaliah was re-elected in 2023 with 84.9% of the votes with a 35,446 majority in a 3-corner electoral race against Abe Lim from MUDA and Nur Alif Mohd Tafid from Perikatan Nasional.

=== Tenure ===
Following her election in 2018, Jamaliah expressed her main priorities to be the tackling of racial issues, and the empowerment of youths.

==== State Executive Council Member ====
In her second term, Jamaliah was appointed a Member of the Selangor State Executive Council as part of Amirudin Shari's second Executive Council. She would oversee the Public Health, and Environment, Climate Change and Green Technology portfolio.

== Election results ==
Selangor State Legislative Assembly
Year	Constituency	Candidate	Votes	Pct	Opponent(s)	Votes	Pct	Ballots cast	Majority	Turnout
2018	N36 Bandar Utama	Jamaliah Jamaluddin (DAP)	38,561	90.45%	Ch'Ng Soo Chau (MCA)	3,882	9.11%	42,631	34,679	83.65%
2018	N36 Bandar Utama	Jamaliah Jamaluddin (DAP)	38,561	90.45%	Chong Fook Meng (IND)	188	0.44%	42,631	34,679	83.65%
2023	N36 Bandar Utama	Jamaliah Jamaluddin (DAP)	39,845	85.25%	Nur Alif Mohd Tafid (Gerakan)	4,399	9.41%	46,913	35,446	64.23%
2023	N36 Bandar Utama	Jamaliah Jamaluddin (DAP)	39,845	85.25%	Abe Lim Hooi Sean (MUDA)	2,496	5.34%	46,913	35,446	64.23%
