= Fong Chong Pik =

Political activist and member of the Communist Party of Malaya (CPM)

Fong Chong Pik (simplified Chinese: 方壮壁; traditional Chinese: 方壯壁; pinyin: Fāng Zhuàngbì; 1924 – 6 February 2004), also known as Fang Chuang Pi, was a Singaporean political activist and guerilla fighter for the Malayan Communist Party (MCP). He joined the MCP while working as a reporter for Nan Chiau Jit Pao in the 1950s. He had several meetings with Lee Kuan Yew, but these were unproductive and he was banned from Singapore.

== Early life ==
Fong Chong Pik, also known as Fang Chuang Pi, was born in China around 1926. His sister Fung Yin Ching later served in the Legislative Assembly of Singapore as a member of the People's Action Party (PAP). At age six his family moved to the Colony of Singapore and he was educated at the Shu Qin Primary School in Bukit Timah. He entered the Chinese High School in 1939, but did not graduate until 1947 due to World War II. After graduating he worked as a student discipline officer at the Chinese High School for a year and then became a teacher at Sin Ming Primary School.

== Career ==
Fong became a reporter for Nan Chiau Jit Pao in 1950, and covered court cases for the newspaper. He joined the Malayan Communist Party (MCP) during his time at the newspaper and started editing Freedom News, a communist newspaper.

The British raided Nan Chiau Jit Poh's office in September 1950, and Fong went into hiding. A reward of 2,000 Malayan dollars was issued for his arrest. The offices of Freedom News was raided in 1951, but Fong eluded arrest again. Fong was the highest-ranking MCP leader in Singapore.

In 1957, Fong left for Jakarta and met with Eu Chooi Yip in order to plan the reconstruction of the MCP in Singapore. Fong was tasked with contacting Lee Kuan Yew about the possibility of creating a united front between the MCP and PAP. Lew and Fong made contact in 1958, and met four times before the 1959 election. Fong pushed for Lee to abolish the Internal Security Council, but Lee refused. Their last meeting was held in 1961.

Fong fled Singapore after the 1962 integration referendum, but continued to direct MCP actions from the Riau Islands. On 25 September 1963, Lee announced that he would reveal Fong's identity to the Malaysian government, which Singapore recently merged into.

== Later life ==
Fong and 44 other MCP members fled to Indonesia in 1963. He later moved to Thailand sometime by 1977, and was a member of the 12th Detachment, a MCP guerrilla force. He went by the name Lee Ping during this time. The Hat Yai Peace Agreement ended the MCP's military activities on 2 December 1989.

Fong married Zheng Hong Ying, with whom he had one son. However, their son did not see them after 1970, and was sent to live in Hunan with the children of other MCP members.

Fong was banned from entering Singapore in 1966, and made several unsuccessful requests to be allowed to return. He was allowed a one-week visit in August 1995, in order to pay respects to his dead parents. Fong died in Hat Yai, Thailand, on 6 February 2004.

== Works cited ==
=== Books ===
- Loh, Kah; Liao, Edgar; Lim, Cheng; Seng, Guo-Quan (2012). The University Socialist Club and the Contest for Malaya: Tangled Strands of Modernity. Amsterdam University Press. ISBN 9789048515899. JSTOR j.ctt46n1s0.

=== Web ===
- Kok, Jaime. "Fong Chong Pik". National Library Board. Archived from the original on 14 July 2025.
