= Musa Ahmad =

Malaysian researcher (1921–1993)

Musa Ahmad (1921–1993) was a former chairman of the Communist Party of Malaya.

He joined the party in 1946 and took part in its armed struggle, also spending many years in China.

In November 1980 he and his wife Zainab Mahmud surrendered to the government of Malaysia. He then returned to his home in Kampung Pari, Ipoh and spent the 1980s engaged in anti-CPM propaganda, urging his former comrades to surrender.

== Early life ==
Musa was born in Kampung Pari near Ipoh, Perak in 1921. He attended the Sekolah Kebangsaan Pengkalan Baru in Gopeng until standard 6 before furthering his studies at the Sekolah Al-Mashoor religious school in Penang during the 1930s.

In the struggle against the Japanese occupiers during the Second World War and later the British colonial powers, Musa was drawn to the Parti Kebangsaan Melayu Malaya.

== Communist Party leader ==
He then joined the Communist Party of Malaya in 1946, and was the founding leader of a peasants group Barisan Tani Malaya. In the late 1940s, he became one of the founding leaders of the CPM's 10th regiment which was formed by the party's Malay members. Other leaders included Abdullah CD and Wahi Annuar. According to Musa, Abdullah was the commander, Wahi was the deputy commander and he himself was the political officer.

Although he was not chosen to represent the Communist Party at the Baling peace talks in 1955, he was selected as party chairman soon after.

The CPM's Central Committee decided to send him to Beijing for further studies. He arrived at Beijing with his wife and infant daughter in August 1956, where they were accommodated in the Institute of Marx and Lenin.

In 1968, Musa was removed as CPM chairman by the party's secretary-general Chin Peng. From 1969 to 1974 he lived in Beijing, China doing propaganda work for Radio Peking.

== Surrender ==
In November 1980, Musa and Zainab surrendered to the Malaysian authorities.

In subsequent years he gave a number of interviews to the media recounting his experiences and urging his former comrades to surrender and live in Malaysia. He said that Malay members in the CPM were manipulated and marginalised. He also said that he had returned to the Islamic faith.

In 1981, Musa claimed that CPM women's leader Shamsiah Fakeh had committed infanticide during World War II by killing her child while in the jungle to avoid capture.

Shamsiah subsequently denied the allegation in her memoirs and explained that she was convinced by fellow guerillas to give the child away to local villagers to be raised upon entering an unfamiliar district.

== Death ==
After the CPM itself gave up its armed struggle, Musa ceased to give interviews and lived quietly in Perak. He reportedly died in 1993 at the age of 72.
