= Hu Zhongchi =

Chinese journalist and writer

Hu Zhongchi (1900-1968) was born in Fenghui Town, Shangyu, East China's Zhejiang province. He was a Chinese journalist and writer.

== Life and career ==
Hu Zhongchi was born in Fenghui Town, Shangyu, East China's Zhejiang province. In 1919, he entered Ningbo Xiaoshi High School, and was influenced by the May Fourth Movement. He co-edited Self-Help Weekly with his classmates. In 1921, he passed the examination for the Shanghai Post Office and soon became a journalist for the Sin Wan Pao. One year later, he became an editor for the Commercial Journal and was responsible for organizing and publicizing the masses after the May Thirtieth Movement. He and his older brother Hu Yuzhi helped young people from Shangyu to compile and print the Shangyu Voice in Shanghai and joined the literary research association initiated by Mao Dun. In 1928, he joined the Shen Bao and was successively promoted to the night editor and chief editor of the international edition. He was known as one of the "Shen Bao Four Scholars".

When the Anti-Japanese War broke out in 1937 and the Japanese army occupied Shanghai, he stayed in the Shanghai Concession and co-founded The News Digest, The News Digest Weekly, Collection, and reprinted Mao Zedong's On Protracted War, On the New Stage, and The Complete Works of Lu Xun. He also translated and published Edgar Snow's Red Star Over China and Inside Red China. In 1939, he was arrested twice by the Shanghai Concession authorities and was bailed out by the underground Chinese Communist Party (CCP). In 1940, he was wanted by the Japanese puppet authorities and fled to Hong Kong, where he worked successively for the International News Agency and the Hua Shang Daily. Later, he served as the general affairs director of the Guilin Writers Association, the chief editor of the Guangxi Daily (Zhaoping Edition), and the chief editor of the Modern, a semi-monthly magazine in Guangzhou. During the Chinese Civil War, he fled to Hong Kong again and worked as a special correspondent for the Singapore Nan Chiau Jit Pao.

After the founding of the People's Republic of China, he participated in the takeover of news units in Shanghai. In 1952, he joined the CCP and successively served as a member of the editorial board and head of the international department of the Shanghai Liberation Daily, director of the information room of the international department of the People's Daily, deputy director of the editorial department of the Foreign Languages Press, and a researcher at the Asia-Africa Research Institute. He was also one of the main contributors to the magazine World Knowledge from its founding.

Hu was proficient in English, Russian, Japanese, German, Sanskrit, Esperanto and several other languages.

He died in 1968.

== Authorship ==
In 1919, Hu Zhongchi began to publish. He joined the Chinese Writers Association in 1952. His main works are:

Translations of Frau Sorge, The Story of World Literature, The Good Earth, Remembering Lenin, The Moon is Down, Training in Literary Appreciation, A Collection of Soviet Novels, The Grapes of Wrath, Tragicomedy in the Forest and Mother, a Gorky novel that he co-translated.

He also edited A Brief History of World Literature, Thirty-Two Landscapes of the World, and The World's Great Metropolises.

Hu Zhongchi wrote On World Customs, which was published by the Shanghai Guanghua Bookstore in July 1926, and Thirty-Two Landscapes of the World, which was published by Shanghai Kaiming Bookstore in December 1946.
