= Abe Lim =

Malaysian environmental advocate and entrepreneur

- 林慧娴
- Born: June 15, 1996 (age 30); Ipoh, Perak, Malaysia
- Education: Oxford Brookes University (LLB); University of Oxford (MSc); Stanford University Graduate School of Business (Exec. Ed.)
- Occupations: Environmental lawyer; Entrepreneur; Activist; Politician
- Known for: Environmental activism, MUDA candidate for Bandar Utama in the 2023 Selangor state election, Founder of Abe Archive Books
- Notable work: Abe Lim & Others v. Government of Malaysia (2026): Lim is the lead plaintiff in a historic, youth-led climate lawsuit filed in the High Court of Malaya. The legal action challenges the Malaysian government's failure to uphold its 1992 Rio Earth Summit pledge to maintain a minimum of 50 percent of the nation's total land area under natural forest cover.
- Political party: MUDA
- Movement: Mana Hutan Kami
- Board member of: ClientEarth Next Generation Board

Abe Lim Hooi Sean (Chinese: 林慧娴; pinyin: Lín Huì Xián), commonly known as Abe (/ˈæb.i/) Lim, is a Malaysian environmental activist, lawyer, entrepreneur, and politician. She gained recognition during her 2023 political campaign. She founded the plastic-upcycling business Purpose Plastics and the venture studio Responsible Projects Ventures, and has served as co-chair of ClientEarth's Next Generation Board.

Lim contested the Bandar Utama seat in the 2023 Selangor state election as a candidate for the Malaysian United Democratic Alliance (MUDA). In 2026, she was part of a group of Malaysians who filed a judicial review application concerning the Malaysian government's commitment to maintain at least 50 per cent of the country's land area under forest cover.

== Early life and education ==
Lim was born and raised in Ipoh, Perak. She gained early business experience in her family's petrochemical company before pursuing ventures focused on environmental and social impact. In interviews, she has described her exposure to industry, alongside community activities encouraged by her mother, as influences on her interest in the relationship between economic development and environmental protection.

In 2020, Lim began reading law at Oxford Brookes University in the United Kingdom, where she became involved with environmental organisations and climate-related advocacy. During her studies, she served as treasurer of Public Interest Environmental Law UK (PIEL UK) in 2021 and undertook a student placement at Oxford Magistrates' Court. She graduated with a Bachelor of Laws in 2023. She also completed an executive business programme at the Stanford Graduate School of Business.

In 2021, she was among a group of youth participants associated with the 16th UN Climate Change Conference of Youth (COY16) and attended COP26 as a IPCC keynote speaker.

Lim is currently reading for an MSc in Sustainable Urban Development at the University of Oxford, where she is a member of Reuben College. Her academic interests encompass environmental justice, urban governance and relationships between people and nature, particularly in Southeast Asia.

== Environmental work ==
=== Purpose Plastics ===
Lim established Purpose Plastics in March 2021 as a company focused on repurposing plastic waste into household and lifestyle products. The company was developed following Lim's research into plastic waste generated during the COVID-19 pandemic and challenges in Malaysia's recycling system.

Purpose Plastics also conducted public environmental education activities. In connection with COP26, it worked with Malaysia's then Ministry of Environment and Water on a workshop explaining climate science and the findings of the Intergovernmental Panel on Climate Change.

=== Environmental law and policy ===
Lim's environmental work has included legal and policy consultancy on plastics with the United Nations Environment Programme. Through ClientEarth's Next Generation Board, she has contributed to strategic planning, policy development and fundraising. BURO identified her as the board's co-chair in 2023, a role also recorded by the UN Global Compact Network Malaysia & Brunei in 2025.

=== International climate engagement ===
In October 2022, Lim was one of five crew members facilitating the Running Out of Time climate relay from Glasgow to Sharm el-Sheikh for COP27. The 24-hour relay passed through 18 countries, carrying a message calling for wider access to climate education.

=== Climate communication and filmmaking ===
Lim's communication work includes public discussions on climate policy, sustainability and environmental accountability.

Through Anthropocene Media, Lim is the Malaysian collaborator on a British Council-supported storytelling project publicly listed as Shared Ground. The collaboration with Alice Aedy of Earthrise Studio explores the relationships between extractive economies, communities, land and nature through documentary and digital storytelling.

== Political activity ==
In July 2023, MUDA announced Lim as its candidate for the Bandar Utama constituency in the 2023 Selangor state election.

Lim made environmental and urban planning issues a significant part of her campaign. Her campaign was notable for being Malaysia's first fully climate-focused political platforms. She advocated strongly for people-first urban planning, robust public transit, and actively opposed mega-highway projects. Part of Lim's campaign also included opposing the proposed Petaling Jaya Dispersal Link Expressway (PJD Link).

Lim contested against incumbent Jamaliah Jamaluddin of the Democratic Action Party and Nur Alif Mohd Tafid of Gerakan. Jamaliah retained the seat with 39,845 votes. Lim received 2,496 votes, or 5.34 per cent of the valid votes cast.

== Election results ==
Selangor State Legislative Assembly
Year	Constituency	Candidate	Votes	Pct	Opponent(s)	Votes	Pct	Ballots cast	Majority	Turnout
2023	N36 Bandar Utama	Abe Lim Hooi Sean (MUDA)	2,496	5.34%	Jamaliah Jamaluddin (DAP)	39,845	85.25%	47,001	35,446	64.35%
2023	N36 Bandar Utama	Abe Lim Hooi Sean (MUDA)	2,496	5.34%	Nur Aliff Mohd Tafid (GERAKAN)	4,399	9.41%	47,001	35,446	64.35%

== Climate litigation ==
=== Mana Hutan Kami litigation ===
On 28 February 2026, Lim and five other Malaysians filed an application for judicial review against the Minister of Natural Resources and Environmental Sustainability and the Government of Malaysia. The application concerns the government's commitment to maintaining at least 50 per cent of Malaysia's land area under forest cover, first articulated at the 1992 Rio Earth Summit.

The applicants seek declarations and orders requiring government action to uphold that commitment. Their arguments concern constitutional rights to life and equality, legitimate expectation and the public trust doctrine. The government has opposed the application on grounds including the applicants' legal standing and the courts' jurisdiction over forestry policy.

The proceedings are associated with the ManaHutanKami campaign. Lim discussed the case with the applicants' lawyer, Lim Wei Jiet, on BFM 89.9 in April 2026. As of October 2026, a decision on whether the application could proceed was scheduled for 9 December 2026.

== Cultural initiatives ==
=== Abe Archive Books ===
Lim founded Abe Archive Books, an independent bookshop and cultural space in Ipoh. Its advertised programme has included discussions on media and public affairs, including The Politics of Storytelling, which featured Lim alongside journalists and advocates and an investigative-journalism workshop led by Ian Yee.

The bookshop was also listed as a screening venue for the November 2026 Palestine Cinema Days programme.

== See also ==
- Climate change in Malaysia
- Environmental issues in Malaysia
- 2023 Selangor state election
- Malaysian United Democratic Alliance
- Climate litigation
