= Shamsiah Fakeh =

Malaysian politician

- Born: 1924; Kampung Gemuruh, Kuala Pilah, Negeri Sembilan, Federated Malay States, British Malaya (now Malaysia)
- Died: 20 October 2008 (aged 83–84); Kuchai Lama, Kuala Lumpur, Malaysia
- Resting place: Sungai Besi Muslim Cemetery, Kuala Lumpur, Malaysia
- Other name: Ratu Rimba (Malay for 'Queen of the Jungle')
- Known for: Resisting the British colonial occupation during the Malayan Emergency. Leader of the Angkatan Wanita Sedar. Prominent member of the Malayan Communist Party.
- Relatives: Jamaliah Jamaluddin (granddaughter)

Shamsiah Fakeh (1924 – 20 October 2008) was a Malaysian nationalist and feminist. She was the leader of Angkatan Wanita Sedar (AWAS), Malaysia's first nationalist women organisation and a prominent Malay leader of the Communist Party of Malaya (CPM). She was the grandmother of Jamaliah Jamaluddin, Member of the Selangor State Executive Council and Member of the Selangor State Legislative Assembly for Bandar Utama.

== Early life ==
Shamsiah was born in the village of Kampung Gemuruh near the town of Kuala Pilah, Negeri Sembilan. She had her early education in the Madrasah Aliah Islaiah (also known as the Islamic High School) in Pelangai, Negeri Sembilan and was later sent to the Madrasah Tuddimiah in Padang Panjang, Sumatera in what was then the Dutch East Indies. It was during this time that she came under the influence of Lebai Maadah, an influential scholar and Islamic reformer.

=== Family life ===
Shamsiah was married five times from the age of 17. Her first husband, Yasin Kina, abandoned her while she was pregnant with their second child and both children died in their infancy. Her second husband, J. M. Rusdi, was eventually discovered to be an informer for the Japanese forces then occupying Malaya.

She was also briefly married to Ahmad Boestamam, the leader of PKMM's youth wing, Angkatan Pemuda Insaf (Awakened Youth Organisation; API). In her memoirs, she claimed that her marriage with Boestamam broke down due to her disagreement with the latter's decision to pay a fine to avoid a jail sentence for publishing a book deemed seditious by government in 1947. Notably the marriage was never mentioned in any of Boestamam's memoirs and writings.

Her fourth husband, Wahi Annuar, was a fellow CPM member who was captured by British and imprisoned. Shamsiah was told that he had surrendered and thought he was dead. He was, in fact, imprisoned for 15 years and eventually died in 1980.

Her final marriage was to another CPM member, Ibrahim Mohamad, in 1956. They remained married until his death in 2006.

== Political activism ==
=== Early involvement ===
As a fiery orator, Shamsiah was scouted by both the United Malays National Organisation and the Malay Nationalist Party (Malay: Partai Kebangsaan Melayu Malaya, PKMM), the main Malay political parties in the post-war period. She eventually chose to join PKMM because she believed it was more dedicated to the struggle for Malaya's independence whereas she considered UMNO a puppet of the British. In 1946, she was asked to lead PKMM's women's wing, Angkatan Wanita Sedar (Cohort of Awakened Women; AWAS).

=== Armed struggle ===
With the banning of the PKMM, API and AWAS in 1948 prior to the declaration of the Malayan Emergency followed by the mass arrests of left leaning Malay nationalists, Shamsiah retreated to the jungles and joined the predominantly Malay 10th Regiment of the Malayan People's Liberation Army of the CPM operating from Lubok Kawah near Temerloh, Pahang. When the 10th Regiment was forced to retreat together with the 11th and 12th Regiment to the Thai-Malaya border in 1953 after a series of military defeats beginning with the Battle of Padang Piul in 1949, Shamsiah joined the retreat and continued to fight as a guerilla until she was sent to China for further education together with her husband, Ibrahim Mohamad, in 1956.

=== Exile ===
The couple remained in China and served as broadcasters with Radio Peking's Malay language service airing propaganda broadcasts via shortwave to Malaya. In 1965, they were assigned by the party to Indonesia to set up a legation office of the Malayan National Liberation League. Their stint was, however, short lived as they were arrested later that year due to the anti-communist purges in Indonesia in the aftermath of the 30 September Movement. They remained imprisoned until 1967 when they obtained their freedom through the mediation of the embassy of the Democratic Republic of Vietnam and obtained passage via Vietnam back to China.

As a result of faction politics within the CPM and the chaos that resulted from the Cultural Revolution in China during the period, Shamsiah and her husband became increasingly estranged from the party's Secretary General, Chin Peng. Both Shamsiah and her husband were expelled from the party in 1972. As they were unable to return to Malaysia (established in 1963 with the federation of Malaya, Singapore, British North Borneo, and Sarawak), they settled in the town of Xiangtan, Hunan and were assigned to work in a steel factory. She also served as a Malay language consultant with Radio Beijing and the Beijing Foreign Languages Institute.

== Return to Malaysia ==
Shamsiah and her family applied to the Malaysian government for permission to return to the country from 1985 onwards. Following the terms of the 1989 peace agreement signed between the CPM and the Government of Malaysia in Hat Yai, Thailand, permission was finally granted on 23 July 1994 and Shamsiah returned along with her husband, their three sons and their four grandchildren. Upon their arrival, the family was met by Special Branch officers who took them to a resort and for about 10 days, they were debriefed and briefed on the local customs and political scenario in Malaysia. One of the conditions for the family's return was a bar on participation in politics and for the first few years upon their return, Shamsiah was not even allowed to participate in academic speaking engagements. Her Chinese daughters-in-law were initially barred entry into the country but were eventually granted permanent residency.

Her memoirs were first published in 2004 by Universiti Kebangsaan Malaysia (UKM) but was immediately suppressed by the authorities and withdrawn from circulation. A new edition as well as a Chinese language translation was published in 2007 by the Strategic Information and Research Development Centre (SIRD) which saw UKM reintroduce their edition into the market.

On April 15, 2026, her publisher Gerakbudaya announced that the memoir was once again being banned, a move that was widely criticised. Her granddaughter Jamaliah expressed disappointment and pointed out that the book had been in circulation for close to 20 years.

A week later Home Minister Saifuddin Nasution announced that the ban on Shamsiah’s book would be revoked.

== Death ==
Following a stroke in 1999, Shamsiah had generally been in poor health and was bedridden by 2007. She died on 20 October 2008 at the residence of her son, Jamaluddin Ibrahim (father of Jamaliah Jamaluddin), due to respiratory failure and was buried at the Sungai Besi Muslim cemetery at 5.30pm of the same day.

Present at the funeral were some prominent politicians including the deputy president of Parti Keadilan Rakyat, Syed Husin Ali, and Democratic Action Party Member of Parliament, Tony Pua.

== Controversies ==
In 1981, the defected chairman of the CPM, Musa Ahmad, claimed that Shamsiah had committed infanticide by killing her third child while in the jungle to avoid capture.

She subsequently denied the allegation in her memoirs and explained that she was convinced by fellow guerillas to give the child away to local villagers to be raised upon entering an unfamiliar district. It was only later that she discovered that the child had in fact been killed. The Japanese was raiding the whole village in an attempt to find her child, and threatened to behead everyone in the village if the child is found hidden by one of the villagers. There was no way to hide the crying child, so it was killed by one of the villagers by drowning, and the Japanese never found it.
