= Lim Kean Chye =

Malaysian lawyer and politician (1919–2023)

- Born: 22 December 1919; Penang, Straits Settlements
- Died: 7 June 2023 (aged 103)
- Occupations: Politician, lawyer
- Known for: Founder member of the Malayan Democratic Union
- Father: Lim Cheng Ean

Lim Kean Chye (Chinese: 林建材; pinyin: Lín Jiàncái; Pe̍h-ōe-jī: Lîm Kiàn-chhâi; 22 December 1919 – 7 June 2023) was a Malaysian politician and lawyer.

== Biography ==
Lim was the son of Lim Cheng Ean (Chinese: 林清淵; pinyin: Lín Qīngyuān; Jyutping: Lam4 Cing1 Jyun1; Pe̍h-ōe-jī: Lîm Chheng-ian), a Cambridge-trained lawyer and a legislative councillor in the 1930s, and the grandson of Phuah Hin Leong.

His brother Lim Kean Siew served as Dato Keramat MP for two terms from 1959 to 1969, representing the Labour Party of Malaya. His sister Lim Phaik Gan (P.G. Lim) was a prominent lawyer and diplomat.

Lim was a founder member of the Malayan Democratic Union, which was formed on 21 December 1945.

MDU was Singapore's first political party and consisted of English-educated Malaysians whose main objective was the assertion of the right to self-governance.

Upon returning to Malaya after completing his law degree from Cambridge University, Lim was contacted by Eu Chooi Yip and P V Sarma to join the Anti-British League (ABL), which he did.

He would later be mentor to Cambridge-educated leftist lawyer John Eber in the ABL.

The Cambridge-educated lawyer was also part of the All-Malaya Council of Joint Action (AMCJA), which drafted the People’s Constitutional Proposals for Malaya in 1947 as the basis for independence.

Lim was called to the Singapore Bar in 1950.

In January 1951, he escaped arrest and detention without trial when he went to China where he spent several years in exile.

He later said that he escaped because of the arresting officer’s mistake in alerting him.

When Lim Yew Hock was appointed Singapore’s chief minister in 1958, he decided to return home.

He was called to the Malayan Bar in 1961.

He eventually practiced in Ipoh but lived in Penang upon retirement. He turned 100 in December 2019, and died on 7 June 2023, at the age of 103.

Lim is survived by his wife, daughters Miao Ling and Miao Yiong, four grandchildren and seven great-grandchildren.
