= Victor Gu =

Malaysian actor (born 1977)

- Born: 1977 (age 48–49); Damansara Utama, Malaysia
- Notable credit(s): Hosting programs and game shows

Victor Gu
- Traditional Chinese: 胡渐彪
- Simplified Chinese: 胡渐彪
Transcriptions

Victor Gu (full name Victor Gu Chian Peow, born in 1977 in Damansara Utama, Malaysia) is a former NTV7 newscaster, was an active debater at Universiti Malaya. Gu is also a member of Malaysian Chinese Association (MCA), and a DJ for Wah FM. On NTV7, he hosted many shows, such as Bai Wan Fu Weng, the Mandarin-language Malaysian version of Who Wants to Be a Millionaire?.

Gu was chosen as Barisan Nasional (BN) candidate in the 2008 general election but he has lost.

== Election results ==
Selangor State Legislative Assembly: N36 Damansara Utama
Year	Opposition	Votes	Pct	Government	Votes	Pct	Ballots cast	Majority	Turnout
2008	Gu Chian Peow (MCA)	8,526	25.52%	Cheah Wing Yin (DAP)	24,881	74.48	34,757	16,355	74.85%

== Reality show participation ==
In 2015, Victor Gu won the third place in I am Speaker, a reality TV series in China. He beat some 50 other contestants to reach the grand finale of the show, which was aired on Beijing TV. In his past appearances, Gu spoke about Chinese education in Malaysia, justice and the death penalty.
