= Najwan Halimi =

Malaysian politician

Yang Berhormat Tuan Mohd Najwan Halimi MLA
- نجوان حليمي
- Najwan speaking at the 14th Islamic Solidarity Sports Association General Assembly in Riyadh, Saudi Arabia in 2025

Member of the Selangor State Executive Council (Youth & Sports Development, Entrepreneur & Creative Economy Empowerment and Disaster Management)
- Incumbent
- Assumed office 21 August 2023
- Monarch: Sharafuddin
- Menteri Besar: Amirudin Shari
- Preceded by: Mohd Khairuddin Othman (Youth and Sports); Rodziah Ismail (Entrepreneurship); Portfolio established (Creative Economy Empowerment); Amirudin Shari (Disaster Management)
- Constituency: Kota Anggerik

Member of the Selangor State Legislative Assembly for Kota Anggerik
- Incumbent
- Assumed office 9 May 2018
- Preceded by: Yaakob Sapari (PR–PKR)
- Majority: 17,004 (2018); 10,834 (2023)

Branch Chief of the People's Justice Party of Shah Alam
- Incumbent
- Assumed office 13 April 2025
- President: Anwar Ibrahim
- State Chairman: Amirudin Shari
- Preceded by: Rodziah Ismail

State Youth Chief of the People's Justice Party of Selangor
- In office 9 January 2019 – 28 June 2021
- President: Anwar Ibrahim
- State Chairman: Amirudin Shari
- Preceded by: Afzainizam Abd Rahman
- Succeeded by: Chua Wei Kiat

Faction represented in Selangor State Legislative Assembly
- 2018 –: Pakatan Harapan

Personal details
- Born: Mohd Najwan bin Halimi; 8 May 1985 (age 41) Petaling Jaya, Selangor, Malaysia
- Party: People's Justice Party (PKR) (2010–present)
- Other political affiliations: Pakatan Rakyat (PR) (2010–2015); Pakatan Harapan (PH) (2015–present)
- Spouses: Dayana Wahid (m. 2013; div. 2019) Syahira Razak (m. 2021)
- Children: 3
- Education: Universiti Tenaga Nasional; Universiti Putra Malaysia
- Website: Official website

Military service
- Allegiance: Yang di-Pertuan Agong
- Branch: Malaysian Army; Territorial Army Regiment
- Service years: 2015 – present
- Rank: Lance Corporal
- Unit: Rejimen AW 502

Mohd Najwan bin Halimi (Jawi: نجوان حليمي; born 8 May 1985) is a Malaysian politician who has served as Member of the Selangor State Executive Council (EXCO) in the Pakatan Harapan (PH) state administration under Menteri Besar Amirudin Shari since August 2023 and Member of the Selangor State Legislative Assembly (MLA) for Kota Anggerik since May 2018. He is a member of the People's Justice Party (PKR), a component party of the PH coalition. He is the current Division Chief of PKR of Shah Alam and served as the State Youth Chief of PKR of Selangor from January 2019 to June 2021. Najwan is one of the defence witnesses called by the Malaysian High Court in Anwar Ibrahim's second sodomy trial.

== Personal background ==
He grew up in Shah Alam and Subang Jaya, Selangor. He received his primary education at Sekolah Kebangsaan Raja Muda in Shah Alam and secondary education at Sekolah Menengah Sains Hulu Selangor in Hulu Selangor and had his university education at Universiti Tenaga Nasional, graduated with a bachelor's degree in mechanical engineering. He was actively involved in student activism during his campus days and was known as a skilled writer and an outspoken student leader.

After leaving university, Najwan joined the Malaysian Administrative and Diplomatic Service and served as Assistant Secretary at the Ministry of Transport.

In 2015, Najwan joined the Rejimen Askar Wataniah as a reservist after completing one month of training in June 2015.

== Political career ==
In 2010, Najwan joined Parti Keadilan Rakyat and he was subsequently appointed Deputy Information Chief for the party youth wing. During the 13th Malaysian general election, Najwan was seen actively campaigning for PKR advisor, Anwar Ibrahim for the parliamentary seat of Permatang Pauh, Penang. In 2014, Najwan was one of the candidates for Kelana Jaya Youth Chief in the PKR party elections.

In 2018, Najwan won his first attempt in the electoral campaign in 2018 for the Selangor state seat Kota Anggerik which helped the Pakatan Harapan coalition defeated Barisan Nasional and Parti Islam Se-Malaysia. Najwan defeated PAS candidate, Ahmad Dusuki Abd Rani and BN candidate Jumaeah Masdi with a majority of 17,004.

== Controversies ==
In 2012, a flag designed by Najwan in 2007 named Sang Saka Malaya was carried by supporters of Himpunan Janji Demokrasi with the red and white flag design together with the crescent moon and a star with 11 vertices in the eve of Malaysia's independence celebration. The flag became the central point in the national flag controversy in 2012.

In July 2023, a screenshot of a WhatsApp chat group went viral of Najwan sharing a news report on Parti Sosialis Malaysia's Meru candidate Sivaranjani Manickam for the 2023 state elections and commented that the party was an “Indian estate party”. Najwan apologised for his remarks while stating that he is not a racist.

== Anwar Ibrahim's Sodomy Trial ==
In 2011, Najwan was called by the Malaysian court as a witness for the Anwar Ibrahim's second sodomy trial due to his past relationship with Saiful Bukhari Azlan. According to him, Saiful was his batch mate during his time at UNITEN and both were close with each other and shared the same interest in politics. Based on a report by Free Malaysia Today, Najwan testified that Saiful was an ardent supporter of Barisan Nasional and the government and had expressed his dislike towards Anwar Ibrahim and that he (Saiful) although has principles, craves attention and publicity. Najwan was shocked upon learning the admission of Saiful to Anwar's office, serving as his personal secretary. In an interview by BBC, Najwan had suggested that Saiful Bukhari was an implant in-order to sabotage the reputation of the former opposition leader.

== Career ==
Upon graduating, Najwan had a brief stint working as an administrator with a federal ministry before working with the then opposition leader, Anwar Ibrahim. His secondment in the leader of the opposition's office lasted for four years. During his time working with the opposition leader, Najwan was among the staff that organised and arranged Anwar Ibrahim's daily schedules and important appointments. In 2015, Najwan was appointed the deputy director of Selangor State Sports Council (Majlis Sukan Negeri Selangor) in-charge of the youth development portfolio. He was instrumental in Selangor's participation in the 2016 SUKMA Games in Sarawak. At the end of the SUKMA games Selangor led the medal tally with 59 golds, 73 silvers and 64 bronzes.

== Election results ==
Selangor State Legislative Assembly
Year	Constituency	Candidate	Votes	Pct	Opponent(s)	Votes	Pct	Ballots cast	Majority	Turnout
2018	N40 Kota Anggerik	Mohd Najwan Halimi (PKR)	26,947	58.81%	Jumaeah Masdi (UMNO)	8,924	19.48%	45,814	17,004	88.55%
2018	N40 Kota Anggerik	Mohd Najwan Halimi (PKR)	26,947	58.81%	Ahmad Dusuki Abd Rani (PAS)	9,943	21.70%	45,814	17,004	88.55%
2023	N40 Kota Anggerik	Mohd Najwan Halimi (PKR)	38,470	55.97%	Mohamed Sukri Omar (PAS)	27,636	40.21%	68,737	10,834	72.27%
2023	N40 Kota Anggerik	Mohd Najwan Halimi (PKR)	38,470	55.97%	Azab Akbar Khan (MUDA)	2,631	3.83%	68,737	10,834	72.27%
