= Federation of Malaya =

Country in Southeast Asia (1948–1963)

Federation of Malaya Persekutuan Tanah Melayu
- 1948–1963
- Flag (1950–1963) Coat of arms (1952–1963)
- Motto: Bersekutu Bertambah Mutu (Malay) برسکوتو برتمبه موتو (Jawi) (English: "Unity is Strength")
- Anthem: "God Save the King" (1948–1952); "God Save the Queen" (1952–1957) Negaraku (from 1957) (English: "My Country")
- Location of the Federation of Malaya (green)
- Status: Protected state of the United Kingdom (1948–1957) Sovereign state (1957–1963)
- Capital: Kuala Lumpur; 3°9′0″N 101°40′45″E
- Official languages: Malay
- Recognised languages: English; Chinese; Tamil
- Government: Federation as British protectorate (1948–1957) Federal parliamentary elective constitutional monarchy (1957–1963)
- Monarch
  - 1948–1952: George VI
  - 1952–1957: Elizabeth II
  - 1957–1960: Abdul Rahman
  - 1960: Hisamuddin
  - 1960–1963: Putra
- High Commissioner
  - 1948: Edward Gent
  - 1948–1951: Henry Gurney
  - 1952–1954: Gerald Templer
  - 1954–1957: Donald MacGillivray
- Head of government
  - 1955–1957: Tunku Abdul Rahman (as Chief Minister)
  - 1957–1963: Tunku Abdul Rahman (as Prime Minister)
- Legislature: Federal Legislative Council (1948–1959); Parliament (since 1959)
  - Upper house: Dewan Negara (Senate) (since 1959)
  - Lower house: Dewan Rakyat (House of Representatives) (since 1959)
- History
  - Established: 1 February 1948
  - Independence: 31 August 1957
  - Malaysia Agreement: 16 September 1963

Area
  - Total: 131,952 km^{2} (50,947 sq mi)

Population
  - 1951 census: 5,517,222
- Currency: Malayan dollar (1948–1953); Malaya and British Borneo dollar (1953–1967)
- Time zone: UTC+7:30 (Malaya Standard Time)
Preceded by
Malayan Union
Crown Colony of Malacca
Crown Colony of Penang
Succeeded by
Malaysia
- Today part of: Malaysia

Malaya, (Note: Malay: Tanah Melayu) officially the Federation of Malaya, (Note: Malay: Persekutuan Tanah Melayu; Jawi: ڤرسكوتوان تانه ملايو) was a self-governing colony of the United Kingdom from 1948 to 1957 and a sovereign country in Southeast Asia from 1957 to 1963. It succeeded the Malayan Union and, before that, British Malaya. It comprised eleven states – nine Malay states and two of the Straits Settlements, Penang and Malacca. It was established on the 1st of February 1948.

Initially a self-governing colony of the United Kingdom, Malaya became fully sovereign on 31 August 1957, and on 16 September 1963, the federation was superseded by Malaysia when it united with Singapore, North Borneo (Sabah) and Sarawak. Singapore left on 9 August 1965, leaving the original states of Malaya along with Sarawak and Sabah – now collectively known as East Malaysia – to form modern-day Malaysia, while the former Federation of Malaya is now referred to as Peninsular Malaysia or West Malaysia.

== History ==
From 1946 to 1948, the eleven states formed a single British crown colony known as the Malayan Union. Due to opposition from Malay nationalists, the Union was disbanded and replaced by the Federation of Malaya, which restored the symbolic positions of the rulers of the Malay states and introduced greater restrictions on the attainment of citizenship status.

Within the Federation, while the Malay states were protectorates of the United Kingdom, Penang and Malacca remained British colonial territories. Like the Malayan Union before it, the Federation did not include Singapore, despite its traditional connections with Malaya.

The Malaya Agreement was formulated by the British–Malay Pleno Conference between June and December 1946. At the end of the meeting, the Pleno Conference produced a 100-page "Blue Book." It was signed on 21 January 1948 at King House by the Malay rulers, and by Sir Edward Gent as the representative of the British government. The Agreement superseded the Agreement creating the Malayan Union, and prepared for the establishment of the Federation of Malaya on 1 February 1948. The position of the Malay rulers was also restored.

The Federation became independent from British colonial rule and became an independent member of the Commonwealth of Nations on 31 August 1957. In 1963, the Federation was reconstituted as "Malaysia" when it federated with the British territories of Singapore, Sarawak, and North Borneo; a claim to the latter territory was maintained by the Philippines. Singapore separated from Malaysia to become an independent republic on 9 August 1965.

== List of member states ==
- Johor
- Kedah
- Kelantan
- Malacca
- Negeri Sembilan
- Pahang
- Penang
- Perak
- Perlis
- Selangor
- Terengganu

== System of government ==
Prior to its independence, the government of the Federation of Malaya was headed by a British high commissioner with executive powers, assisted and advised by the Federation of Malaya Executive Council and the Federation of Malaya Legislative Council.

- The Federation of Malaya Executive Council comprised 7 official and 7 unofficial members.
- The Federation of Malaya Legislative Council comprised the high commissioner as the council president, 14 official and 50 unofficial members representing the Straits Settlements, business groups and all races. Additionally, 9 State Council Yang Di Pertua (heads of state), chief ministers and 2 representatives from the Straits Settlements became unofficial members.
- The Malay Conference of Rulers would advise the high commissioner on immigration issues. The British Resident was replaced with a chief minister in each state of the federation.

=== Conditions of citizenship ===
The conditions of citizenship of the Federation of Malaya were further tightened using law enforcement and naturalisation by application. Under the laws, the following were automatically granted citizenship:

1. Citizens of the Sultan of any state
2. British subjects born in Penang or Malacca who have lived continuously for 15 years in the federation
3. British subjects born in the federation whose fathers were born or lived continuously for 15 years in the federation
4. Anyone born in the federation, conversant in the Malay language and following Malay traditions in his or her daily life
5. Anyone born in the federation whose parents were born and lived continuously for 15 years in the federation

Via naturalisation (by application), one could achieve citizenship, given these criteria:

1. Born and lived for at least 8 of 12 years in the Federation of Malaya before the application was made
2. Lived in the Federation of Malaya for at least 15 of 20 years before the application was made

In both cases (via naturalisation), applications must be well-behaved, swear allegiance and clarify their reasons for living in the federation, and are fluent in either the Malay or the English language.

The Federation of Malaya, through its constitution, guarantees the rights and special position of the Malay people as well as rights, powers and sovereignty of the Malay rulers in their respective states.

=== Separation of powers of the federal and state governments ===
The federation agreement (Perjanjian Persekutuan) set the powers of the federal and state governments. Financial matters must be handled by the respective states. The Sultan was given full power on religious issues and Malay customs. Foreign policy and defence continued to be administered by the British government. The federation agreement was made the Constitution of the Federation of Malaya and officially declared on 1 February 1948.

== Federation of Malaya Legislative Council ==
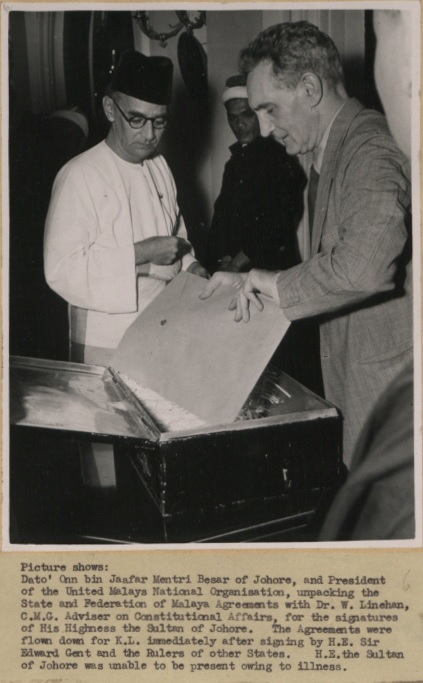
Dato' Onn bin Jaafar Mentri Besar of Johor, and President of the United Malays National Organisation, unpacking the State and Federation of Malaya Agreements with Dr. W. Linehan, C.M.G. Adviser on Constitutional Affairs, for the signatures of His Highness the Sultan of Johor, 1948

The Federation of Malaya Legislative Council held its first meeting in the Tuanku Abdul Rahman Hall, Kuala Lumpur in 1948. It was opened by the British high commissioner Sir Edward Gent. Attendees included the British minister of state for colonial affairs, Lord Listowel. The membership of the council was structured to include:

- the British high commissioner (as president);
- 3 ex officio members (namely the chief secretary, the financial secretary, and the attorney general);
- 11 "State and Settlement Members" (the president of the Council of State of each Malay state, and a member elected by each of the settlement councils)
- 11 official members; and
- 34 appointed "unofficial" members.

The unofficial members were required to be either Federation citizens or British subjects.

In 1948 the ethnic composition of the council was made up as follows:

- 28 Malay representatives, including all the chief ministers,
- 14 Chinese representatives,
- 6 Indian representatives, and
- 14 Europeans (the ex officio and official members).

Dato' Onn Jaafar stressed at the first meeting that the citizens of the Federation of Malaya did not want the interference of external powers in the affairs of the Federation; the Chinese representative Ong Chong Keng asserted that the Chinese people would be loyal to the Federation of Malaya. At this first council meeting, several minor committees were formed:

- the Standing Committee on Finance;
- the Election Committee; and
- the Committee of Privileges.

The first session passed the Kuala Lumpur City Bill, the Transfer of Power Bill, and the Loan and Debt Bill.

== Registration of PKMM rejected ==
In 1950, the Federation of Malaya Government rejected the registration of the Malay Nationalist Party of Malaya (Parti Kebangsaan Melayu Malaya, PKMM) as a legitimate political party. PKMM had two wings, namely Angkatan Pemuda Insaf and Angkatan Wanita Sedar. Initially, PKMM did not have communist leanings. After Mokhtaruddin Lasso was elected as the first PKMM president in October 1946, this party was influenced with communism. The Young Malays Union (Kesatuan Melayu Muda, KMM) merged with PKMM, and Burhanuddin al-Helmy became the second PKMM president. Burhanuddin led PKMM toward the formation of Melayu Raya, a merger of Indonesia and Malaya. In December 1947, Ishak Haji Mohamed became the third PKMM president and PKMM switched from communism to nationalism. PKMM tended against United Malays National Organisation (UMNO) and colonisation. PKKM established the Pusat Tenaga Rakyat (PUTERA), a conglomeration of radical Malay Political Parties and then merged with the All-Malaya Council of Joint Action (AMCJA) which thoroughly opposed the 1948 Federation Agreement for the foundation of the Federation of Malaya. PKMM accused officials selected in the Federation of Malaya of being "puppets" of the "Colonial Office". For PKMM, there was no basis in "preparing Malaya as a democratic government".

=== Judiciary ===
The judicial system was a typical hierarchical structure consisting of lower courts, a High Court and a Court of Appeal. Successive chief justices were Sir Stafford Foster-Sutton (1950–1951) (afterwards Chief Justice of Nigeria, 1955), Sir Charles Mathew (1951–1956) and Sir James Beveridge Thomson (1957–1963).

== Demographics ==
Federation of Malaya Population
Ethnic Group	1948	1951
Malay	2,457,014	2,631,154
Chinese	1,928,965	2,243,971
Indian	536,646	566,371
Other	64,802	75,726
Total	4,987,427	5,517,222

== See also ==
- Federation of Malaya Independence Act 1957
- Federal Legislative Council
- Peninsular Malaysia
- Malayan Emergency
- Reid Commission
