= Damansara Utama (state constituency) =

Selangor constituency

Defunct state constituency
- Legislature: Selangor State Legislative Assembly
- Constituency created: 1984
- Constituency abolished: 2018
- First contested: 1986
- Last contested: 2013

Damansara Utama was a state constituency in Selangor, Malaysia, that had been represented in the Selangor State Legislative Assembly since 1986 until 2018.

The state constituency was created in the 1984 redistribution and was mandated to return a single member to the Selangor State Legislative Assembly under the first past the post voting system.

In the 2018 redelineation exercise, this constituency was redistributed to Bandar Utama

== History ==
It was abolished in 2018 when it was redistributed

=== Representation history ===
Members of the Legislative Assembly for Damansara Utama
Assembly	No	Years	Member	Party
Constituency created from Petaling Jaya
7th	N25	1986-1990	M. Madhavan Nair	DAP
8th	N25	1990-1995	M. Madhavan Nair	GR (DAP)
9th	N25	1995-1999	Oon Hong Geok (溫鳳玉)	GR (DAP)
10th	N25	1999-2004	Lim Choon Kin (林春景)	BN (MCA)
11th	N36	2004-2008	Lim Choon Kin (林春景)	BN (MCA)
12th	N36	2008-2013	Cheah Wing Yin (謝永賢)	PR (DAP)
13th	N36	2013-2015	Yeo Bee Yin (楊美盈)	PR (DAP)
13th	N36	2015-2018	Yeo Bee Yin (楊美盈)	PH (DAP)
Constituency renamed to Bandar Utama

== Election results ==
Selangor state election, 2013
Party	Candidate	Votes	%	∆%
DAP	Yeo Bee Yin	37,303	84.21	▲9.73
BN	Lim Choon Kin	6,614	14.93	▼10.59
Independent	Liew Wei Beng	380	0.86	▲0.86
Total valid votes		44,297	100.00	
Total rejected ballots		341		
Unreturned ballots		16		
Turnout		44,654	83.63	▲10.93
Registered electors		53,394		
Majority		30,689	69.28	▲20.32
DAP hold		Swing		
Source(s) "Federal Government Gazette - Notice of Contested Election, State Legislative Assembly for the State of Selangor [P.U. (B) 192/2013]" (PDF). Attorney General's Chambers of Malaysia. 26 April 2013. Archived from the original (PDF) on 29 December 2019. "Federal Government Gazette - Results of Contested Election and Statements of the Poll after the Official Addition of Votes, State Constituencies for the State of Selangor [P.U. (B) 233/2013]" (PDF). Attorney General's Chambers of Malaysia. 22 May 2013. Archived from the original (PDF) on 2 October 2018. "undi.info N36 Damansara Utama".

Selangor state election, 2008
Party	Candidate	Votes	%	∆%
DAP	Cheah Wing Yin	24,881	74.48	▲35.32
BN	Gu Chian Peow	8,526	25.52	▼35.32
Total valid votes		33,407	100.00	
Total rejected ballots		324		
Unreturned ballots		26		
Turnout		33,757	72.70	▲2.06
Registered electors		46,435		
Majority		16,355	48.96	▲27.28
DAP gain from BN		Swing		?
Source(s) "undi.info N36 Damansara Utama".

Selangor state election, 2004
Party	Candidate	Votes	%	∆%
BN	Lim Choon Kin	19,124	60.84	▲4.19
DAP	Yim Chee Pooi	12,309	39.16	▼4.19
Total valid votes		31,433	100.00	
Total rejected ballots		374		
Unreturned ballots		23		
Turnout		31,830	70.64	▼2.31
Registered electors		45,058		
Majority		6,815	21.68	▲8.37
BN hold		Swing		
Source(s) "undi.info N36 Damansara Utama".

Selangor state election, 1999
Party	Candidate	Votes	%	∆%
BN	Lim Choon Kin	16,378	56.65	▲11.73
DAP	Ahmad Nor	12,531	43.35	▼11.73
Total valid votes		28,909	100.00	
Total rejected ballots		233		
Unreturned ballots		18		
Turnout		29,160	72.95	▲4.52
Registered electors		39,971		
Majority		3,847	13.31	▲3.16
BN gain from DAP		Swing		?

Selangor state election, 1995
Party	Candidate	Votes	%	∆%
DAP	Oon Hong Geok	14,116	55.07	▼4.50
BN	Tan Boon Kiat	11,515	44.93	▲4.50
Total valid votes		25,631	100.00	
Total rejected ballots		266		
Unreturned ballots		87		
Turnout		25,984	68.43	▼1.10
Registered electors		37,971		
Majority		2,601	10.15	▼9.00
DAP hold		Swing		

Selangor state election, 1990
Party	Candidate	Votes	%	∆%
DAP	Madhavan Nair Narayanan Nair	15,114	59.57	▲8.88
BN	Lee Hwa Beng	10,256	40.43	▼1.94
Total valid votes		25,370	100.00	
Total rejected ballots		364		
Unreturned ballots		93		
Turnout		25,827	69.53	▲0.17
Registered electors		37,146		
Majority		4,858	19.15	▲10.82
DAP hold		Swing		

Selangor state election, 1986
Party	Candidate	Votes	%
DAP	Madhavan Nair Narayanan Nair	10,050	50.70
BN	Chan Tse Yuen	8,399	42.37
SDP	Wong Sai Hou	1,374	6.93
Total valid votes		19,823	100.00
Total rejected ballots		298	
Unreturned ballots		0	
Turnout		20,121	69.36
Registered electors		29,010	
Majority		1,651	8.33
This was a new constituency created.
