= Mokhtaruddin Lasso =

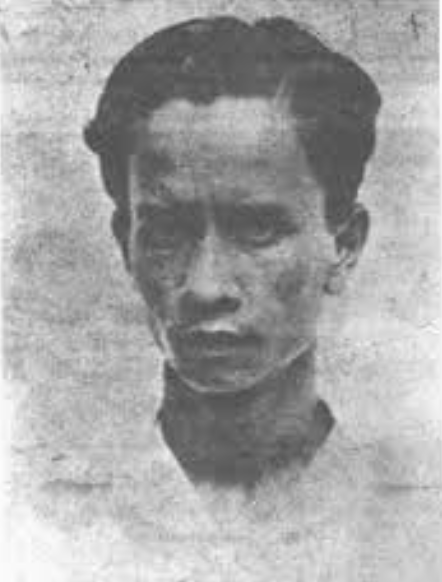
Mug shot of Mokhtaruddin Lasso

Mokhtaruddin Lasso (1915–1951) was a Sumatran-born Malayan independent guerrilla, a former anti-Japanese rebel during World War II who later became one of the founders of Parti Kebangsaan Melayu Malaya (PKMM – Malay Nationalist Party).

== Life ==
Mokhtaruddin was born in Padang, West Sumatera, in 1915. His given name was Mukhtar Sutan Indra Lasso. He had his early education in MULO, Padang. After Silungkang uprising, he left West Sumatra and went to Batavia joined with Indonesian National Party. In 1937, he moved to Singapore and Malaya. There he made a contact with Tan Malaka. Influenced by Tan Malaka's concept, he established Parti Kebangsaan Melayu Malaya and envisaged a socialist platform for the party. He was an atheist, the earliest known in Malay history, and once debated about the existence of a god with his colleague and future PAS president, Burhanuddin al-Helmy.

During the declaration day of PKMM policies, 30 November 1945, he revealed 8 resolutions which were considered influenced by the Communist Party of Malaya by the British colonists. Furthermore, PKMM's anti-UMNO and anti-British movement and activities were worried by the British. Due to this, the British refused Parti Kebangsaan Melayu Malaya's registration under the Malayan's establishment law. Later, Mokhtaruddin, along with few other anti-British leaders were imprisoned and presumably executed.

== Sources ==
- Harper, Timothy Norman; The End of Empire and the Making of Malaya, Cambridge University Press, 1999
