= Bandar Utama (state constituency) =

Malaysian state constituency

Bandar Utama (N36)
Selangor constituency

State constituency
- Legislature: Selangor State Legislative Assembly
MLA
Jamaliah Jamaluddin
PH
- Constituency created: 2018
- First contested: 2018
- Last contested: 2023

Demographics
- Electors (2023): 73,038

Bandar Utama is a state constituency in Selangor, Malaysia, that has been represented in the Selangor State Legislative Assembly since 2018.

The state constituency was created in the 2018 redistribution and is mandated to return a single member to the Selangor State Legislative Assembly under the first past the post voting system.

== Demographics ==
Ethnic breakdown of Bandar Utama's electorate as of 2023
1. Chinese (71.0%)
2. Malay (21.8%)
3. Indian (5.90%)
4. Other ethnicities (1.30%)

== History ==
=== Polling districts ===
According to the federal gazette issued on 18 July 2023, the Bandar Utama constituency is divided into 18 polling districts.

State constituency	Polling districts	Code	Location
Bandar Utama (N36）	SS 21 Utara	106/36/01	SK Damansara Utama
Bandar Utama (N36）	SS 20	106/36/02	SMK Damansara Utama
Bandar Utama (N36）	Damansara Jaya Utara	106/36/03	SMK Damansara Jaya
Bandar Utama (N36）	SS 23	106/36/04	SK Taman Megah
Bandar Utama (N36）	SS 24	106/36/05	SK Taman Megah
Bandar Utama (N36）	SS 26	106/36/06	SJK (C) Yuk Chai
Bandar Utama (N36）	Kampung Chempaka	106/36/07	SMK Tropicana Petaling Jaya
Bandar Utama (N36）	SS 25	106/36/08	SK Taman Megah
Bandar Utama (N36）	SS 4	106/36/09	SMK Kelana Jaya SS4
Bandar Utama (N36）	SS 21 Selatan	106/36/10	Dewan Seberguna MBPJ SS 21/12
Bandar Utama (N36）	Damansara Jaya Selatan	106/36/11	SK Damansara Jaya (1); SK Damansara Jaya (2)
Bandar Utama (N36）	Bandar Utama BU 1 & BU 2	106/36/12	SMK Bandar Utama
Bandar Utama (N36）	Sungai Kayu Ara Utara	106/36/13	SRA Kampung Sungai Kayu Ara
Bandar Utama (N36）	Bandar Utama BU 3 - BU 10	106/36/14	SMK Bandar Utama Damansara (3)
Bandar Utama (N36）	Bandar Utama BU 11 - BU 12	106/36/15	SJK (T) Effingham Bandar Utama
Bandar Utama (N36）	Sungai Kayu Ara Selatan	106/36/16	SK Bandar Utama Damansara
Bandar Utama (N36）	Kayu Ara Indah	106/36/17	SK Bandar Utama Damansara (2)
Bandar Utama (N36）	Sunway Damansara PJU 3	106/36/18	SJK (C) Damansara

=== Representation history ===
Members of the Legislative Assembly for Bandar Utama
Assembly	No	Years	Member	Party
Constituency created from Damansara Utama and Bukit Lanjan
14th	N36	2018–2023	Jamaliah Jamaluddin	PH (DAP)
15th	N36	2023–present	Jamaliah Jamaluddin	PH (DAP)

== Election results ==
Selangor state election, 2023
Party	Candidate	Votes	%	∆%
PH	Jamaliah Jamaluddin	39,845	85.25	▼5.20
PN	Nur Aliff Mohd Tafid	4,399	9.41	▲9.41
MUDA	Abe Lim Hooi Sean	2,496	5.34	▲5.34
Total valid votes		46,740	100.00	
Total rejected ballots		153		
Unreturned ballots		108		
Turnout		47,001	64.35	▼19.30
Registered electors		73,038		
Majority		35,446	75.84	▼5.51
PH hold		Swing		

Selangor state election, 2018
Party	Candidate	Votes	%
PKR	Jamaliah Jamaluddin	38,561	90.45
BN	Ch'ng Soo Chau	3,882	9.11
Independent	Chong Fook Meng	188	0.44
Total valid votes		42,631	100.00
Total rejected ballots		165	
Unreturned ballots		288	
Turnout		43,084	83.65
Registered electors		51,504	
Majority		34,679	81.35
This was a new constituency created
