= Asri Muda =

Malaysian politician

Yang Berbahagia Dato' Sri Paduka Raja Tan Sri Dato' Mohd Asri Muda PMN SPMK SPDK PMK
- محمد عصري مودا

3rd Leader of the Opposition
- In office 1971–1973
- Monarch: Abdul Halim
- Prime Minister: Abdul Razak Hussein
- Preceded by: Tan Chee Khoon (Position vacant during parliament suspension 1969-1971)
- Succeeded by: Lim Kit Siang

4th President of the Malaysian Islamic Party
- In office 1969–1982
- Preceded by: Burhanuddin al-Helmy
- Succeeded by: Yusof Rawa

Menteri Besar of Kelantan
- In office 1964–1973
- Preceded by: Ishak Lotfi Omar
- Succeeded by: Mohamed Nasir

Personal details
- Born: Mohd Asri bin Muda; 10 October 1923 Kota Bharu, Kelantan, Unfederated Malay States, British Malaya (now Malaysia)
- Died: 28 August 1992 (aged 68) Kuala Lumpur, Malaysia
- Resting place: Bukit Kiara Muslim Cemetery, Kuala Lumpur
- Citizenship: Malaysian
- Party: PAS (until 1983); HAMIM (1983–1988); UMNO (1989–1992)
- Spouse: Sakinah Junid
- Children: 9

Mohd Asri bin Muda (Jawi: محمد عصري بن مودا; 10 October 1923 – 28 August 1992) was a Malaysian politician who served as the President of the Pan-Malaysian Islamic Party (PAS) from 1969 to 1982, and as the Menteri Besar (Chief Minister) of Kelantan from 1964 to 1973.

== Early and personal life ==
Asri was born on 10 October 1923 in Kota Bharu, the capital of Kelantan. He was a school teacher and journalist before entering politics. He was elected to the Kelantan State Assembly and the federal House of Representatives in the 1959 election. He married Sakinah Junid on 15 August 1948 and has 9 children, 2 males and 7 females, namely Noordianauli Asri, Husni Zaim, Ratna Inzah, Mutia Sabihah, Naliyah, Khalidah, Nasibah, Najah and Mohd Taqiuddin.

== Menteri Besar of Kelantan ==
Asri became the Menteri Besar of Kelantan in 1964, replacing Ishak Lotfi Omar. He served as Menteri Besar until 1974, when he resigned to become a Minister in the federal government.

== PAS Presidency ==
Under Asri's leadership, PAS became a member of the governing Barisan Nasional (BN) coalition for the first and only time, from 1973 to 1978. Asri became the Minister for Land and Rural Development in the BN government. Asri's leadership was also notable for the shifting of PAS's outlook towards Malay nationalism. Both joining the BN coalition and moving away from religious-based policy platforms caused the party to lose support. In 1982, Asri was ousted as PAS leader by the religious ulama faction of the party, to be replaced by Yusof Rawa. After Asri's tenure, PAS shifted to a more radical religious platform.

== After PAS ==
Following his loss of the PAS presidency, Asri refrained from joining the United Malays National Organisation (UMNO) or Pan-Malaysian Islamic Front (BERJASA), decided to form his own Muslim People's Party of Malaysia or Parti Hizbul Muslimin Malaysia (HAMIM) in 1983 but failed to achieve any electoral success. He resigned from HAMIM together with other party representatives on 17 November 1988 after his attempt to dissolve HAMIM in an Extraordinary Muktamar failed. In 1988, he finally joined PAS's rivals UMNO, claiming that PAS had "deviated" and had been "infiltrated by extremist foreign elements".

== Honours ==
=== Honours of Malaysia ===
- Malaysia
  - Recipient of the Malaysian Commemorative Medal (Gold) (PPM) (1965)
  - Commander of the Order of the Defender of the Realm (PMN) – Tan Sri (1992)
- Kelantan
  - Commander of the Order of the Crown of Kelantan (PMK) (1963)
  - Knight Grand Commander of the Order of the Crown of Kelantan (SPMK) – Dato' (1965)
  - Dato' Sri Paduka Raja (1969)
- Sabah
  - Grand Commander of the Order of Kinabalu (SPDK) – Datuk Seri Panglima (1974)

== See also ==
- 1978 Malaysian general election
- Parti Hizbul Muslimin Malaysia (HAMIM)

Political offices
Preceded by Tan Chee Khoon	Leader of the Opposition of Malaysia; 1971–1973	Succeeded by Lim Kit Siang
Preceded by Ishak Lotfi Omar	Menteri Besar of Kelantan; 1964–1974	Succeeded by Mohamed Nasir
Party political offices
Preceded by Burhanuddin al-Helmy	President of the Pan-Malaysian Islamic Party; 1969–1982	Succeeded by Yusof Rawa
