= Wahi Annuar =

Malayan communist

Wahi Annuar was a Malayan communist. He took to the forests at the beginning of the Malayan emergency. He was a leader in the MRLA 10th Malay Regiment. He was the fourth husband of fellow Communist Party of Malaya leader Shamsiah Fakeh. However, he surrendered to the British in February 1950 and Shamsiah believed him dead. He eventually died many years later in 1980.
