= Angkatan Wanita Sedar =

- Formation: 1946
- Dissolved: 1948

Angkatan Wanita Sedar (AWAS; Conscious Women's Front) was the first nationalist women's organisation in Malaysia. It was established in 1946 as women's wing of the Malay Nationalist Party (Malay: Parti Kebangsaan Melayu Malaya, PKMM). Aishah Ghani was the first president of AWAS. The organisation was also led by Shamsiah Fakeh. At its peak, AWAS had a membership of 2000 women. The group organised, held discussions and hosted Indonesian women visitors. AWAS members, led by Sakinah Junid, participated in a six-mile protest march against the British prohibition disallowing the use of motorised vehicles in processions.

Anthropologist Wazir Jahan Karim attributes the impetus for the creation of AWAS to the core leaders of the organisation: Aishah Ghani, Sakinah Junid and Shamsiah Fakeh.

On 22 February 1947, AWAS joined the People's Action Centre (PUTERA), a coalition of six left-wing political parties led by Ishak Haji Muhammad (Pak Sako). Following the defeat of Japan, the British Military Administration resumed control of Malaya and banned AWAS in 1948 together with several other political parties like PKMM and Hizbul Muslimin, accusing for having connection with Malayan Communist Party.
