= Nan Chiau Jit Pao =

Pro-Chinese Communist Party newspaper

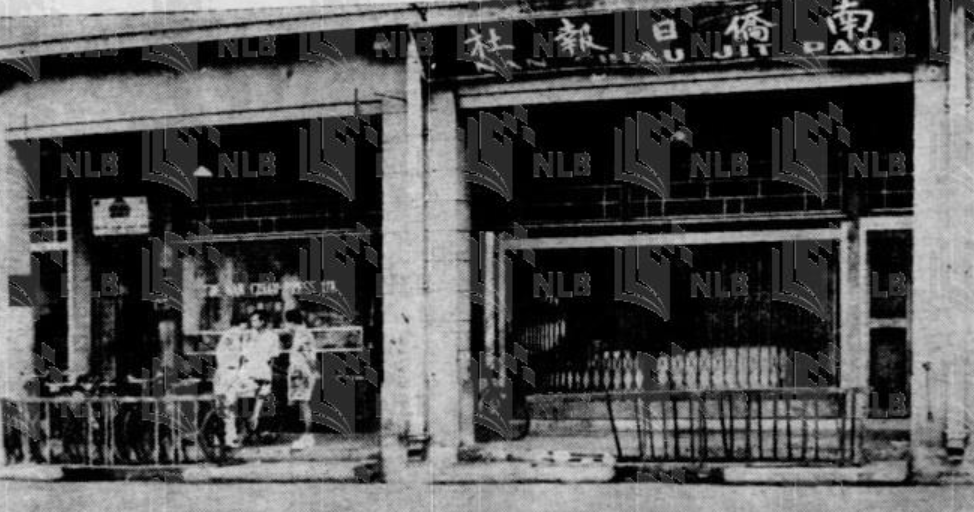
- Format: Broadsheet
- Founder: Tan Kah Kee
- Launched: November 1946; 79 years ago
- Ceased publication: September 19, 1950; 75 years ago
- Political alignment: Chinese Communist Party
- Language: Chinese
- Headquarters: Straits Settlements
- Country: Straits Settlements

Nan Chiau Jit Pao (Chinese: 南侨日报; pinyin: Nánqiáo Rìbào; Pe̍h-ōe-jī: Lâm-kiâu Ji̍t-pò; also known as the Nan Chiau Jit Pau), was a pro-Chinese Communist Party newspaper published in Singapore. Founded by Tan Kah Kee, it was an organ of the China Democratic League in Singapore. It was banned along with the Xian Dai Ri Bao in 1950.

== History ==
The Nan Chiau Jit Pao was founded by prominent businessman Tan Kah Kee in November 1946 with a number of supporters for a capital of $500,000. Tan was a major shareholder of the paper, having invested $25,000 towards the paper's establishment. The paper became the organ of both the Singapore branch of the China Democratic League and Tan, which was against Chiang Kai-shek while supporting Mao Zedong. The newspaper was ranked as one of the three largest Chinese newspapers in Singapore, having a daily circulation of between 12,000 and 20,000.

An article published in the Nan Chiau Jit Pao on 21 July 1950 criticised the new emergency powers granted by the Malayan government which would allow authorities to close down newspapers which supported terrorists or opposed the actions taken by the United Nations in the Korean War. The newspaper launched a "peace campaign" on 8 September, asking its readers to sign a declaration to prohibit the use of the Atom Bomb as a weapon of aggression. Both the Nan Chiau Jit Pao and the Xian Dai Ri Bao, also known as Morning Daily News, in Penang were banned by British authorities on 19 September 1950. The closing of the paper was made using the emergency powers granted to the government. By October 1950, out of the staff of the newspaper, nine were detained, with two of the nine being released later and the others receiving detention orders, and with one former staff of the newspaper being on the run.
