= Pusat Tenaga Ra'ayat =

The Pusat Tenaga Ra'ayat (PUTERA) was a major political party in Malaysia opposed to the United Malays National Organisation (UMNO) and the Malay-supremacist ideology of Ketuanan Melayu. It formed an opposition coalition with the All-Malaya Council of Joint Action. "Ra'ayat" is the archaic spelling for the Malay word rakyat which means "citizens".

== See also ==
- List of political parties in Malaysia
