= Burhanuddin al-Helmy =

Malaysian politician

Yang Berbahagia Dato' Seri Dr. Burhanuddin al-Helmy SPMP
- برهان الدين بن محمد نور الحلمي

1st Leader of the Opposition
- In office 1959–1964
- Monarchs: Abdul Rahman; Hisamuddin; Putra
- Prime Minister: Tunku Abdul Rahman
- Succeeded by: Tan Chee Khoon

3rd President of the Malaysian Islamic Party
- In office 1956 – 25 October 1969
- Preceded by: Abbas Alias
- Succeeded by: Mohd Asri Muda

Personal details
- Born: 29 August 1911 Kota Bharu, Gopeng, Perak, Federated Malay States (now Malaysia)
- Died: 25 October 1969 (aged 58) Taiping, Perak
- Party: Kesatuan Melayu Muda; Parti Kebangsaan Melayu Malaya; Pan-Malaysian Islamic Party
- Parent(s): Muhammad Nur; Sharifah Zaharah Habib Osman

Burhanuddin bin Muhammad Nur al-Hilmi (Jawi: برهان الدين بن محمد نور الحلمي; 29 August 1911 – 25 October 1969), commonly known as Burhanuddin al-Helmy, was a Malaysian Islamic thinker, anti-colonial nationalist, and politician. He served as the third President of the Malaysian Islamic Party (PAS) from 1956 until his death, and was Member of Parliament for Besut between 1959 and 1964. Known for his role in shaping PAS’s early ideological direction, he blended Islamic reformism with third-world anti-imperialist thought, and is widely regarded as one of the party’s most intellectually influential leaders.

== Early and personal life ==
Burhanuddin was born in Kota Bharu, Perak in 1911 to a Minangkabau father from West Sumatra and a mother from Malacca. He was educated in Penang and Sumatra, and later studied at Aligarh Muslim University in India, where he encountered Islamic reformist and anti-colonial ideas. After his studies in India, Burhanudin travelled to Turkey and Mandatory Palestine, where in Palestine, he was arrested by British authorities in a protest against the Balfour Declaration in 1936 before released shortly after. After returning to Malaya, he taught Arabic at Madrasah Aljunied Al-Islamiah in Singapore. During this time, he was arrested by the British, but released the next day due to intervention by the Alsagoff family. Burhanuddin also obtained a Doctor of Naturopathy in London, which allowed him to open clinics in Johor Bahru and Singapore.

== Post-war activism ==
After World War II, Burhanuddin co-founded the Parti Kebangsaan Melayu Malaya (PKMM) and became its president in 1946. He was also a key figure in the formation of the Islamic movement MATA and the short-lived Hizbul Muslimin. His major works, such as Perjuangan Kita and Asas Falsafah Kebangsaan Melayu, combined Islamic principles with nationalist and leftist ideas, promoting a form of "theocratic socialism" and pan-Islamic solidarity. He advocated for unity with Indonesia and supported independence efforts in Patani and Palestine.

Burhanuddin also played a prominent role in the 1950 Maria Hertogh (Natrah) custody crisis in Singapore, which ignited widespread anger among Muslims across the region. His vocal condemnation of the British court ruling and mobilisation of Muslim sentiment elevated his public image as a defender of Islam and Malay rights. His speeches and writings during the incident were later cited by British authorities when he was arrested and imprisoned in 1951 under Emergency Regulations.

== PAS Presidency ==
Burhanuddin assumed the presidency of PAS in December 1956, after internal tensions pushed for a more dynamic leadership. He sought to transform PAS from a conservative rural-based party into a modern political movement with urban, trade unionist, and student support. Under his leadership, PAS gained national prominence and became more ideologically structured, including through the establishment of a cadre system and ideological training modules. He won the Besut parliamentary seat in the 1959 general election and was re-elected as PAS president multiple times until his death in 1969. His leadership era was marked by support for trade unions, anti-colonial solidarity, and Islamic intellectualism. He has been described as a "radical nationalist and Islamic thinker".

== Arrest and death ==
In 1965, Burhanuddin was arrested under the Internal Security Act during the Indonesia–Malaysia confrontation. He was accused of conspiring to install a pro-Indonesia government in Malaysia, and several of his earlier speeches and writings were used as justification for his detention. He was imprisoned without trial for one year. Following his release, his health deteriorated and he gradually withdrew from public life. He died on 25 October 1969 and were buried in Masjid Lama Bandar Taiping.

== Legacy ==
Burhanuddin is remembered as a foundational figure in Malaysian Islamic politics and one of PAS’s most ideologically significant leaders. His blend of anti-colonial activism, Islamic reformism, and Malay nationalism placed him in the tradition of Southeast Asia’s leading postcolonial thinkers. Scholars have described him as comparable to figures such as Patrice Lumumba and Kwame Nkrumah for articulating a uniquely Islamic third-worldist vision in the post-war era.

His intellectual legacy influenced PAS’s ideological development well after his death. Later leaders, particularly during the 1980s ulama revival, drew on Burhanuddin’s model of Islamic governance as a reference for integrating political activism with religious principles. His emphasis on moral leadership, pan-Islamic solidarity, and resistance to colonial structures laid the groundwork for subsequent ideological realignments within the party.

During the leadership of Yusof Rawa and Abdul Hadi Awang, PAS underwent a major ideological shift away from Malay ethno-nationalism toward a pan-Islamist platform. This transformation has been seen as a continuation of the reformist and anti-imperialist discourse Burhanuddin had championed in the 1950s and 1960s.

== Election results ==
Parliament of the Federation of Malaya
Year	Constituency	Candidate	Votes	Pct	Opponent(s)	Votes	Pct	Ballots cast	Majority	Turnout
1959	P025 Besut	Burhanuddin al-Helmy (PMIP)	9,988	70.32%	Husin Abdullah (UMNO)	4,216	29.68%	14,409	5,772	67.33%

== Honours ==
=== Awards ===
- Perak
  - Knight Grand Commander of the Order of the Perak State Crown (SPMP) – Dato' Seri (2015; posthumously)

=== Places named after him ===
Several places were named after him, including:

- Jalan Burhanuddin Helmi in Taman Tun Dr Ismail, Kuala Lumpur
- Persiaran Burhanuddin Helmi in Taman Tun Dr Ismail, Kuala Lumpur
- Sekolah Menengah Kebangsaan Doktor Burhanuddin in Taiping, Perak
- Sekolah Rendah Islam Burhanuddin Al-Helmy in Alor Setar, Kedah
- Kolej Burhanuddin Helmi, one of the residential college in National University of Malaysia, Bangi, Selangor

Political offices
Preceded by Abbas Alias	President of the Pan-Malaysian Islamic Party; 1956 - 1969	Succeeded by Asri Muda
