= Malaysians of Indonesian descent =

Malaysian citizen of Indonesian descent

Malaysians of Indonesian origin
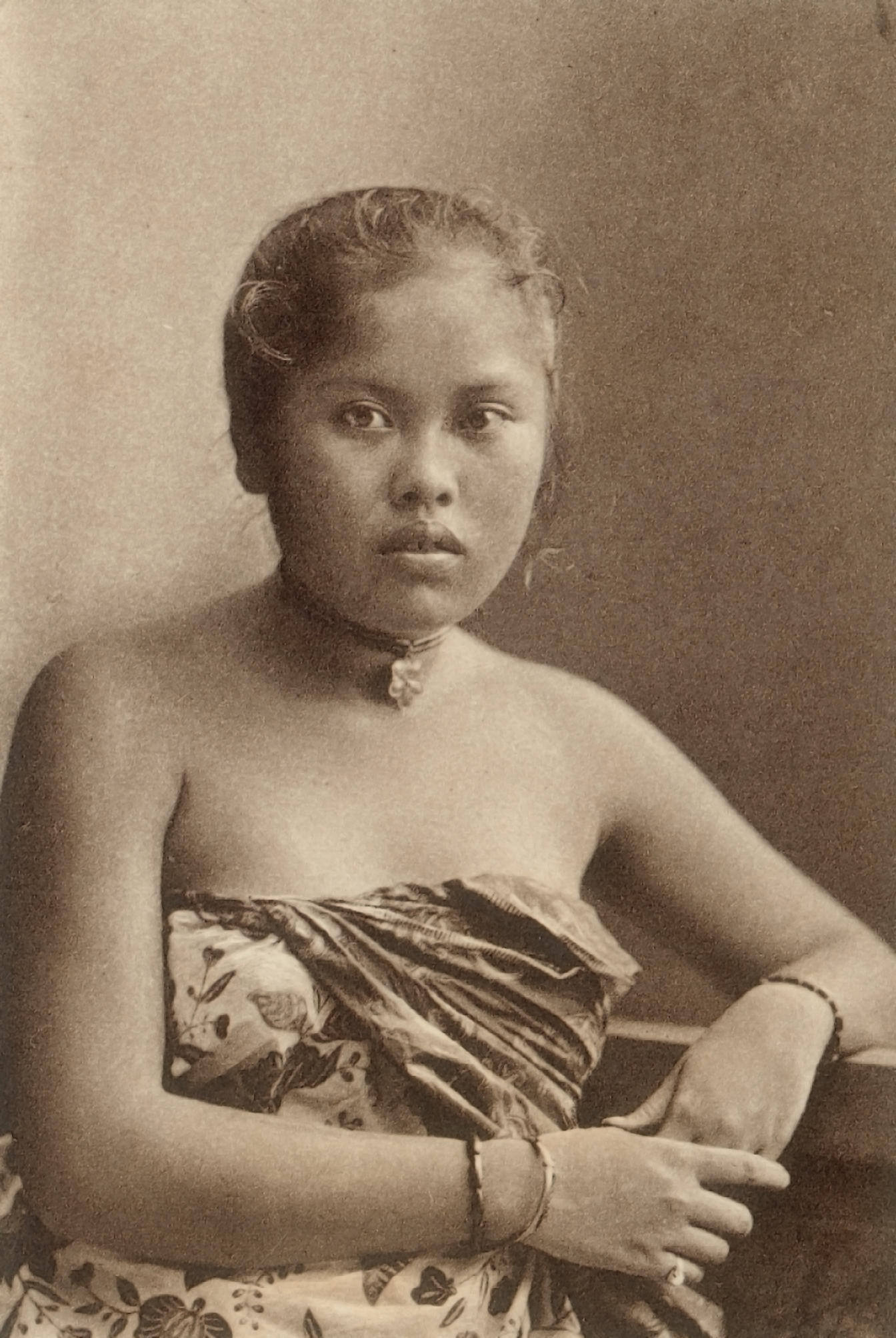
- Javanese women in Malay Peninsula, circa 1910.

Regions with significant populations
- Nationwide

Languages
- Predominantly; Malay (Malaysian Malay): Javanese; Minangkabau; Bugis; Acehnese; Mandailing; Banjar and other

Religion
- Predominantly Sunni Islam

Related ethnic groups
- Indonesian diaspora: Minangkabau; Javanese; Acehnese and other

The Indonesian Malaysians (Malay/Indonesian: Orang Malaysia Keturunan Indonesia) are Malaysian citizens of Indonesian ancestry. Today, there are many Malaysian Malays who have lineage from the Indonesian archipelago and have played an important role in the history and contributed to the development of Malaysia, they have been assimilated with other Malay communities and are grouped as part of the foreign Malays or anak dagang in terms of race. The Malaysian census does not categorize ethnic groups from the Indonesian archipelago as a separate ethnic group, but rather as Malay or Bumiputera.

Article 160 of the Malaysian Constitution only states the criteria for a person to be considered a Malay; which is to profess the religion of Islam, habitually speak the Malay language, conform to Malay custom and be born to a Malaysian parent.

Several ethnic groups of Indonesian origin such as Acehnese, Minangkabau, Javanese, Baweanese, Banjarese, Mandailing, and Buginese have significant migration to Malaysia and form significant communities in Malaysia. Negeri Sembilan, in particular, has large numbers of Minangkabau, Acehnese in Kedah, Javanese in Johor, Banjarese in Perak, and Buginese in Selangor and Sabah. There are three kings and six prime ministers of Malaysia who also have ethnic lineage from the Indonesian archipelago, such as the kings of Johor and Selangor who have Buginese lineages, and king of Negeri Sembilan who have Minangkabau lineages. Malaysia's former first king Tuanku Abdul Rahman, Najib Razak, and Muhyiddin Yassin, each of them have Minangkabau, Bugis, and Javanese ancestry.

== History ==
The extent of Majapahit Nusantara according to Nagarakretagama.

The history of Indonesia and history of Malaysia were often intertwined. Throughout their history, the borders of ancient kingdoms and empires – such as Srivijaya, Majapahit, Malacca and Johor-Riau – often comprised both modern-day countries. For centuries, the relations, migrations, and interactions between Indonesian and Malaysian people have been quite intense, and it is common for Malaysians to trace their relatives in Indonesia and vice versa.

The migration of Indonesians to Malaysia can be traced back since before the colonial time especially during the Srivijaya and Majapahit administration. The first king of the Malacca Sultanate was descended from the Srivijaya prince Sang Nila Utama from Palembang. Interracial marriages between Sultanates such as between Sultan Mansur Shah of Malacca and the Princess Raden Galuh Chandra Kirana of Majapahit are stated in the Malay Annals. Other historical texts such as Tuhfat al-Nafis (known as Sejarah Melayu dan Bugis (History of the Malays and Bugis)), stated the relations between different Sultanates of Johor-Riau, Kedah, Perak, Selangor, Pahang, and Terengganu on the peninsula with the east and west coasts of Sumatra and Kalimantan.

During the British occupation, Malaysia was integrated into the world's commodity and capital markets, became a source of resources for the colonizers (suzerain) and began to face labor shortages. Britain then looked for sources of labor from countries such as India and China. Indonesians became the third source of labor and the British viewed and treated them differently from Indians and Chinese because they were considered to have the same race as Malays.

Post-decolonization, the government, like other political institutions in a democracy, tries to maintain its mandate and legitimacy through elections. This has implications for providing incentives and broadening the support base. By classifying Indonesian migrants (such as Javanese, Minangkabau, Bugis, Bawean, Banjar, Mandailing, Acehnese and others) into ethnic Malays, the government party Pertubuhan Kebangsaan Melayu Bersatu or UMNO expanded its mass base. The reason for the classification and the criteria for ethnic Malays in the Malaysian constitution is a socio-historical construction. This historical aspect exists because the identity defined in the Malaysian constitution has existed since the time of the Malacca sultanate in contrast to the Orang Asli or the Dayak people. So that anyone who meets the socio-religious requirements of the Malays is classified as a Malay (ethnic group).

== Population ==
=== Minangkabau ===
The Minangkabau Malaysians are people of full or partial Minangkabau descent who were born in or immigrated to Malaysia. They form a significant part of Malaysia's population and Malaysian law considers most of them to be Malays. The Minangkabau people originate from West Sumatra, have a long history of migration to Malaysia. Minangkabau people are dominant in Negeri Sembilan, both in terms of population, politics, and culture. At the beginning of the 14th century, the Minangkabau people arrived in Negeri Sembilan via Melaka and initially settled in Rembau. The Minangkabau people who arrived at that time had a more advanced civilisation than the Orang Asli (a term used to describe the indigenous people in the area) in Negeri Sembilan. From the marriage between the Minangkabau people and the Orang Asli, the Biduanda clan was born. It is from the Biduanda clan that the chieftains of Negeri Sembilan (the 'Penghulu' and 'Undang') descend. The initial migration of the Minangkabau people mostly came from the Tanah Datar and Payakumbuh areas of West Sumatra.

Before the establishment of the Yang di-Pertuan Besar post and the royal institution, Negeri Sembilan was under the protection of the Malacca Sultanate and then the Johor Sultanate. In the 18th century the weakened Johor was no longer able to protect Negeri Sembilan from Bugis attacks. Therefore, the leaders of Negeri Sembilan requested that they be allowed to invite a prince from Pagaruyung (West Sumatra) to rule over them. The then King of Pagaruyung, Sultan Abdul Jalil, granted the request and sent Raja Melewar to become King, or Yamtuan Besar in Seri Menanti.

The Negeri Sembilan people follow the Adat Perpatih customs and traditions, which involves inheritance based on matrilineal lineage; clan lineage is also determined by matrilineal descent.

The population census in Malaysia does not categorise Minangkabau as a separate ethnic group, but is generally classified as Malay. However, based on estimates, there are around 989,000 Minangkabau people living in Malaysia. Although accounting for less than 5% of Malaysia's population, their presence has contributed significantly to the development of this country. Before independence, there were many Minangkabau people in Malaysia who took part and held significant influence. They were mostly traders, clerics, and politicians. Long before the arrival of the British to Penang, there were already many Minang businessmen who traded on the island. Datuk Jannaton, Nakhoda Intan, dan Nakhoda Kecil are some of the cross-strait entrepreneurs based in Penang. In the 19th century, Muhammad Saleh Al-Minankabawi became the mufti of the Perak Kingdom and Uthman bin Abdullah became the first qadi in Kuala Lumpur. In addition, Mohamed Taib bin Haji Abdul Samad, who has a fairly large business, became an explorer in the Chow Kit area in Kuala Lumpur. In the mid-20th century, many Minangkabau figures became politicians at the same time. Some of them are Abdullah C.D., Ahmad Boestamam, Burhanuddin al-Hilmi, Shamsiah Fakeh, and Mokhtaruddin Lasso.

After independence, many important Malaysian figures and public figures were of Minangkabau descent. These include Sheikh Muszaphar Shukor, Malaysia's first spaceman, Rafidah Aziz, the longest serving government minister, U-Wei Haji Saari, one of Malaysia's acclaimed directors, entrepreneur Kamarudin Meranun, and Saiful Bahri, the composer of Malaysia's national anthem, "Negaraku".

=== Bugis ===
The Bugis Malaysians are people of full or partial Bugis descent who were born in or immigrated to Malaysia. They form a significant part of Malaysia's population and Malaysian law considers most of them to be Malays.

In Malaysia, there are two primary Bugis groups: the Bugis-Malays and the Sabahan Bugis. The Bugis-Malays, who are descendants of early Bugis migrants to the Malay Peninsula and Sarawak between the 17th and 20th centuries, have largely integrated into Malay culture. In contrast, the Sabahan Bugis, who arrived in Sabah in the 20th century, have retained a distinct Bugis identity.

The Bugis people originate from South Sulawesi and have played an important role in Malaysian history. The Bugis at that time were directly involved in the politics of the Malay kingdoms. The conclusion in 1669 of a protracted civil war led to a diaspora of Bugis and their entry into the politics of the Sumatra and Malay Peninsula. The Bugis played an important role in defeating Jambi and had a huge influence in Sultanate of Johor. Apart from the Malays, another influential faction in Johor at that time was the Minangkabau. Both the Buginese and the Minangkabau aware how the death of Sultan Mahmud II had provided them with the chance to exert major influence in Johor.

It started when King Sulaiman Badrul Alam Shah wanted to control Johor and Riau-Lingga, which was controlled by Sultan Abdul Jalil Rahmat Shah (also known as Raja Kecil). Then with the help of the Bugis from Klang, King Sulaiman managed to seize the territory of Johor and Riau Lingga from the hands of Raja Kecil. In return, King Sulaiman gave the title of Yang Dipertuan Muda to Daeng Marewah who ruled in Johor and Riau Lingga. Until now, the kings in the Sultanate of Johor and the Sultanate of Selangor are of Bugis descent. The population census in Malaysia also does not categorize the Bugis as a separate ethnic group, but rather as a Malay ethnic group. The presence of the Bugis in Malaysia has become a part of history and a contribution to the development of Malaysia. Several Prime Ministers of Malaysia are of Bugis descent, include Tun Abdul Razak and his son Najib Razak. There are also many Malaysian public figures who have Bugis ancestry such as the famous Malaysian singer, Yuna.

In modern Malaysia, Buginese are classified as Bumiputera (like members of other historical immigrant ethnicities originating from Indonesia).

=== Bengkulu ===
Many ethnic groups of Bengkulu have reached the Malay Peninsula, now Malaysia, since colonial times. They migrated at the end of the 19th century, settling in the small town of Sungai Choh which is currently known as the largest Bengkulu descendants in Malaysia. They mostly come from the Bengkulu Malays, besides that there are also Lembak in Kampung Lembak (an area in Sungai Choh) and Rejang.

=== Javanese ===
The Javanese Malaysians are people of full or partial Javanese descent who were born in or immigrated to Malaysia. They form a significant part of Malaysia's population and Malaysian law considers most of them to be Malays. They come from Java, Malaysia is home to the largest Javanese population outside Indonesia. Many important and well-known figures in Malaysia are of Javanese descent. Javanese migration to Malaysia had occurred before the colonial era. The first wave of Javanese people came during the Sultanate of Malacca era in the 15th century. Political marriages between kingdoms, such as between Sultan Mansur Shah of Malacca sultanate and Princess Raden Galuh Chandra Kirana of Majapahit, were an evidence that the interaction between nations has started a long time ago. This story is told in the 16th century ancient Malay manuscript, Sulalatus Salatin. The Javanese in Malaysia have adapted to the local culture and social values very well. The Javanese in Malaysia have adopted Malay culture, they speak Malay and use Malay names.

The presence of the Javanese in Malaysia has become part of the history and contribution to the development of the state of Malaysia. Many political figures have held important positions in the Malaysian government, including Ahmad Zahid Hamidi, previous Deputy Prime Minister of Malaysia, and Muhyiddin Yassin, who served as the 8th Prime Minister of Malaysia. There are also many Malaysian artists of Javanese descent, such as Mohammad Azwan bin Mohammad Nr or better known as Wak Doyok, a businessman and fashion icon and also Herman Tino, the pioneer of dangdut singers in Malaysia.

Most Malaysians of Javanese descent have assimilated into the local Malay culture, and speak Malay as a native tongue and first language rather than the Javanese language of their ancestors. This occurs through usual assimilation, as well as intermarriages with other ethnic groups. This qualifies them as Malays under Malaysian law. The situation is identical with the Javanese in Singapore, where they are considered Malay.

=== Banjarese ===
The Banjar Malaysians are people of full or partial Banjar descent who were born in or immigrated to Malaysia. They form a significant part of Malaysia's population and Malaysian law considers most of them to be Malays. In contrast to the Malay Peninsula, in Sabah the Banjarese are considered a separate ethnic group from the Malays. In Malaysia, many Banjarese are still fluent in Banjarese and have culinary and cultural characteristics similar to their native South Kalimantan. Banjar communities in Malaysia can be found almost all over the country.

The Banjar people have emigrated to the Malay Peninsula hundreds of years ago. The first generation of Banjar people initially cultivated agricultural land. Many of them live in the Bagan Serai and Sungai Manik areas. Following World War II, the Banjarese contributed to the expulsion of communists in Malaysia.

=== Bawean ===
The Bawean Malaysians are people of full or partial Bawean descent who were born in or immigrated to Malaysia. The Bawean ethnicity in Malaysia is not as much as the Minang, Javanese, and Bugis ethnicities. Even so, they are also categorized as Malays. The Bawean or Boyanese people come from Bawean Island, off the north coast of Java. In Malaysia, the Bawean people are better known as the Boyan people or Babian people. The word Boyan actually means driver or gardener, because at the beginning of the migration, many Baweans in Malaysia worked as drivers or gardeners. The lack of documentation and historical records has resulted in the exact time when the Baweans arrived in Malaysia. There are various theories regarding the arrival of the Baweans in the Malay Peninsula. There is an opinion that there was a Bawean named Tok Ayar who arrived in Melaka in 1819. From Melaka, the Baweans also spread to the Klang Valley region of Selangor, such as in the Ampang, Gombak, Balakong and Shah Alam areas. The population census in Malaysia does not categorize the Bawaean or Boyan people as a separate ethnic group but is classified as a Malay ethnicity. The presence of the Bawean people in Malaysia has become a part of history and a contribution to the development of the State of Malaysia.

=== Acehnese ===
The Acehnese Malaysians are people of full or partial Acehnese descent who were born in or immigrated to Malaysia. They form a significant part of Malaysia's population and Malaysian law considers most of them to be Malays. They come from Aceh, northern tip of Sumatra. The existence of the Acehnese in Malaysia has existed for hundreds of years. Aceh's relations with countries in Peninsular Malaysia have existed since the 16th century. The Acehnese, especially in Penang, have contributed a lot to economic growth through the export of their natural wealth, especially pepper. During the war against the Dutch, Aceh made Penang a place for international lobbying, to thwart Aceh from Dutch colonialism. The Lebuh Aceh Mosque is the oldest mosque in Penang. Currently, it is estimated that there are hundreds of thousands of people of Acehnese descent in Malaysia. Many Acehnese in Malaysia have played important and influential roles in Malaysia such as songwriter and singer P. Ramlee and former Minister Sanusi Junid.

== Notable people ==
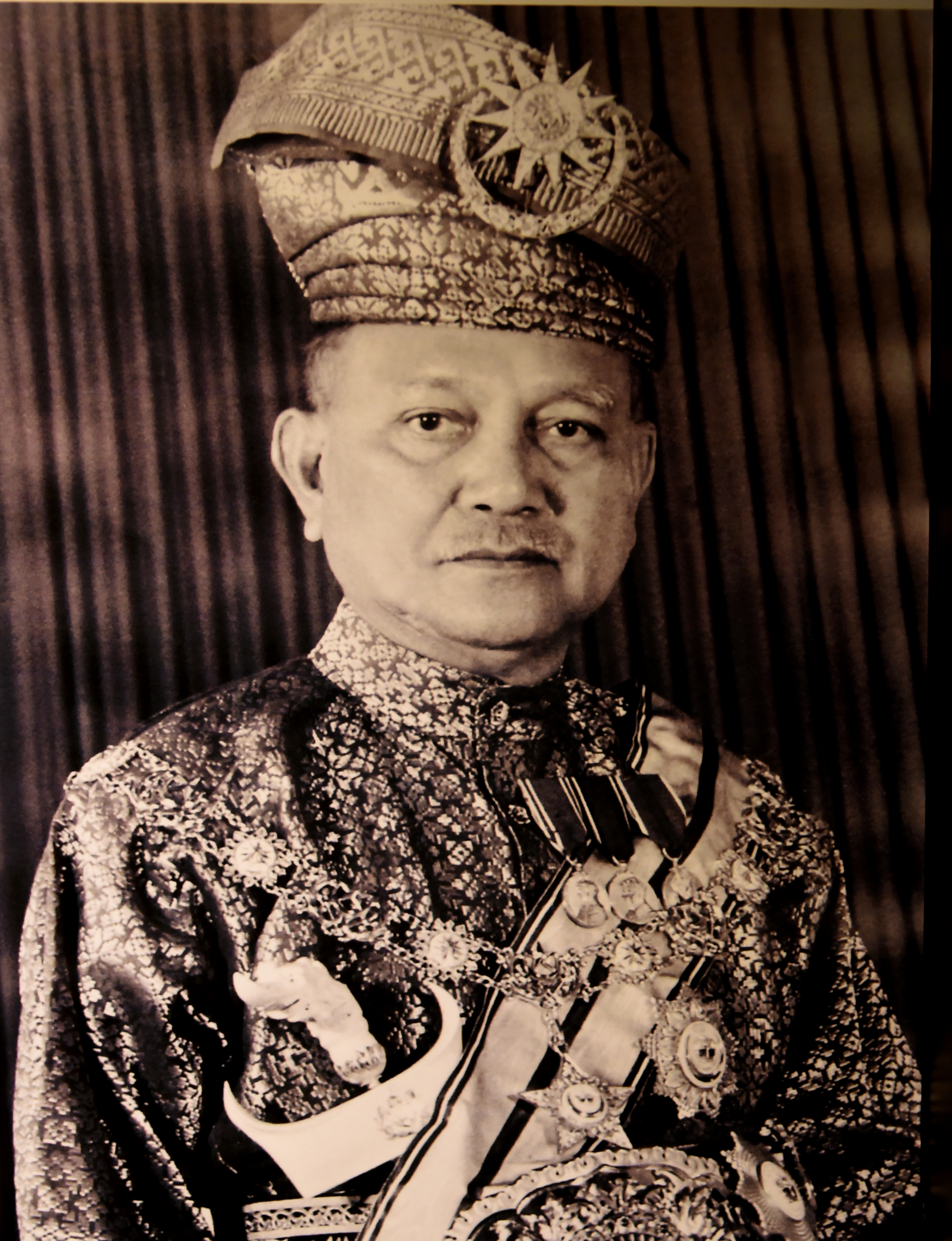
Abdul Rahman of Negeri Sembilan, The first Supreme Ruler or Yang di-Pertuan Agong of the Federation of Malaya

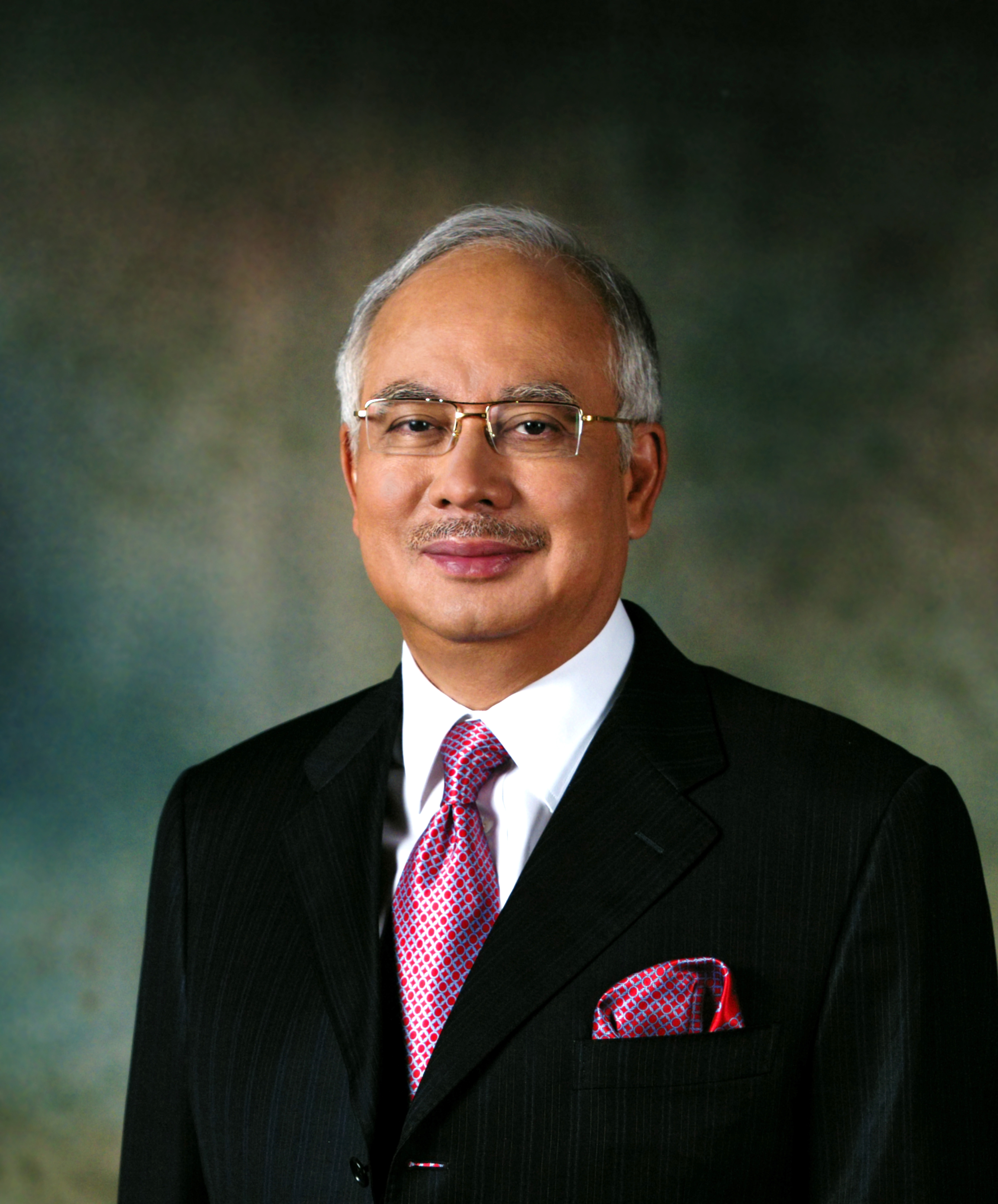
Najib Razak, 6th Prime Minister of Malaysia

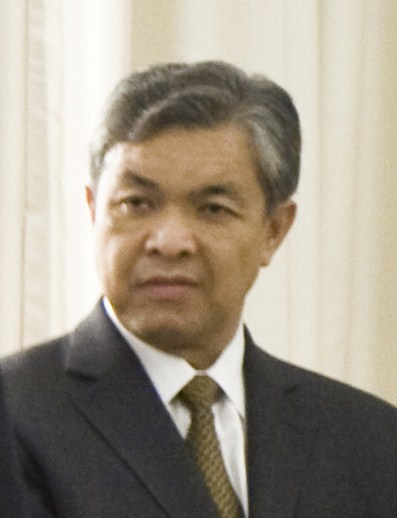
Ahmad Zahid Hamidi, Deputy Prime Minister of Malaysia

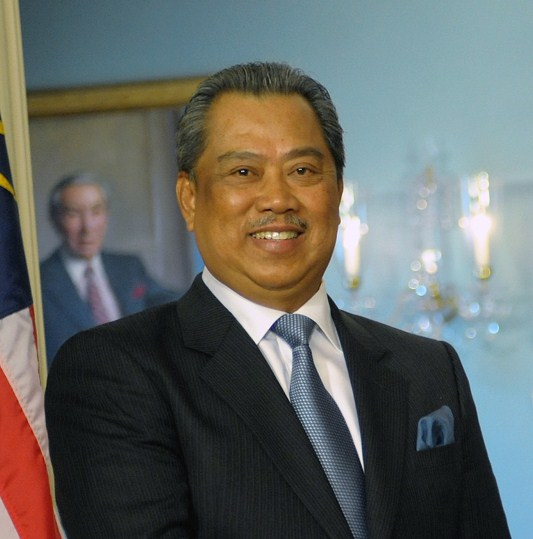
Muhyiddin Yassin, 8th Prime Minister of Malaysia

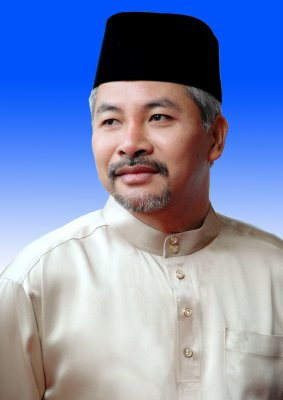
Khir Toyo, Former Chief Minister of the state of Selangor

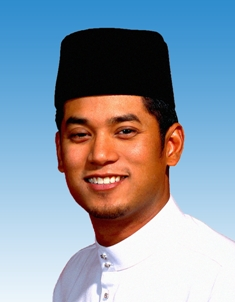
Khairy Jamaluddin, Malaysian Minister

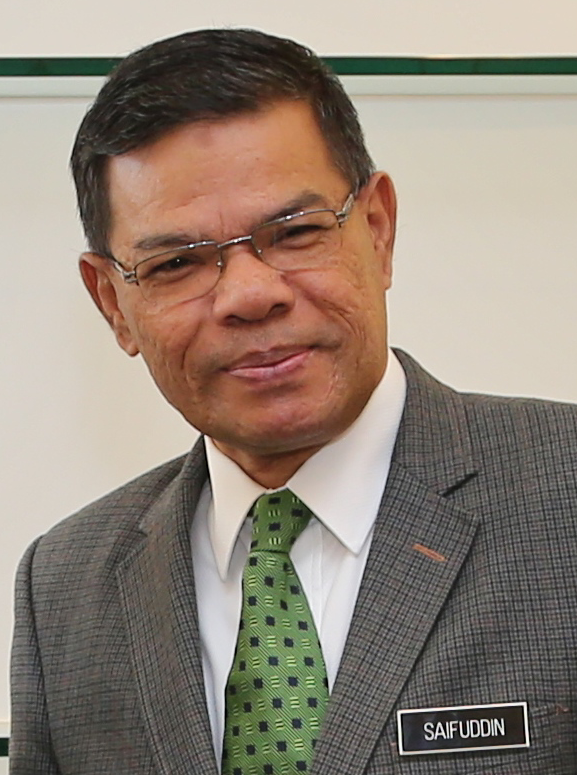
Saifuddin Nasution Ismail, Malaysian Minister

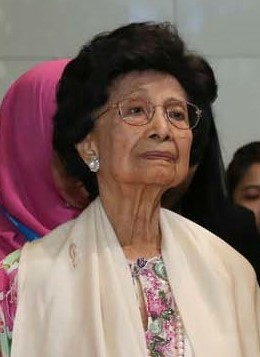
Siti Hasmah Mohamad Ali, Spouse and wife of Former Malaysian Prime Minister Mahathir Mohamad

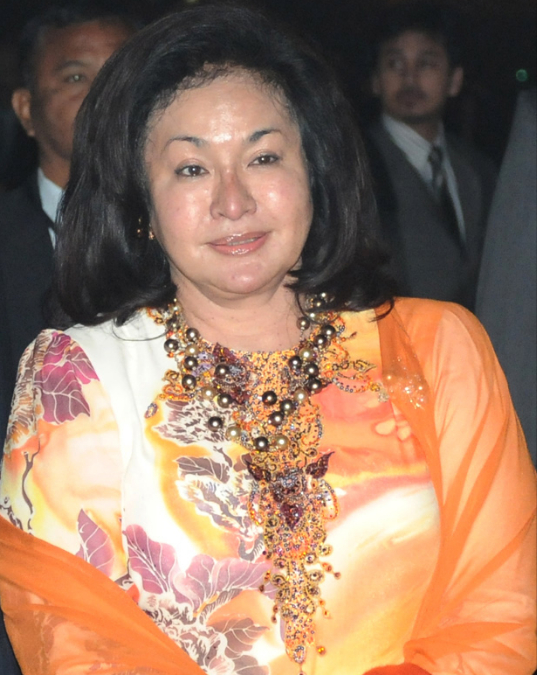
Rosmah Mansor, Spouse and wife of Former Malaysian Prime Minister Najib Razak

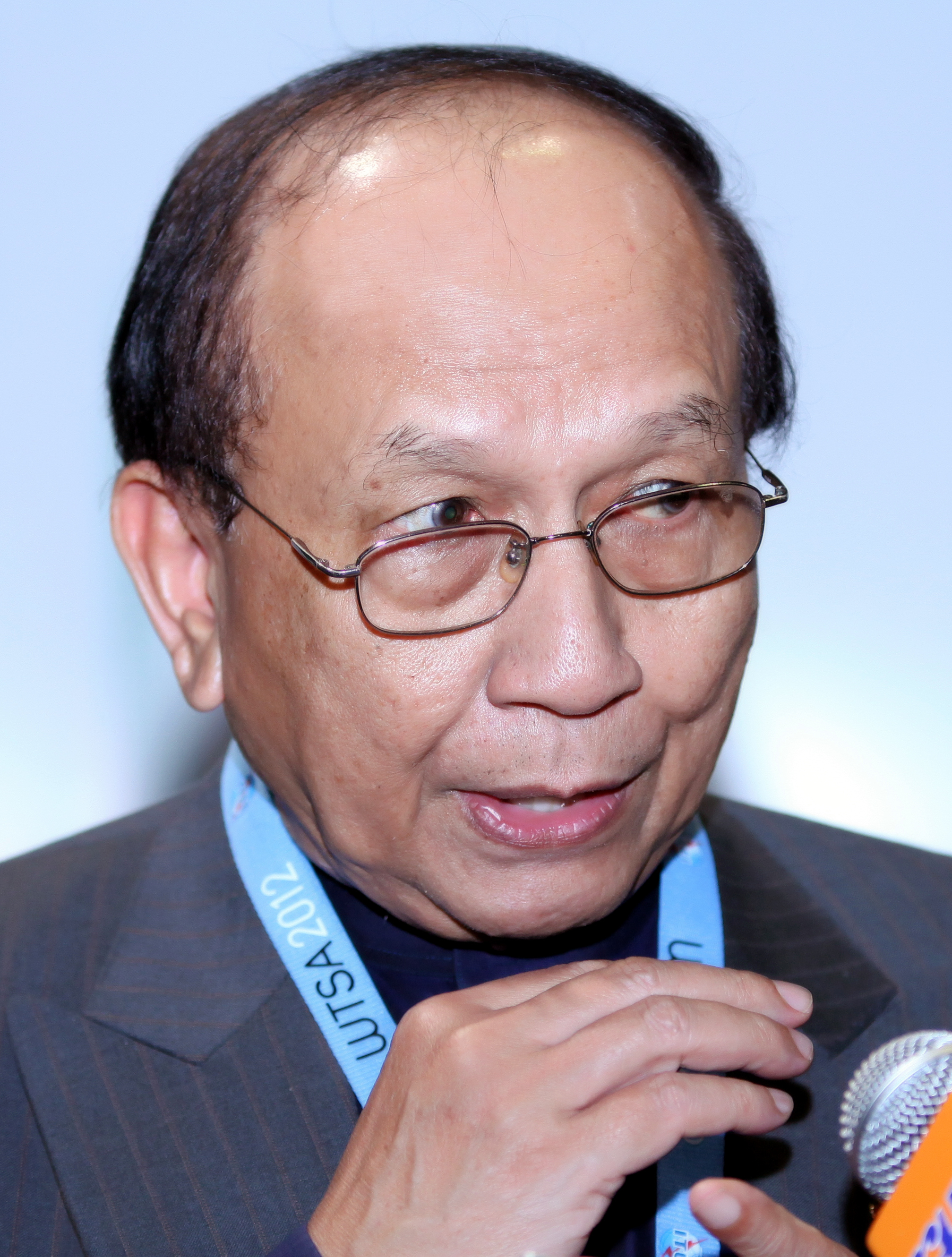
Rais Yatim, 18th President of the Dewan Negara

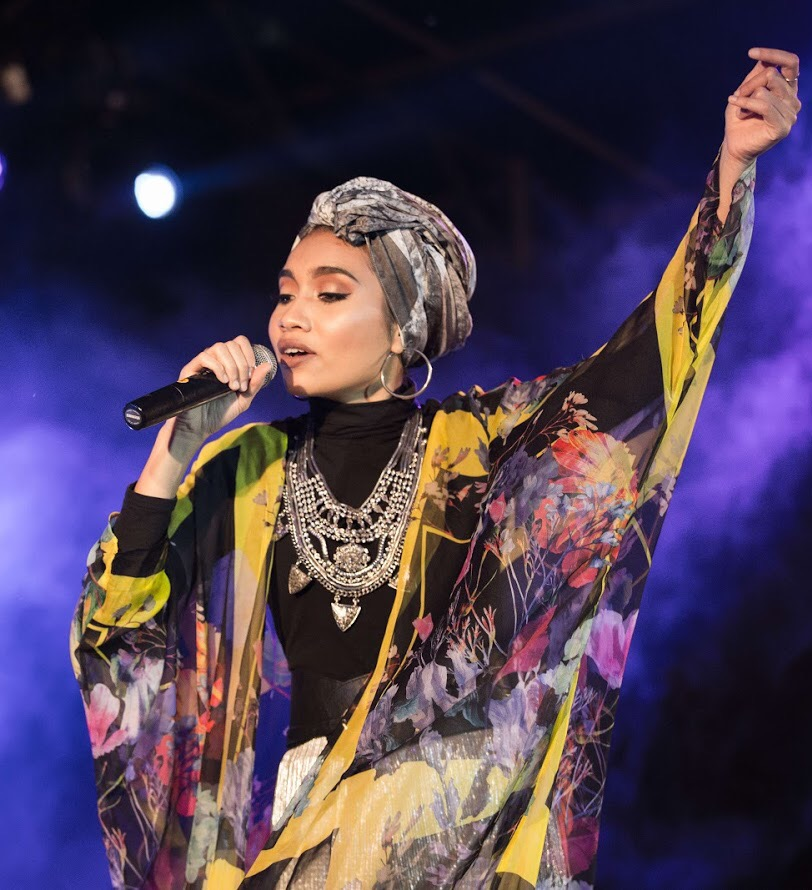
Yuna, Malaysian singer

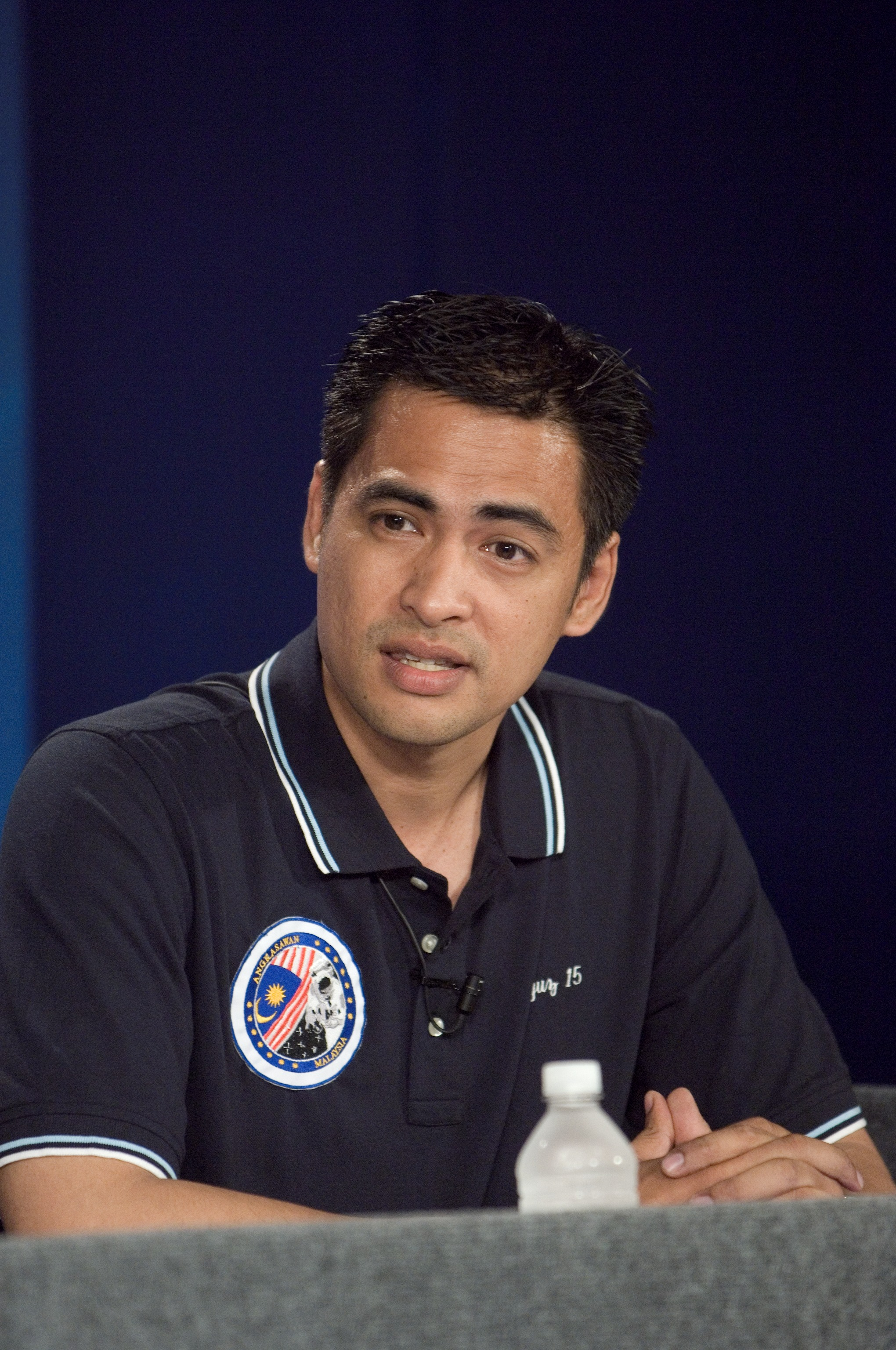
Sheikh Muszaphar Shukor, Malaysia's first astronaut

=== Minangkabau ancestry ===
- Abdul Aziz Shamsuddin, Minister
- Abdul Aziz Zainal, 16th Commander-in-Chief of the Malaysian Armed Forces
- Abdul Rahim Kajai, Writer
- Tuanku Abdul Rahman, The first Malaysian Yang Dipertuan Agong
- Abdul Samad Idris, Politician
- Abdullah CD, Politician
- Adnan Saidi, Malaysian hero
- Ahmad Boestamam, Politician
- Aishah, Singer
- Aishah Ghani, Minister
- Amirsham Abdul Aziz, Minister
- Yam Tuan Antah, Yang Dipertuan Besar Negeri Sembilan
- Aziz Ishak, Minister
- Aznil Nawawi, Actor
- Burhanuddin al-Helmy, Politician
- Dato' Bahaman, Warrior
- Datuk Jannaton, Businessman
- Firdaus Abdullah, Writer
- Ghafar Baba, Deputy Prime Minister
- Ghazali bin Mohd. Yusoff, Businessman
- Ghazali Shafie, Malaysian minister
- Hamdan Sheikh Tahir, The Head of State of Penang
- Hussamuddin Yaacob, Businessman
- Ibrahim Anon, Cartoonist
- Ismail Mohamed Ali, Governor of the Central Bank of Malaysia
- Ja'afar of Negeri Sembilan, The tenth Yang di-Pertuan Agong
- Kamarudin Meranun, Businessman
- Khairy Jamaluddin, Minister
- Khatijah Sidek, Politician
- Marina Mahathir, Novelist
- Melewar of Negeri Sembilan, The first Yamtuan Besar (equivalent to King) of Negri Sembilan
- Mohammad Bakri Omar, 6th Malaysia Police Chief
- Mohamed Hashim Mohamad Ali, 7th Commander-in-Chief of the Malaysian Armed Forces
- Mohamed Taib bin Haji Abdul Samad, Businessman
- Muhammad Saleh Al-Minangkabawi, Mufti
- Mujahid Yusof Rawa, Politician
- Mukhriz Mahathir, Politician
- Nasimuddin Amin, Businessman
- Norma Yaakob, Chief Judge of Malaysia
- Osman Gumanti, Actor
- Rafidah Aziz, the longest serving minister
- Rashid Maidin, Politician
- Razali Ismail, Diplomat
- Rosmah Mansor, First lady of Malaysia
- Rosnani Jamil, Film producer
- Rustam Abdullah Sani, Sociology
- Saiful Bahri, Composer of the Malaysian National Anthem, Negaraku
- Shamsiah Fakeh, Politician
- Shaziman Abu Mansor, Minister
- Sheikh Muszaphar Shukor, Malaysian first astronaut
- Siti Hasmah Mohamad Ali, First lady of Malaysia
- Tahir bin Jalaluddin, Islamic scholar
- Tunku Abdullah, Businessman
- Tunku Imran, Businessman
- Tunku Naquiyuddin, Businessman
- Utsman bin Abdullah, Muslim ulama
- U-Wei Haji Saari, Film director
- Yusof Rawa, Politician
- Zainal Abidin bin Ahmad, Writer
- Zahrain Mohamed Hashim, Diplomat
- Zaquan Adha Abdul Radzak, Football player

=== Bugis ancestry ===
- Abu Bakar of Johor, the 21st sultan of the Johor Sultanate in Malaysia
- Ma'mun Sulaiman, Politician.
- Muhyiddin Yassin, Deputy Prime Minister of Malaysia
- Najib Razak, 6th Prime Minister of Malaysia.
- Nazir Razak, Banker.
- Abdul Razak Hussein, 2nd Prime Minister of Malaysia
- Sultan Salehuddin Shah ibni Almarhum Opu Daeng Chelak, the 1st sultan of the Sultan of Selangor in Malaysia.
- Ziana Zain, Malaysian singer.
- Daeng Sanusi Daeng Mariok, Malaysian Politician.
- Andi Muhammad Suryady Bandy, Sabah State Assistant Minister of Youth and Sports.
- Lisa Surihani, Malaysian actress, model, television host and commercial model.
- Yuna, Malaysian singer-songwriter

=== Javanese ancestry ===
- Herman Tino, Dangdut singer
- Wak Doyok, Model and artist
- Djamal Tukimin, Writer
- Ahmad Zahid Hamidi, Minister
- Muhyiddin Yassin, 8th Prime Minister of Malaysia
- Sahruddin Jamal, Former First Minister of Johor
- Aziz Sattar, Actor

=== Banjarese ancestry ===
- Mohamed Khaled Nordin, 15th First Minister of Johor and Member of the Supreme Council of UMNO
- Abdul Latiff Ahmad, Former Deputy Minister of Defense and Member of Parliament
- Ahmad Husni Hanadzlah, Former Minister of Finance II and Member of Parliament for Tambun-BN/UMNO
- Hassan Bin Shukri, Former Senator, Member of the Senate, and Former Deputy President of PAS
- Sabran Bin Asmawi, Former member of parliament
- Hassan Adli Bin Mohd Arsyad, Former Minister of Local Government and Federal Territories-BN-PAS, Former Deputy President of PAS
- Mohd Puad Zarkashi, Former Deputy Minister of Education and Member of Parliament for Batu Pahat-BN/UMNO
- Badrianshah Mohd Hamdi, Member of Parliament for Lembah Pantai (Sabah)
- Saloma, Singer and actress.
- Sarimah Ibrahim, Actress, television host and radio announcer.
- Jamal Abdillah, Singer and actor.
- Ramly Bin Mokni, Founder Ramly Burger
- Nordin Bin Kadri, Academic figures
- Abdul Rahim Mohd Noor, Police Chief 1994–1999
- Musa Hassan, Police Chief 2006–2010
- Aliff Shukri Kamaruzzaman, Entrepreneur and singer
- Sarimah Ibrahim, Artist
- Jalaluddin Hassan, Actor and television host
- Mubarak Majid, Actor
- Shuib Sepahtu, Artist
- Zack Idris, Actor
- Jamal Abdillah, Pop singer and actor

=== Mandailing ancestry ===
- Saifuddin Nasution Ismail, Minister

== See also ==
- Indonesia–Malaysia relations
- Native Indonesians
- Demographics of Malaysia
- Indonesian citizens in Malaysia
