= Sekolah Menengah Kebangsaan Anderson =

School in Ipoh, Perak, Malaysia

Coordinates: 4.6058794°N 101.0903142°E

Anderson School Ipoh
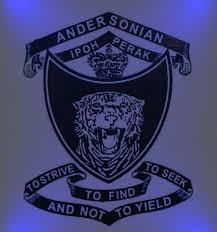

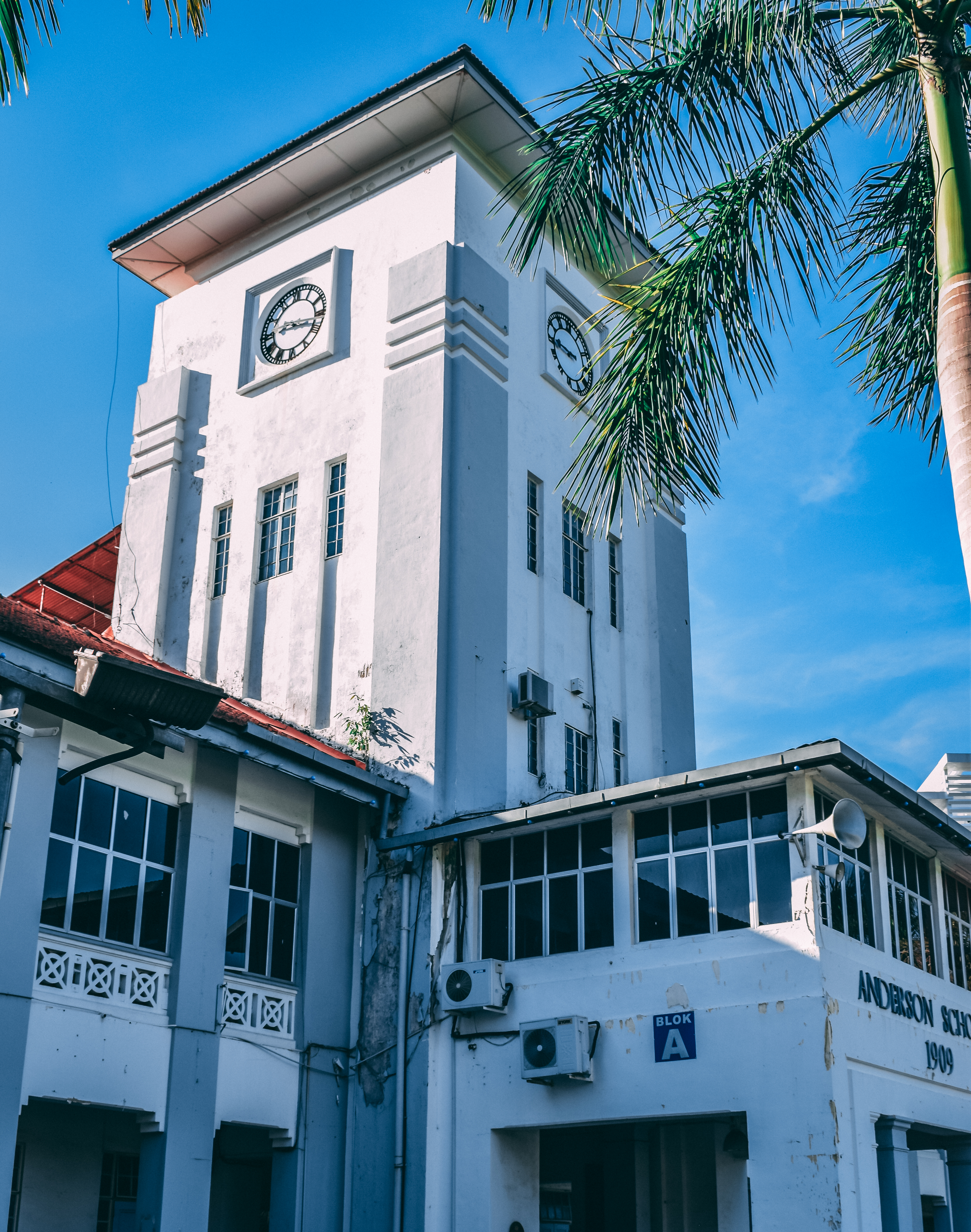
- Ipoh, Perak; Malaysia

Information
- Type: All-boys secondary school
- Motto: To Strive, To Seek, To Find and Not to Yield
- Established: 6 February 1909
- School district: North Kinta
- Session: Double Session
- Principal: Shamshahimi Harun
- Grades: Form 1 - 6
- Gender: Male; Co-educational (Form 6)
- Enrollment: Over 1,000
- Colours: White and Blue
- Feeder schools: SK Cator Avenue, Ipoh; SK Sri Kinta, Ipoh
- Website: smkanderson.edu.my

Anderson School Ipoh, is a Malaysian government secondary school located on Jalan Raja Ashman Shah (formerly Jalan Hospital).

It was established during the British occupation in Malaya on 6 February 1909.

Anderson School Ipoh had 813 students in the morning session and 176 students in the afternoon session, bringing the total number of students to 989 as of 3 April 2018.

There were 46 male and 72 female teachers, bringing the total number of teachers to 118 as of 2018.

== History ==
The name "Anderson" was taken after the British High Commissioner in Malaya at that time (also the Governor of the Straits Settlements), Sir John Anderson. Anderson School was created to provide opportunities for Malay students who did not have the opportunity to enter Malay College Kuala Kangsar. It also became an alternative for Malay parents who do not wish to send their sons to Anglo-Chinese School as well as St. Michael's Institution, which are the then two Christian-dominated English-medium schools in Ipoh.

Lt. Col. J. H, Tyte, senior assistant of administration or first vice-principal at Victoria Institution was appointed as the first headmaster. He was assisted by Mr. E. C. Smith who became its inaugural Vice Principal for Administration. The school's early pioneer teachers consists of a trained teacher and five senior Victoria Institution students. The first school building was designed by local architects, namely Mr. C. H. Labrooy and was firstly located on Jalan Douglas. The old school building is now used as the Perak Islamic Affairs Religious Office (Pejabat Agama Perak).

On 6 February 2009, SMK Anderson celebrated its centenary with the Sultan of Perak, Sultan Azlan Shah as the royal guest of honour. Also on the move was the Raja Permaisuri Perak, Tuanku Bainun; Raja Di-Hilir of Perak, Raja Jaafar Raja Muda Musa; Raja Puan Muda Perak, Raja Nor Mahani Raja Shahar Shah and the 11th Menteri Besar of Perak, Datuk Dr. Zambry Abdul Kadir.

Sekolah Menengah Kebangsaan Anderson (SMK) Anderson celebrated the 100th anniversary of the annual sports event through the Karnival Sukan 100-tahun on 7 and 8 July 2018. The Kejohanan Olahraga Kali Ke-100 was held on 7 July 2018, the patron of which is DYTM Raja Jaafar Bin Raja Muda Musa and Dato' Seri Ahmad Faizal Azumu. The Fun Ride event involving 25 km cycling and Majils Makan Malam Amal were held the following day, 8 July 2018.

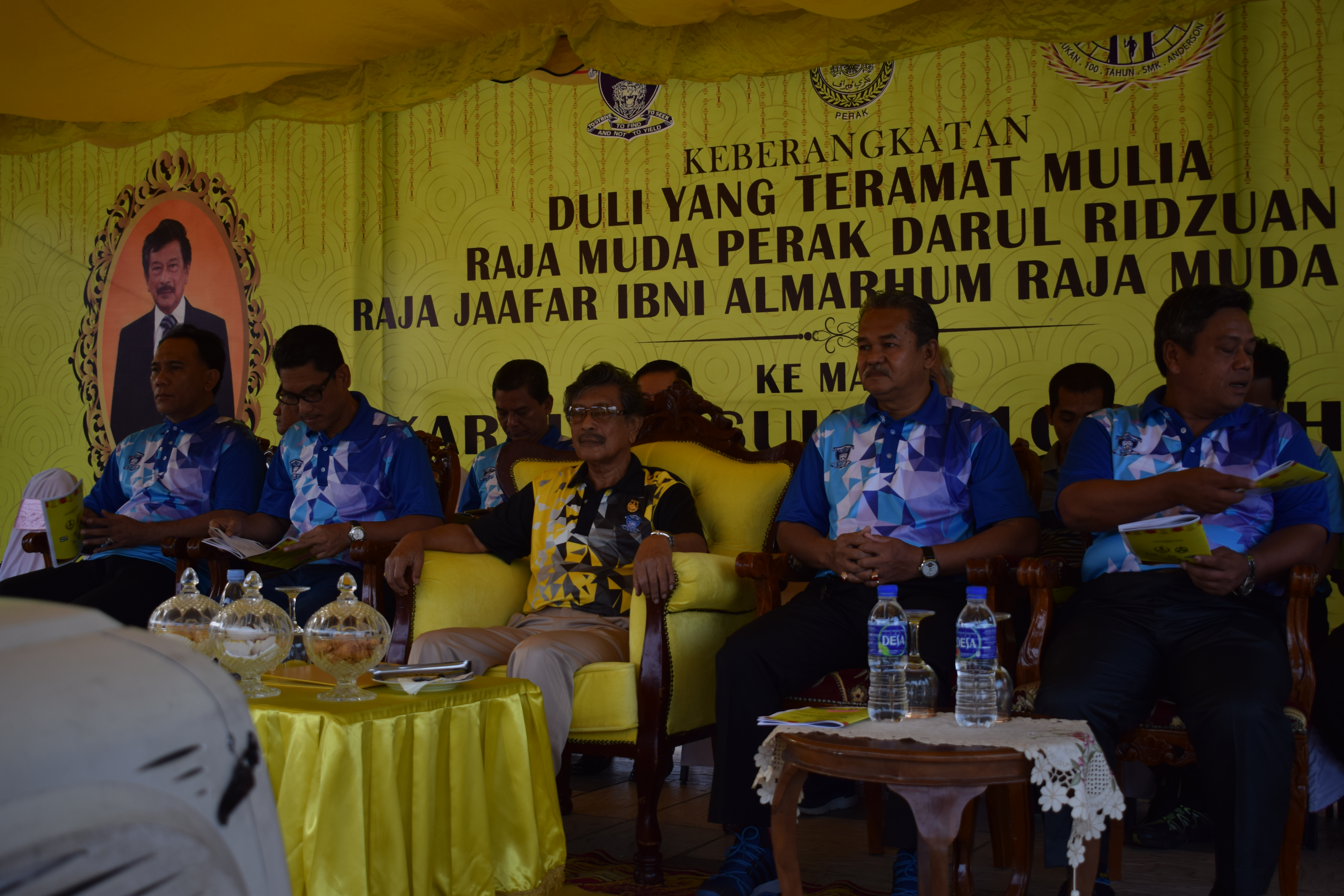
100th Annual Sports Day

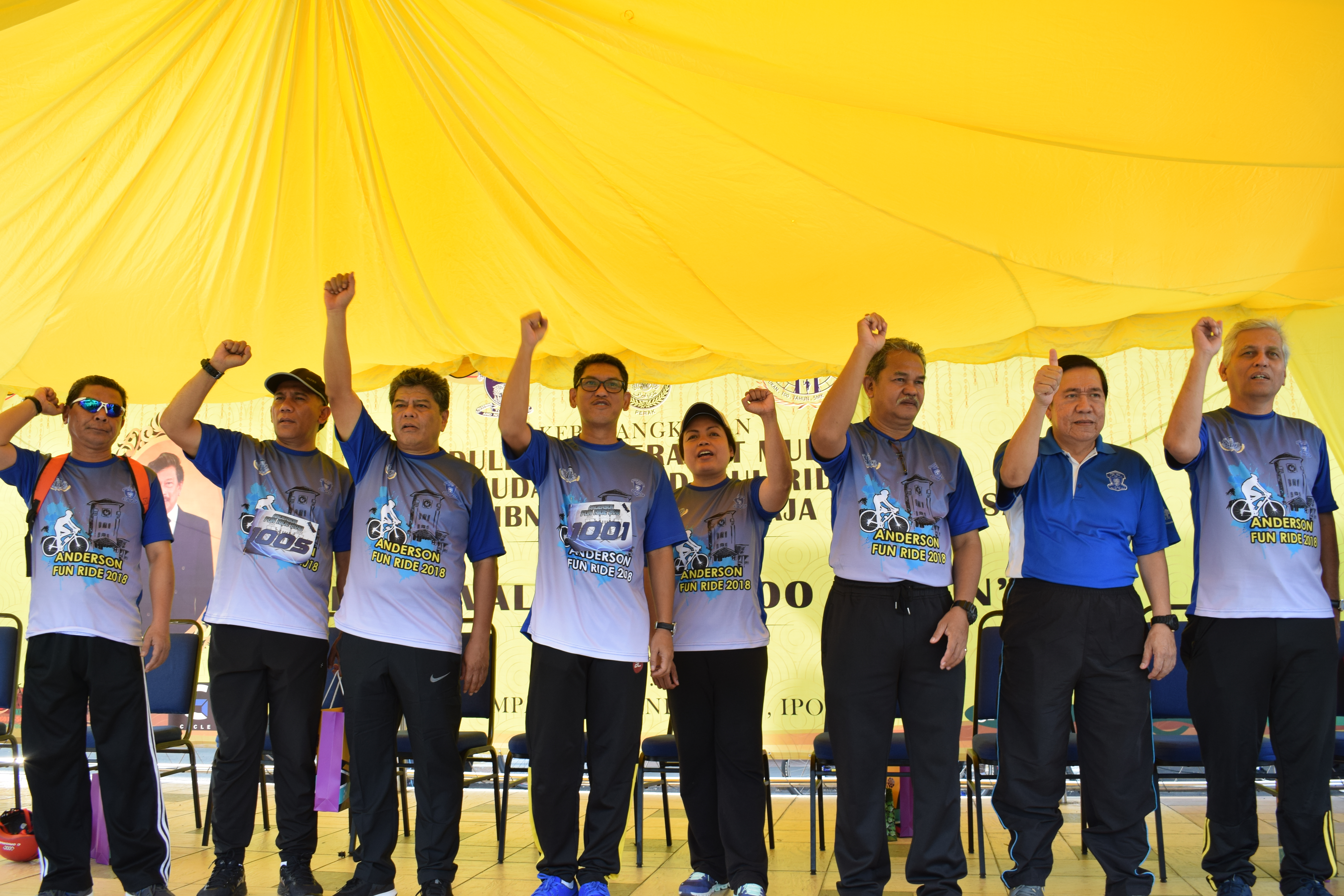
Fun Ride 2018

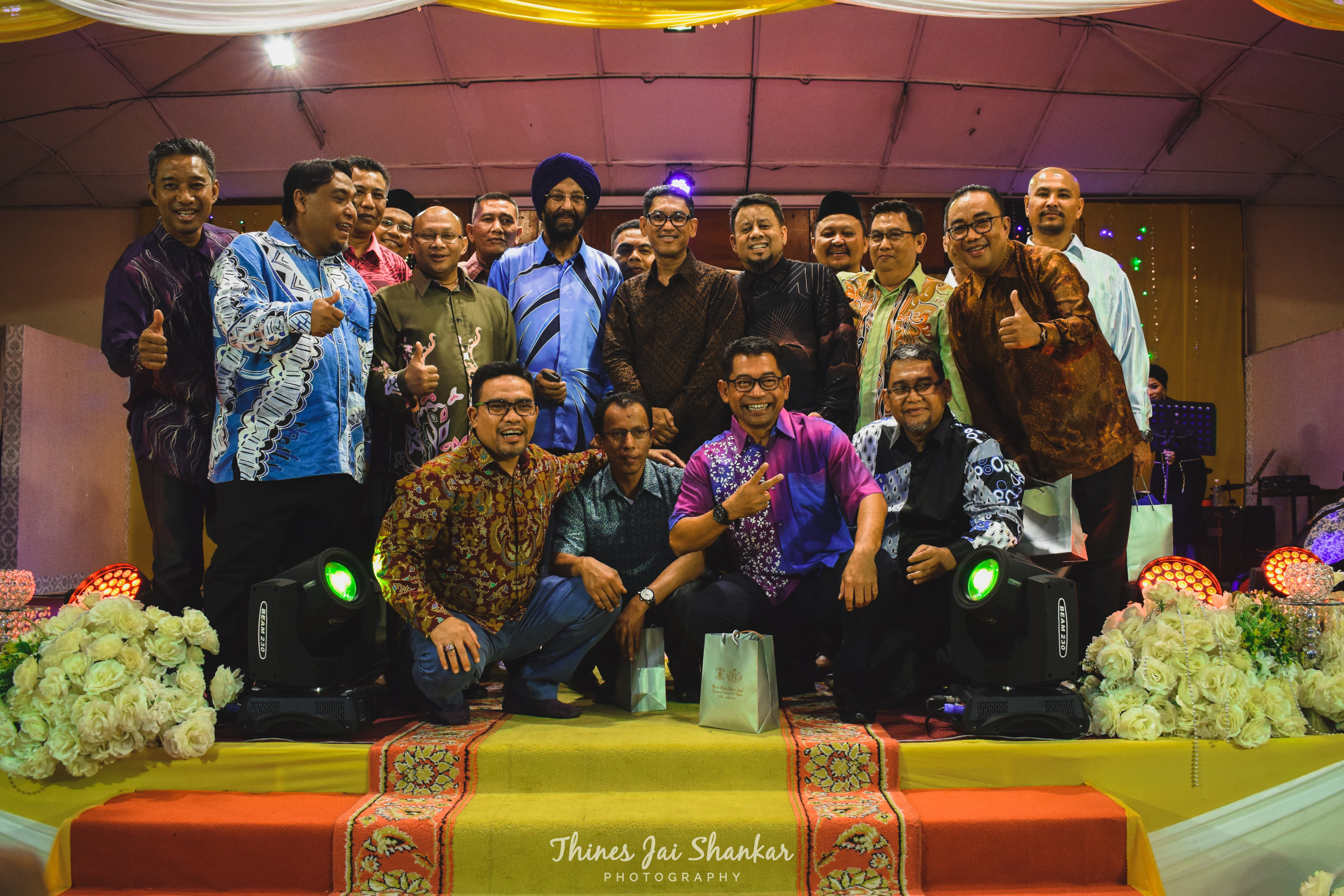
Makan Malam Amal 2018

== Anderson School Prefectorial Board ==
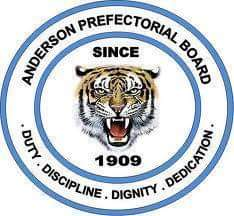
Anderson School Prefectorial Board logo

Anderson School Ipoh has a prefectorial board that has operated for a century. The board, whose members are known as prefects, follows specific traditions and selection processes. Head Prefects are selected through a voting system involving prefects and teachers. In 2008, the 2007–2008 cohort of prefects established a logo and a motto for the board.

== Anderson School Editorial Board ==
Anderson School Editorial Board publishes the yearbook titled The Andersonian annually to commemorate the past year of the school. Interesting facts and pictures are published in the yearbook to cherish the memories of the past year. The yearbook is bought by the students and teachers. The editorial board consists of students helping to take pictures of events and writing articles for the yearbook. In 2018, QR codes were introduced to the yearbook which, when scanned, redirect to YouTube videos highlighting the event. A theme is chosen every year for the yearbook. In 2018, Anderson School celebrated its 100th Sports Day; the 2018 edition yearbook was theme was 'Sporting Glory'.

== Notable alumni ==
The alumni or old boys of the school are or may be affiliated with ASOBA, the Anderson School Old Boys' Association. The current president of the association is Dato' Seri Hj. Abdul Azim b. Dato' Mohd Zabidi.

Notable alumni include:

1. Tun (Dr) Haji Ahmad Sarji Abdul Hamid – 9th Chief Secretary to the Government of Malaysia
2. Tunku Naquiyuddin - Tunku Laxamana of Negeri Sembilan
3. Ahmad Boestamam – freedom fighter, politician and was the founding president of Parti Rakyat Malaysia and Parti Marhaen Malaysia
4. Chan Sek Keong – Ketua Hakim Singapura (Chief Justice of the Republic of Singapore)
5. Dato' Mohammad Nor Khalid (Lat) – Malaysian cartoonist
6. Tun S. Samy Vellu – politician and 7th President of the Malaysian Indian Congress
7. Dr. Wong Jeh Shyan – former-CEO of CommerceNet Singapore
8. Tengku Razaleigh Hamzah - politician, 4th Minister of Finance and also former Minister of Trade and Industry
9. Dato' Sivarraajh Chandran – politician and former Member of Parliament for Cameron Highlands
10. Dato' Seri Ahmad Faizal Azumu – politician, 12th and 13th Menteri Besar of Perak and also former Minister of Youth and Sports
11. Dato' Panglima Bukit Gantang Tan Sri Abdul Wahab Toh Muda Abdul Aziz – 1st Menteri Besar of Perak
12. Tan Sri Mohd Yunus Mohd Tasi – 9th Chief of Royal Malaysian Air Force
13. Tun Hanif Omar - 4th Inspector-General of Royal Malaysia Police

== Student demographics ==
Student demographics as of 2018
Grades/ Race	Total Class	Malay	Chinese	Indian	Others	Total
Form 1	9	143	7	28	0	178
Form 2	8	111	5	34	0	150
Form 3	8	130	7	27	0	164
Form 4	7	120	8	37	0	165
Form 5	7	125	20	41	0	186
Form 6 (Lower)	6	21	33	10		64
Form 6 (Upper)	6	21	39	33	0	82
Total	51	671	119	119	0	989

== Extra-curricular activities ==
=== Sport Houses ===
The student body is currently sorted into six sport houses. Students represent their sport houses in the school's annual Sports Day competitions. The school celebrated its 100th year Sports Day on 7 July 2018. One of the earlier sport houses, Sultan, was introduced to honour His Royal Highness, the Sultan of Perak. Named after the Anderson's longest serving principal, Mr. C.F.C. Ayre, is Ayre. The red house of Anderson, Whitfield was named after another principal who made significant changes, Mr. L. D. Whitfield. Andersonians are very proud of their alma mater. Thus they named a sport house School and took Anderson's school colour. Parr was named after Colonel C.W.C. Parr, the British Resident of Perak in 1923. The High Commissioner, Sir John Anderson, whom the school was named after, unveiled the memorial which was erected in memory of J.W.W Birch, Perak's first British Resident. In honour of this, a sport house took the name Birch.

House	House color
Sultan	
Whitfield	
School	
Ayre	
Parr	
Birch	

== Trivia ==
- Filming of the movie, Talentime directed by Yasmin Ahmad, was held in SMK Anderson's Hall in August 2008.
