= Labu Sayong =

Traditional earthenware bottle gourd-shape water jar

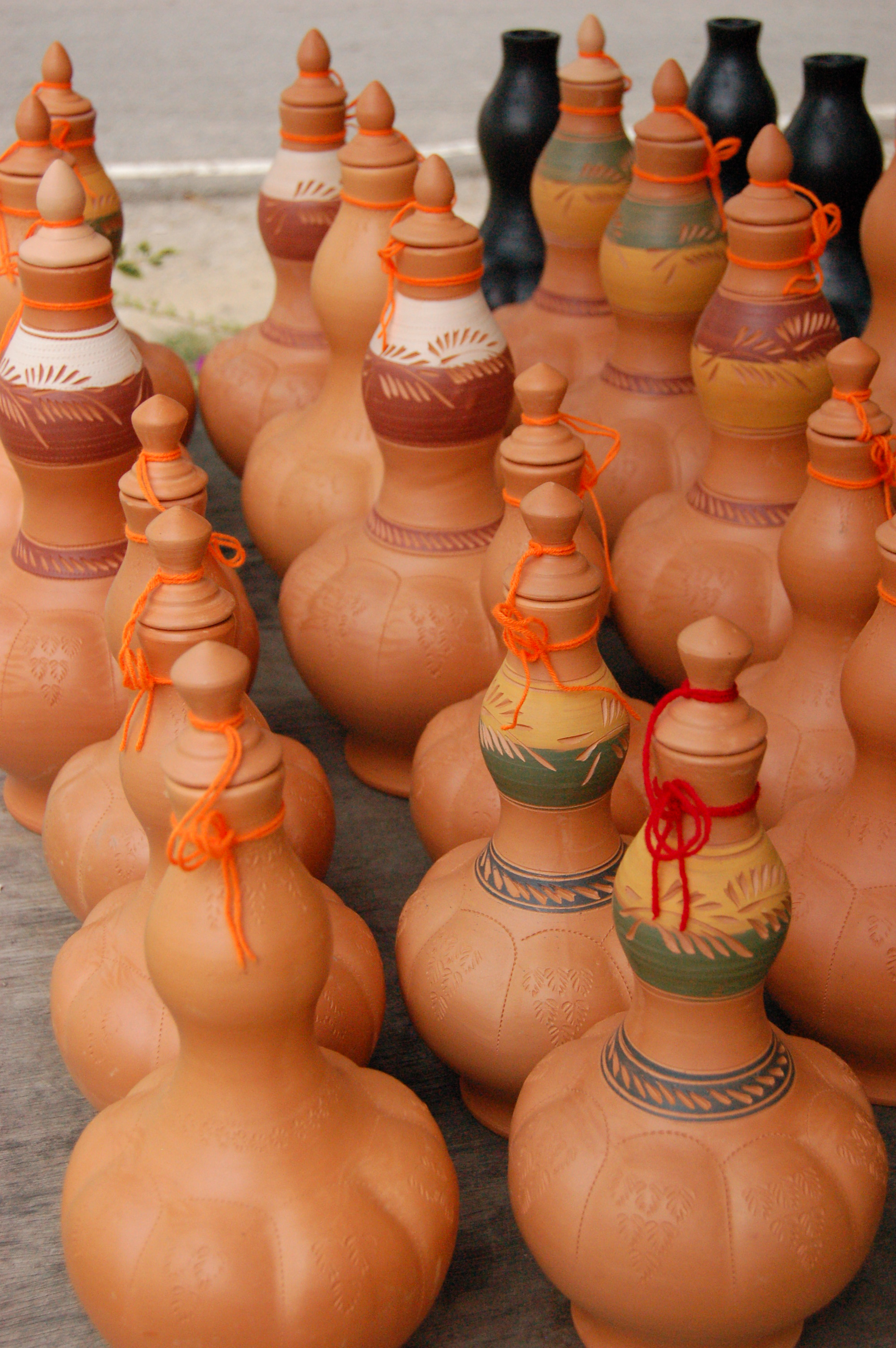
A readily finished Labu Sayong, available in black or brown.

Labu Sayong is a pottery and earthenware, bottle gourd-shaped water pitcher from Sayong, a subdistrict located about 10 kilometres from Kuala Kangsar, Perak. In particular, the pitcher is manufactured by the Kampung Kepala Bendang residents. The village is where the industry originated as the abundance of raw materials, such as clay that are available from the village; the labu sayong making industry has expanded among the heirs of the original potters to surrounding villages in the Kuala Kangsar district from here on out.

The carving motifs are often inspired by traditional elements, especially flowers such as tanjung flowers, padi, senduduk, star anise, cloves and bamboo shoots. The handicraft, which is made from clay, is carefully shaped and carved, has become a part of the art heritage of Kuala Kangsar and the cultural history of Perak and Malaysia as well. It is also associated with a dance called the sayong.

== Etymology ==
The word Labu means pumpkin in Malay; it is also a local name for the bottle gourd. Sayong refers to the name of the village and subdistrict, where it is a home of the Labu Sayong production, located 10 kilometres from Kuala Kangsar in Perak.

== History ==
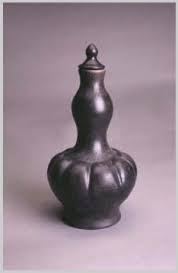
The ebony-coloured Labu Sayong, primarily used to store water and keep the water inside it stays cold.

The history of Labu Sayong production dates back to the prehistoric age to the reign of Sultan Iskandar Zulkarnain as the 15th Sultan of Perak from 1752 to 1765. The Labu Sayong is said to be the result of innovation from replacing empty gourds used to fill water among the local community; the habit of this community to become skilled in using soil as a building material led to attempts to create gourd-like items from the same material. The water pitcher's shape is also inspired by the shape of a standing heron seen from the front.

There are two figures who are strongly associated with the pioneering of the water gourd art: Nila Hitam, a Malay woman born in Kampung Kepala Bendang itself, and Tok Kaluk, a Minangkabau blacksmith from Sumatra who is said to have introduced the creation of pottery from clay around 1810 during the reign of Sultan Abdul Malik Mansur Shah, whose skills earned the sultan's trust to the point of being granted a plot of land in the same village.

The Labu Sayong making using modern molds was introduced by the Malaysian Handicraft Development Corporation in 1975, allowing for more production, bulk production and lower costs. However, this modern technique has raised concerns among some artisans over the quality of the final product (easily broken, easily contaminated by chemicals, etc.) and the possibility of jeopardizing the sales of the traditionally hand-made labu sayong.

== Making process ==
The Labu Sayong making enterprise that makes the handicraft belongs to the ceramic manufacturing industry. The passage of time has revolutionized its manufacturing method from traditional to modern.

=== Traditional ===
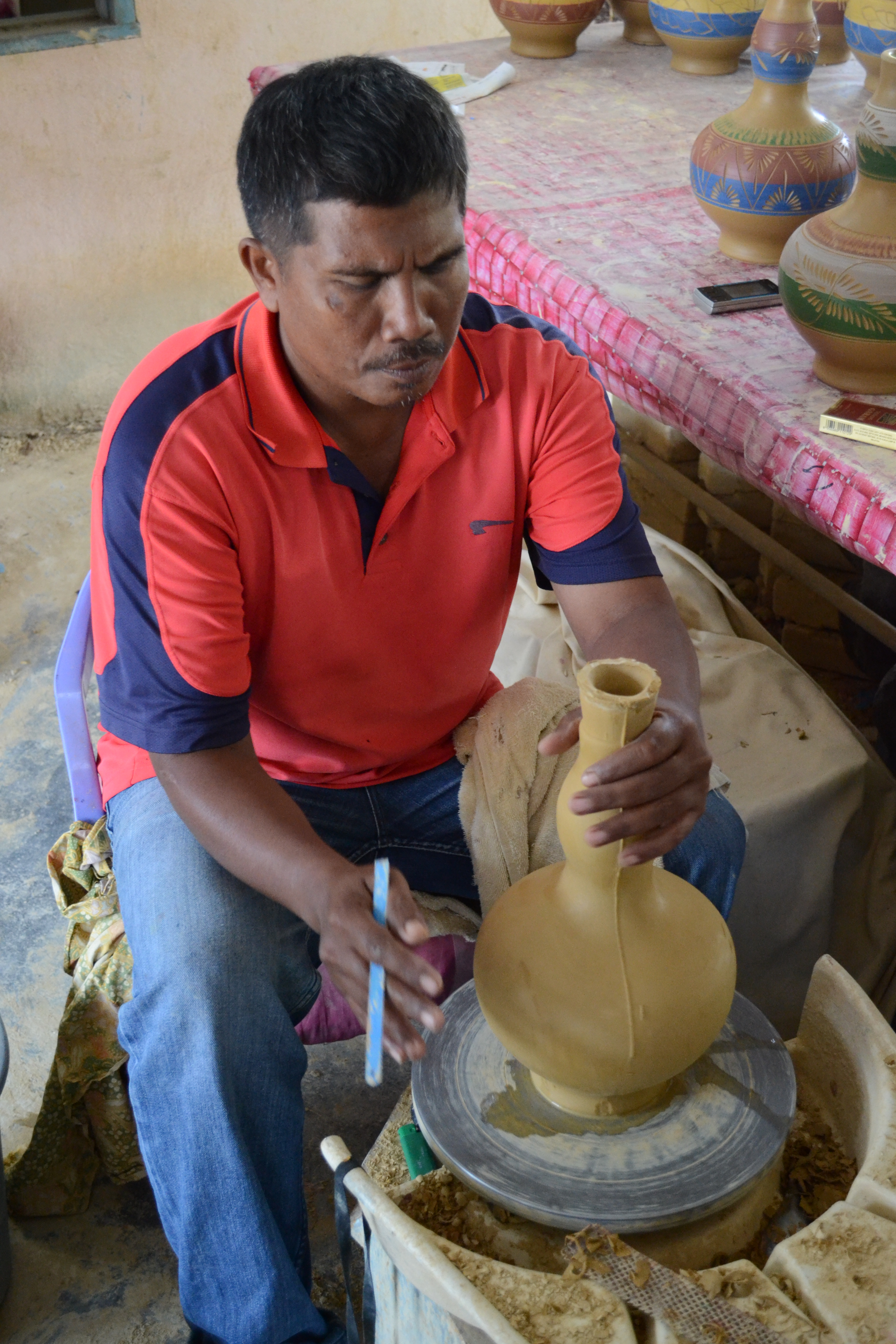
The traditional making process of Labu Sayong.

The traditional Labu Sayong are made by carefully shaping clay and letting it harden for a while. The pitcher's surface is carved by pressing it with pieces of 'stamp wood' to produce various embossed patterns. The gourd then baked at the higher temperature.

The pitchers that have had enough time to baked are then moved to a pile of rice husks for the blackening process. The heat accumulated in the hot gourd burns the husks indirectly reducing the oxygen content and producing a thick smoke; The smoke releases carbon particles which blacken the gourd's body. This process is done for about 5 minutes. The blackness degree of Labu Sayong also depends on the temperature of the fire that needs to be maintained before "scalding" for ideal blackening, which is from the original temperature range of between 850 °C to 900 °C controlled through the usage of wood or bamboo as the main fuel, dropping to around 450 °C to 500 °C.

=== Modern ===
The modern labu sayong making still maintains the traditional techniques of shaping the pitcher but uses modern machinery and technology for other processes such as drying and burning. However, the traditional carving motifs are still retained as a distinctive feature of the gourd.

== Motifs and patterns ==
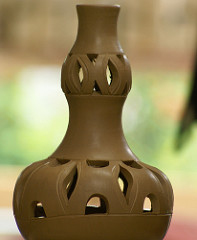
A labu sayong with a modern carving style.

Labu sayong has three main parts that meet, namely "lips", "neck" and "body", with each symbolizing the upper, middle and lower realms in Malay cosmology.

There are three main motifs that can be identified based on features that stand out from each other:

- pucuk rebung - a most common motif with 27 types have been identified
- bunga padi - 8 types have been identified
- pecah matahari - a motif imitating the scene of scattered sunlight, with 7 types have been identified

Besides of these motifs, modern geometrical patterns also used in the pitcher's making.

== Properties ==
=== Heat conduction ===
The labu sayong has fine pores on the surface that are capable of absorbing water through capillary action so that the surface feels wet although it is not visible to the naked eye. This water diffusion increases the surface area which allows heat transfer by direct evaporation until it reaches a stable value cooling the water stored in the flask. The gourd's property was further studied by the Universiti Sains Malaysia (USM) where the gourd can be applied together with mechanical ventilation in an "evaporative cooling window system" to control room temperature, thus reducing the temperature significantly by around 3 °C.

=== Medicinal values ===
The water stored inside the labu sayong also known for its medicinal values. For instance, it is used as an antidote for all types of diseases, especially fever, and potentially helps refreshed the body.

== In the media ==
Labu Sayong became the subject matter in 1983 documentary film of the same title, produced by Filem Negara Malaysia. In 2020, TV3's magazine documentary program, Majalah 3 highlighted the history and the making of the pitcher.

== Bibliography ==
- Siti Zainon Ismail (1986). Rekabentuk kraftangan Melayu tradisi. Kuala Lumpur, Malaysia: Dewan Bahasa dan Pustaka. ASIN B0DLT5P6MJ.
- Ploysri Porananond (2016). Tourism and Monarchy in Southeast Asia. Cambridge Scholars Publishing. ISBN 978-1443816618.
- Azmi Arifin; Muhamad Luthfi Abdul Rahman; Tarmiji Masron (2010). "Warisan Tembikar Labu Sayong di Kuala Kangsar, Perak: Sejarah, Perkembangan dan Masa Depan". Sari - Jurnal Alam Dan Tamadun Melayu. 28. National University of Malaysia. Archived from the original on 4 November 2024.
- Azmi Arifin (2015). "Traditional Malay Pottery of Kuala Kangsar: Its History and Development" (PDF). Malaysia Research. 33 (2): 113–133. Archived from the original (PDF) on 24 October 2019 – via Universiti Sains Malaysia.
- Zainul Abidin Hassan (1986). "Satu Kajian Teori Tentang Penyejukan Air di dalam Labu Sayung" (PDF). Pertanika. 9 (3). Universiti Pertanian Malaysia: 431–439. Archived from the original (PDF) on 2011-12-15.
- Abdul Jalil; Oskar Hassan; Norhidayah Md Zainuddin; Hamdzun Haron (2013). "Innovation of Blackening Labu Sayong". Jurnal Teknologi. 66 (1). Universiti Teknologi Malaysia: 63–67. doi:10.11113/jt.v66.2124.
- Salwa Ayob (2019). "Tembikar Melayu Tradisi Sayong: Pemerian Asal Usul, Intipati Bentuk, Motif Dan Rupa". Journal of Applied Arts. 1 (1). Sultan Idris Education University: 73–77.
- Zumahiran Kamaruddin (24 June 2013). "Sustainability of Malay Traditional Craft and Craftmanship as Cultural Heritage in Kuala Kangsar, Perak, Malaysia". Journal of Architecture, Planning and Construction Management. 3 (1). International Islamic University Malaysia. doi:10.31436/japcm.v3i1.523.
