= Panglima Bukit Gantang =

Malaysian politician (1905–1959)

Yang Berbahagia Dato' Panglima Bukit Gantang Tan Sri Dato' Seri Abdul Wahab Abdul Aziz PMN SPCM
- عبدالوهاب

1st Menteri Besar of Perak
- In office 1 February 1948 – 1 August 1957
- Monarch: Yussuf Izzuddin Shah
- Preceded by: Position established
- Succeeded by: Mohamed Ghazali Jawi

Personal details
- Born: 4 May 1905 Sayong, Kuala Kangsar, Perak, British Malaya (now Malaysia)
- Died: 16 April 1959 (aged 53) Canning Garden Estate, Ipoh, Perak, Malaya (now Malaysia)
- Party: UMNO (1946–1953); NAP (1953–1959)
- Parent(s): Toh Muda Abdul Aziz (father); Teh Halimah (mother)
- Education: SMK Anderson
- Occupation: Politician; barrister

Tan Sri Dato' Seri Haji Abdul Wahab bin Toh Muda Abdul Aziz (4 May 1905 – 15 April 1959), also known by his title Dato' Panglima Bukit Gantang, was a Malaysian nationalist politician and barrister who became the 1st Menteri Besar of Perak from 1 February 1948 to 1 August 1957 and the first Secretary General of UMNO from 1946 to 1947. He was granted the Orang Besar Lapan title of Panglima Bukit Gantang, indicating that he was descended from monarchy and aristocracy in Perak. Notably, when he was admitted to the English Bar in 1930, he became the first Malay lawyer in the United Kingdom.

== Early life and education ==
On 4 May 1905, Abdul Wahab was born in Sayong, Kuala Kangsar District. Teh Halimah, his mother, is the sole child of Dato Setia Bijaya Jeragan Abdul Syukor by virtue of his first wife. Toh Muda Abdul Aziz, his father, and Haji Mahmud Taib, his grandfather, were both titled Dato' Panglima Bukit Gantang. Of his fourteen brothers and sisters, Abdul Wahab is the second child. He had lived in Ipoh with his grandfather since he was a young boy.

Abdul Wahab received his early education at the Pekan Baru Malay School in Ipoh from 1912 to 1913. He continued his education at SMK Anderson from 1915 to 1925. He studied English language and literature and completed his Cambridge IGCSE in May 1925. He opted to pursue law while studying abroad at the University of London's Inner Temple, where he was very involved in student societies from 1925 to 1930. He was called to the bar in 1930, becoming the first Malay lawyer in the United Kingdom.

From 1927 to 1929, Abdul Wahab served as the Malay Students' Association (England) Honorary Secretary, and becoming their President in 1930. He was granted access to hear whole trials in English courts. He later passed University of London's bar examination and returned to Federated Malay States (FMS). Tunku Abdul Rahman, Raja Bot bin Raja Jumaat from Selangor, Nik Ahmad Kamil from Kelantan, Abdul Hamid Mustafa, and Syed Sheh Barakbah from Kedah were among his peers who studied in London. The Persatuan Drebar-drebar Melayu Perak (PDMPK) was founded by him in 1930.

== Career ==
After returning to British Malaya in 1931, Abdul Wahab started working for the government as a chamber officer in the Malaysian High Court for six months in the FMS. From 1931 to 1947, he was a practitioner in Ipoh. Tunku Abdul Rahman, reportedly referred to him as "one of the powerful Malay leaders of the day." In 1932, he went on to start a private law practice in Ipoh with attorney J. Dunford Wood, and he became a guaman (assistant officer in charge of scheduling court cases).

In 1936, Sultan Iskandar of Perak bestowed Abdul Wahab the title Orang Kaya Kaya Panglima Bukit Gantang Seri Amar Diraja (Panglima Bukit Gantang), one of the eight important chiefs of Perak, succeeding his grandpa. Due to his advanced education, he was also nominated as one of the Perak State Council, Ahli Dewan Undangan Negeri (ADUN) Perak, from 1937 and 1941. In addition, he led the Persatuan Melayu Perak from 1939 to 1940. From 1942 to 1945, during the Japanese occupation of Malaya, he presided as a judge. On 27 January 1946, the nationalist Perikatan Melayu Perak (The Perak Malay League) was established in the state of Perak. Abdul Wahab and other members of the traditional-bureaucratic elite dominated the organisation, eventually becoming its president from 1946 to 1947.

In order to settle disputes between Malay groups and discuss their future, Pergerakan Melayu Semenanjung Johor President Dato Onn Jaafar suggested calling a congress of Malays on 24 January 1946. Melaka was proposed as the venue for the Malay convention by Abdul Wahab of Perak, Dr. Hamzah Abdullah and Dato Onn of Johor. The event was then moved to The Sultan Sulaiman Club in Kuala Lumpur, under the guidance of the Pergerakan Melayu Semenanjung Melaka. This Malay congress was arranged by Zaaba, who is also connected to the Persatuan Melayu Selangor, and Mohd. Yunus Hamidi, the Editor of the Majlis.

Along with Dato Onn Jaafar, he was also a key player in the attempt to create the UMNO political party. After the inaugural Assembly was held in Johor Bahru in May 1946, Dato Onn was chosen to be the UMNO's founder president and given the responsibility of setting up an executive committee. Abdul Wahab became the first UMNO Secretary General from 1946 to 1947, and he led move of the organisation's headquarters to Ipoh, Perak. Perak served as the administrative hub of UMNO until 1949, when Malays all over the Peninsula began to embrace the organisation. He later held other Executive positions, such as Secretary of Legal Affairs. He also led the demonstration against the Malayan Union.

On 1 February 1948, he was appointed as Menteri Besar of Perak (MB), becoming the state's chief civil servant. During his tenure at the Kuala Kangsar district office in the mid-1950s, he observed an order he sent out to all district offices, instructing them to steer clear of institutions of worship while purchasing land for public use. He led UMNO Perak until his removal in 1953, following Dato Onn's departure from UMNO in 1951. He then founded the short-lived non-communal National Association of Perak, which was connected to Dato Onn's Parti Negara. He participated in the 1956 London Merdeka negotiations as a member of the Malayan delegation. He spent long nights going over all the memos and the draft constitution with Tunku Abdul Rahman and Tan Tong Hye of the Malaysian Chinese Association (MCA) in his capacity as the sultan of Perak's envoy.

In 1957, Omar Ali Saifuddien III, the Sultan of Brunei, dispatched a mission to London to discuss the constitution with the British Government, with final negotiations moved from 27 September to 30 September. The main focus of the 1957 London negotiations was the Rang Undang-Undang Perlembagaan Negeri Brunei, 'Brunei State Constitution Bill', written by Abdul Wahab in Brunei House, Singapore.

== Retirement and death ==
Abdul Wahab retained the MB position until the independence of Malaysia on 31 July 1957, which took effect on 1 August 1957. The population was shocked to learn of his death on 16 April 1959, at the age of 54. He died at his home in Canning Garden, Ipoh. To honour him, a reference was conducted in the Supreme Court in Ipoh the next day. He left behind three wives and two daughters at the time of his death.

== Namesakes ==
- Jalan Panglima Bukit Gantang Wahab is a major route that runs across the western part of Ipoh, Perak. It links Jalan Kuala Kangsar in the south with Bulatan Bahagia.
- Sekolah Menengah Kebangsaan (SMK) Panglima Bukit Gantang is a middle school in Parit Buntar.

== Honours ==
- Malaya
  - Commander of the Order of the Defender of the Realm (PMN) – Tan Sri (1958)
- Perak
  - Knight Grand Commander of the Order of Cura Si Manja Kini (SPCM) – Dato' Seri (2015–posthumously)

Political offices
Preceded by Position established	Menteri Besar of Perak; 1948–1957	Succeeded by Mohamed Ghazali Jawi
