= Setapak (Selangor federal constituency) =

Selangor constituency

Defunct federal constituency
- Legislature: Dewan Rakyat
- Constituency created: 1958
- Constituency abolished: 1974
- First contested: 1959
- Last contested: 1969

Setapak was a federal constituency in Selangor, Malaysia, that was represented in the Dewan Rakyat from 1959 to 1974.

The federal constituency was created in the 1958 redistribution and was mandated to return a single member to the Dewan Rakyat under the first past the post voting system.

== History ==
=== Representation history ===
Members of Parliament for Setapak
Parliament	No	Years	Member	Party	Vote Share
Constituency created from Kuala Lumpur Timor in the state of Selangor
Parliament of the Federation of Malaya
1st	P070	1959-1963	Ahmad Boestamam (احمد بوايستمم)	SF (Ra'ayat)	6,901; 44.35%
Parliament of Malaysia
1st	P070	1963-1964	Ahmad Boestamam (احمد بوايستمم)	SF (Ra'ayat)	6,901; 44.35%
2nd	P070	1964-1969	Chan Seong Yoon (詹祥云)	Alliance (MCA)	12,292; 50.39%
		1969-1971	Parliament was suspended		
3rd	P070	1971-1972	Walter Loh Poh Khan (罗保根)	DAP	17,137; 55.27%
3rd	P070	1972-1973	Walter Loh Poh Khan (罗保根)	Alliance (MCA)	17,137; 55.27%
3rd	P070	1973-1974	Walter Loh Poh Khan (罗保根)	BN (MCA)	17,137; 55.27%
Constituency abolished, split into Setapak and Selayang

=== State constituency ===
Parliamentary constituency	State constituency						
Parliamentary constituency	1955–59*	1959–1974	1974–1986	1986–1995	1995–2004	2004–2018	2018–present
Setapak		Ampang					
Setapak		Sentul					

=== Historical boundaries ===
State Constituency	State constituency
State Constituency	1959
Ampang	Ampang; Datuk Keramat; Gombak; Hulu Kelang; Lembah Jaya
Sentul	Kampung Puah; Padang Balang; Sentul; Setapak; Taman Melawati

== Election results ==
Malaysian general election, 1969
Party	Candidate	Votes	%	∆%
DAP	Walter Loh Poh Khan	17,137	55.27	▲55.27
Alliance	Teh Hock Heng	13,871	44.73	▼5.66
Total valid votes		31,008	100.00	
Total rejected ballots		2,165		
Unreturned ballots		0		
Turnout		33,173	57.23	▼10.99
Registered electors		57,969		
Majority		3,266	10.54	▼7.51
DAP gain from Alliance		Swing		?

Malaysian general election, 1964
Party	Candidate	Votes	%	∆%
Alliance	Chan Seong Yoon	12,292	50.39	▲19.51
Socialist Front	Tajuddin Abdul Kahar	7,888	32.34	▼12.01
PAP	K. V. Thaver	4,214	17.27	▲17.27
Total valid votes		24,394	100.00	
Total rejected ballots		871		
Unreturned ballots		0		
Turnout		25,265	68.22	▼1.72
Registered electors		37,034		
Majority		4,404	18.05	▲4.58
Alliance gain from Socialist Front		Swing		?

Malayan general election, 1959
Party	Candidate	Votes	%
Socialist Front	Ahmad Boestamam	6,901	44.35
Alliance	Aishah Ghani	4,805	30.88
Independent	Yap Kim Swee	3,853	24.76
Total valid votes		15,559	100.00
Total rejected ballots		102	
Unreturned ballots		0	
Turnout		15,661	69.64
Registered electors		22,490	
Majority		2,096	13.47
This was a new constituency created.
