= Sayong =

Village in Perak, Malaysia

Coordinates: 4.773°N 100.956°E

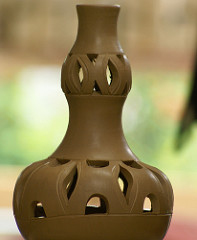
Jar made for storing water made in the style of Labu Sayong.

Sayong is a small village in Perak, Malaysia. It is famous for a traditional craft known as Labu Sayong, earthenware, gourd-shaped jars for keeping drinking water cool.

== Notable people ==
- Panglima Bukit Gantang (1905–1959), Malaysian politician and barrister
