= Malaysian Social Justice Party =

Malaysian Social Justice Party Parti Keadilan Masyarakat Malaysia PEKEMAS
- Abbreviation: PEKEMAS
- Founder: Veerappen Veerathan; Tan Chee Khoon; Syed Hussein Alatas
- Founded: 1972
- Dissolved: 1982
- Split from: Parti Gerakan Rakyat Malaysia
- Preceded by: Parti Marhaen Malaysia
- Headquarters: Kuala Lumpur, Malaysia
- Ideology: Socialism
- Political position: Left-wing
- Colours: Red, White, and Green

Malaysian Social Justice Party or (Malay: Parti Keadilan Masyarakat Malaysia) (PEKEMAS) was a political party formed by Veerappen Veerathan, Tan Chee Khoon and Syed Hussein Alatas in 1972. On 19 July 1974, Parti Marhaen Malaysia merged with the party. The party was dissolved in 1982.

== History ==
The party was formed by Tan Chee Khoon, Syed Hussein Alatas and Veerappen Veerathan in 1972 after Parti Gerakan Rakyat Malaysia co-founder Lim Chong Eu led Gerakan into the newly expanded Alliance (renamed as the Barisan Nasional or National Front). Tan strongly opposed this move because he felt it endorsed the race-based parties in Barisan Nasional. PEKEMAS was a non-communal party and formed based on principles similar to the original Gerakan. They were joined by another Gerakan MP V. David.

Despite this, Tan supported the controversial government-supported New Economic Policy, which expanded the privileges given to Bumiputra (Malays and other indigenous people) under Article 153 of the Constitution because he felt tougher affirmative action was required to address Malay poverty. On 19 July 1974, the smaller Parti Marhaen Malaysia, which was led by former Socialist Front leader Ahmad Boestamam, merged into the party. This boosted the party’s support among urban Malays.

In the 1974 general election, PEKEMAS suffered a terrible defeat, with Tan being the only successful candidate out of 36 candidates for Parliament, while Ong Yi How was the only winner in state polls, winning in Bagan Jermal.

PEKEMAS' campaign against the government was predicated on denying them the requisite 2/3 majority for amending the Constitution, which Tan opposed. The Democratic Action Party and the Sarawak National Party became the largest opposition parties in Parliament, with nine seats each. This effectively hamstrung Tan's and PEKEMAS' agenda in Parliament. Tan announced his retirement from politics in 1977, although he held his Parliamentary seat until his term expired the next year.

The party’s demise was also hastened by the defection of its chairman Ahmad Boestamam back to the Parti Rakyat Malaysia after 1978 general elections. The party further shrank in 1979 due to most of PEKEMAS' supporters defecting to the DAP. It managed to field a candidate in the 1982 general elections before its dissolution.

== List of PEKEMAS leaders ==
#	Name	Took office	Left office
1	Tan Chee Khoon	1972	1977
2	Ahmad Boestamam	1977	1978

== Elected Representatives ==
- Members of the Dewan Rakyat, 4th Malaysian Parliament
- List of Malaysian State Assembly Representatives (1974–78)

== General elections result ==
Election	Total seats won	Seats contested	Total votes	Share of votes	Outcome of election	Election leader
1974	1 / 154	36	105,718	4.99%	▲1 seats; Opposition	Tan Chee Khoon
1978	0 / 154	33	23,792	0.68%	▼1 seats; No representation in Parliament	Ahmad Boestamam
1982	0 / 154	33	619	0.01%	; No representation in Parliament	Shaharuddin Dahlan

== State election results ==
State election	State Legislative Assembly								
State election	Penang State Legislative Assembly	Perak State Legislative Assembly	Pahang State Legislative Assembly	Selangor State Legislative Assembly	Negeri Sembilan State Legislative Assembly	Malacca State Legislative Assembly	Johor State Legislative Assembly	Sabah State Legislative Assembly	Total won / Total contested
1974	1 / 27	0 / 42	0 / 32	0 / 33	0 / 24	0 / 20	0 / 32		1 / 94
1976								0 / 48	0 / 11
1978				0 / 33					0 / 11
1982		0 / 42							0 / 1

== See also ==
- Category:Malaysian Social Justice Party politicians
- Politics of Malaysia
- List of political parties in Malaysia
- People's Justice Party
