= Ahmad Boestamam =

Malaysian politician

Yang Berbahagia Dato' Ahmad Boestamam PNBS
- احمد بوستمم
- Boestamam In 1959

Member of the Malaysian Parliament for Setapak
- In office 19 August 1959 – 1 March 1964
- Preceded by: Constituency established
- Succeeded by: Chan Seong Yoon (Alliance)
- Majority: 2,096 (1959)

President of Parti Rakyat Malaysia
- In office 11 November 1955 – 20 July 1968
- Preceded by: Position established
- Succeeded by: Kassim Ahmad

President of Parti Marhaen Malaysia
- In office 20 July 1968 – 19 July 1974
- Preceded by: Position established
- Succeeded by: Position abolished

Chairmen of Malaysian Social Justice Party
- In office 1977–1978
- Preceded by: Tan Chee Khoon
- Succeeded by: Position abolished

Faction represented in Dewan Rakyat
- 1959–1964: Parti Rakyat Malaysia
- 1959–1964: Malayan Peoples' Socialist Front

Personal details
- Born: Abdullah Thani bin Raja Kechil; 30 November 1920 Setapak, Kuala Lumpur, Selangor, Federated Malay States, British Malaya
- Died: 19 January 1983 (aged 62) Jalan Pahang, Kuala Lumpur, Malaysia
- Party: Parti Rakyat Malaysia (PRM) (1955-1968, 1978-1983); Parti Marhaen Malaysia (PMM) (1968-1974); Malaysian Social Justice Party (PEKEMAS) (1974-1978)
- Other political affiliations: Malayan Peoples' Socialist Front (SF) (1959–1964)
- Spouse(s): Rohani Zainal Abidin, Shamsiah Fakeh (disputed claim)
- Children: 2, including Rustam Sani
- Education: Anderson School Ipoh
- Occupation: Politician, editor, reporter, writer

Abdullah Thani bin Raja Kechi (30 November 1920 – 19 January 1983), commonly known as Ahmad Boestamam, was a Malaysian freedom fighter and politician. He was the founding president of Parti Rakyat Malaysia and Parti Marhaen Malaysia and former chairman of the Malaysian Social Justice Party. He was an editor and reporter for several newspapers and took a pen-name honouring Indian freedom fighter Subhas Chandra Bose. He was elected a member of parliament for Setapak in Malaysia' first post-independence elections in 1959, and served lengthy spells as a political prisoner.

== Early life ==
Ahmad Boestamam was born in Setapak, Ampang, Kuala Lumpur (then part of Selangor) to ethnic Malay parents of Minangkabau origin who originally came from Tanah Datar, West Sumatra. He was raised in Tanjung Malim, Perak.

Boestamam had been a young follower of the Kesatuan Melayu Muda (KMM) from the late 1930s in Perak, emerging after the war as the militant youth leader of Angkatan Pemuda Insaf (API) to the older and more moderate Burhanuddin al-Helmy and Ishak Haji Muhammad of the Malay Nationalist Party (PKMM).

PKMM, in turn, led Pusat Tenaga Rakyat or Putera to join the All Malayan Council of Joint Action (AMCJA), which was then led by the Malayan Democratic Union (MDU), which was involved in drafting an alternative constitution to the document that eventually formed the basis of the Federation of Malaya.

Boestamam was detained without trial for seven years in early 1948, before the Malayan Emergency was declared in mid-1948, together with thousands of other pro-independence Malays. This pre-emptive repression by the colonial power was to ethnically colour the subsequent anti-colonial resistance.

== Election as MP ==
Soon after his release in 1955, he set up the Partai Rakyat Malaya with other independent fighters on 11 November 1955. Inspired by the anti-colonial and socialist struggle in Indonesia led by Sukarno, the party in its formative years subscribed to a pan-Malay/Indonesian nationalism. Unlike its contemporary UMNO (which ruled the country uninterrupted from independence until 2018), Parti Rakyat demanded total independence from British colonialism.

The party later joined with the Labour Party of Malaya, chaired by Ishak Haji Muhammad, to create the Socialist Front, which had great success in local council elections in Malaya, particularly in Penang and Malacca. The growing power of the left resulted in a heavy crackdown by the UMNO government.

In the 1959 elections he contested and won the Setepak parliamentary seat. In a three-way contest, he defeated Aishah Ghani of UMNO/Alliance and independent Yap Kim Swee, winning the seat by a margin of 2,096 votes.

In 1963, soon after the outbreak of the Konfrontasi between Malaysia and Indonesia, the Alliance government began massive round-ups of left-wing politicians and activists among the opposition.

He managed to contest the Langat seat in Selangor in the 1964 elections but lost heavily to Umno's Zakaria Mohd Taib.

He was among those arrested and detained in the mid 1960s, alongside Ishak Haji Muhammad, Abdul Aziz Ishak, Kampo Radjo, V. David, Tan Kai Hee, Tan Hock Hin, M.K. Rajakumar, Karam Singh Veeriah, Hasnul Hadi, Tajuddin Kahar and hundreds of others.

The Socialist Front eventually dissolved under strong state repression and local council elections were abolished.

Parti Rakyat became a fringe party in parliamentary politics and following his release from detention, Boestamam was removed as party leader by a group led by Kassim Ahmad.

He and Ishak Haji Muhammad established Parti Marhaen Malaysia in 1968 and attempted to re-establish the Socialist Front before the 1974 elections, but failed.

He then merged Parti Marhaen into Pekemas but that party also floundered, winning only one seat in the 1974 elections. He took over the Pekemas party presidency from Tan Chee Khoon but left soon after.

== Legacy ==
Boestamam's son, Rustam Sani would later become the deputy president of the party his father founded.

Ahmad Boestaman died on 19 January 1983.

== Election results ==
Parliament of the Federation of Malaya
Year	Constituency	Candidate	Votes	Pct	Opponent(s)	Votes	Pct	Ballots cast	Majority	Turnout
1959	P070 Setapak	Ahmad Boestamam (PRM)	6,901	30.68%	Aishah Ghani (UMNO)	4,805	21.37%	15,743	2,096	70.00%
1959	P070 Setapak	Ahmad Boestamam (PRM)	6,901	30.68%	Yao Kim Swee (IND)	3,853	24.47%	15,743	2,096	70.00%

Parliament of Malaysia
Year	Constituency	Candidate	Votes	Pct	Opponent(s)	Votes	Pct	Ballots cast	Majority	Turnout
1964	P069 Langat	Ahmad Boestamam (PRM)	4,260	29.31%	Zakaria Mohd Taib (UMNO)	10,275	70.69%	14,535	6,015	80.31%
1974	P061 Hilir Perak	Ahmad Boestamam (PEKEMAS)	4,925	27.36%	Abu Bakar Arshad (UMNO)	13,077	72.64%	19,319	8,152	71.10%

== Honours ==
- Sarawak
  - Knight Commander of the Most Exalted Order of the Star of Sarawak (PNBS) – Dato' (1976)

=== Namesakes ===
A school in Sitiawan, Perak was named after him.

- Ahmad Boestamam National Secondary School
