= Rustam Sani =

Malaysian politician, sociologist and political scientist

- Born: Rustam bin Abdullah Sani; 11 August 1944; Tanjung Malim, Perak
- Died: 23 April 2008 (aged 63); Gombak District, Selangor
- Father: Ahmad Boestaman

Rustam Abdullah Sani (11 August 1944 – 23 April 2008) was a Malaysian politician, sociologist and political scientist. He was of Minangkabau descent from Salido, West Sumatera.

Born towards the end of the Japanese occupation of Malaya in the Perak border town of Tanjung Malim, Rustam grew up in the shadow of his famous father, Abdullah Sani, who was better known as Ahmad Boestaman. Boestaman was a Malay nationalist and the founder of the left-wing political movement Angkatan Pemuda Insaf and the socialist party Parti Rakyat Malaysia. He married a woman named Rohani Rustam, with whom he had a son and a daughter, Azrani Rustam and Ariani Rustam.

Rustam served as an associate professor at Universiti Kebangsaan Malaysia, Universiti Malaya and was a prolific writer in Malay and English. His anthology of poems, Riak-Riak Kecil, composed in 1977, was published by Dewan Bahasa dan Pustaka. Rustam won the National Literature Award for 1988/89.

== Education ==
Rustam attended the Victoria Institution in Kuala Lumpur. He later enrolled at the University of Malaya for a bachelor's degree before heading to the University of Kent for a master's degree, where he wrote a thesis entitled Social Roots of the Malay Left which traced the origin of the Malay political left to the 1920s. At Kent, he mentored a variety of undergraduates including PAS secretary-general Kamaruddin Jaffar, economist Ghazali Atan and publisher Lim Siang Jin.

== Early career ==
Rustam joined the Universiti Kebangsaan Malaysia economics faculty in early 1977, then still at its temporary campus in Lembah Pantai, Kuala Lumpur. It was here he befriended with many personalities such as Jomo Kwame Sundaram, Sanusi Osman, Ting Chew Peh and Shamsul Amri Baharuddin. He deepened his preoccupation with the challenges of Malaysian nationhood at the university, an enduring theme in his writings since the 1970s, and the subject of one of his two latest books, which was launched posthumously by his old friend from the 1960s, Anwar Ibrahim.

Later he embarked for Yale University, but after passing the tough comprehensive exams there, he lost interest, preferring instead to write a statistics textbook. Back at UKM, he switched to the Politics Department as his old Canterbury friend, then Abim secretary-general Kamaruddin, had left to join Anwar in the United Malays National Organisation (UMNO) and the Government.

With Syed Husin serving as the president of Malaysian Social Science Association (PSSM), Rustam started a bilingual quarterly journal, Ilmu Masyarakat, to encourage ongoing issues in Malaysia during the tenure of the then new Prime Minister Mahathir Mohamad. Among the early contributors was Khalid Ibrahim who was a former Universiti Kebangsaan Malaysia (UKM) academic later chief executive of Permodalan Nasional Berhad (PNB) and Guthrie, who subsequently served as Menteri Besar of Selangor.

At the end of the 1980s, Rustam accepted Nordin Sopiee's invitation to join ISIS. There, he helped to craft Mahathir's historic February 1991 speech promising a “Bangsa Malaysia” as part of his Vision 2020 (thankfully translated by Rustam as Wawasan 2020, instead of the earlier Visi 2020), changing the terms of national discourse in one fell swoop.

Frustrated by its lack of serious commitment, he left ISIS in the mid-1990s to become a writer, translator and reluctant businessman.

Soon after, he agreed to become deputy president of PSSM, later inaugurating the biennial series of international Malaysian Studies Conferences in which we tried to reposition Malaysian studies as a national – and nationalist – discourse, rather than as post-colonial studies.

== Political involvement ==
However, the events of 1997–99 with the sacking of the then Deputy Prime Minister Anwar Ibrahim disrupted Rustam's plans and he rose to the popular national call for Reformasi following Anwar's incarceration and persecution, becoming a thoughtful “participant observer”.

As deputy president of the Parti Rakyat Malaysia, a party his father had founded almost half a century before, he negotiated its principled unification with the political movement which had emerged around Anwar despite several high-profile defections. After the merger with Parti Keadilan Nasional to become the Parti Keadilan Rakyat (PKR), he became PKR information chief.

== Death ==
Rustam died at his home in Gombak, Selangor on 23 April 2008 at the age of 64 due to respiratory difficulties. His body was sent to a mosque near his house at Bukit Lela and he was later buried at the Taman Danau Kota Muslim cemetery after Zohor prayers.
