= Aishah Ghani =

Malaysian politician

Yang Berbahagia Tan Sri Datin Paduka Seri Hajah Aishah Ghani PMN SPMS DPMS JMN PPM ADK
- عائشة غاني

Minister of Social Welfare
- In office 11 October 1983 – 14 July 1984
- Monarchs: Ahmad Shah; Iskandar
- Prime Minister: Mahathir Mohamad
- Preceded by: Herself (as Minister of General Welfare)
- Succeeded by: Abu Hassan Omar

Minister of General Welfare
- In office 1 March 1973 – 10 October 1983
- Monarchs: Abdul Halim; Yahya Petra; Ahmad Shah
- Prime Minister: Abdul Razak Hussein; Hussein Onn; Mahathir Mohamad
- Preceded by: Fatimah Hashim
- Succeeded by: Herself (as Minister of Social Welfare)

Member of the Malaysian Parliament for Kuala Langat
- In office 1974–1986
- Preceded by: Mohd Tahir Abdul Majid
- Succeeded by: Basri Bajuri

Personal details
- Born: 15 December 1923 Hulu Langat, Selangor, Federated Malay States, British Malaya (now Malaysia)
- Died: 19 April 2013 (aged 89) Kuala Lumpur, Malaysia
- Resting place: Bukit Kiara Muslim Cemetery, Kuala Lumpur
- Party: United Malays National Organisation (UMNO)
- Other political affiliations: Barisan Nasional (BN)
- Spouse: Abdul Aziz Abu Hassan

Aishah binti Ghani (Jawi: عائشة بنت غاني; 15 December 1923 – 19 April 2013) was a Malaysian politician who served as Minister of Social Welfare from 1973 to 1984 and Head of Wanita UMNO women's Malaysia from 1972 to 1984.

== Early life and education ==
Born in Kampung Sungai Serai, Hulu Langat, Selangor, Aishah was a Minangkabau descent from Sijunjung, West Sumatra. She acquired education early in Bukit Raya Malay School, Cheras, Selangor. Ghani attended secondary school at the Diniyah Putri school in Padang Panjang, West Sumatra, Indonesia, from 1936 to 1939. The school had been founded by Rahmah el Yunusiyah in 1923. In the year 1940 until 1943, she joined the College of Islamic Universities in Padang, West Sumatra, and then went to London in April 1955 and graduated journalism from Regent Street Polytechnic in London in December 1958.

== Political career ==
Aishah's involvement in politics began as soon as the Malay Nationalist Party (PKMM) was founded in 1945, and she became a member of the women's wing and thus led the so-called Conscious Women's Front (AWAS).

At that time, she also worked as a journalist Pelita Malaya, PKMM official tongue. Aisha out of AWAS in 1946 (AWAS then banned by the government in 1948) and joined the rally which demanded independence at the Sultan Sulaiman Club, Kuala Lumpur, in March the same year. She joined Umno New Village in 1949 and was appointed as secretary.

Aishah on her return from her studies in London in 1959, worked as a journalist again, this time for the Berita Harian, as well as the editor in Group Releases New Straits Times. She put both her office in 1963 when she became a member of the UMNO Supreme Council and vice-chairman of Wanita Umno. On 13 September 1962, she was appointed the Senator and assented to the Yang di-Pertuan Agong.

She was the first woman in Malaysia to be a senator and was Malaysia's first woman representative to the General Assembly of the United Nations (UN). From 1967 to 1972, Aisha was Malaysia's representative to the United Nations Conference on the Status of Women Commission. She also served as Secretary of State for Wanita Umno Selangor between 1960 and 1972.

In 1972, Aishah was appointed the Chief of UMNO Wanita Malaysia, an organisation which she headed for 12 years until 1984. On 1 March 1973, she was appointed as Minister of Social Welfare after the retirement of Fatimah Hashim and held this position for 11 years before ending her service in 1984. During her tenure as Minister of General Welfare, she launched the Yayasan Kebajikan Negara (National Welfare Foundation) (YKN), an organisation that is still functioning today. Aishah was Permanent Chairman of UMNO Wanita Malaysia from 1986 until 2013.

== Career after politics ==
After her political career, Aishah became as a chairman of the Malaysian Handicraft Development Corporation (Kraftangan Malaysia) from 1985 until 1997. She was a member of the Tun Abdul Razak Foundation, and Chairman of the Centre for Protection of Women Darsaadah. Also, she was Chairman of the Koperasi Wanita Jaya Murni Berhad since its inception in 1975. Aishah also devoted her time in the field of business, and was the chairman and / or director for at least seven private limited companies.

== Death ==
Aishah died on 19 April 2013 at the age of 90. She was buried at Bukit Kiara Muslim Cemetery, Kuala Lumpur.

== Election results ==
Parliament of the Federation of Malaya
Year	Constituency	Candidate	Votes	Pct	Opponent(s)	Votes	Pct	Ballots cast	Majority	Turnout
1959	P070 Setapak	Aishah Ghani (UMNO)	4,805	21.37%	Ahmad Boestamam (PRM)	6,901	30.68%	15,743	2,096	70.00%
1959	P070 Setapak	Aishah Ghani (UMNO)	4,805	21.37%	Yao Kim Swee (IND)	3,853	24.47%	15,743	2,096	70.00%

Parliament of Malaysia
Year	Constituency	Candidate	Votes	Pct	Opponent(s)	Votes	Pct	Ballots cast	Majority	Turnout
1974	P082 Kuala Langat	Aishah Ghani (UMNO)	Unopposed							
1978	P082 Kuala Langat	Aishah Ghani (UMNO)	14,405	66.66%	Hassan Ishak (PAS)	7,205	33.34%	22,728	7,200	77.63%
1982	P082 Kuala Langat	Aishah Ghani (UMNO)	20,866	77.29%	Mohsinon Tahir (PAS)	6,131	22.71%	28,319	14,735	78.18%

== Honours ==
=== Honours of Malaysia ===
- Malaysia
  - Commander of the Order of the Defender of the Realm (PMN) – Tan Sri (1985)
  - Companion of the Order of the Defender of the Realm (JMN) (1966)
  - Recipient of the Malaysian Commemorative Medal (Silver) (PPM) (1965)
- Sabah
  - Member of the Order of Kinabalu (ADK) (1971)
- Selangor
  - Knight Grand Commander of the Order of the Crown of Selangor (SPMS) – Datin Paduka Seri (1999)
  - Knight Commander of the Order of the Crown of Selangor (DPMS) – Datin Paduka (1977)

== Awards and recognitions ==
=== Honours ===
- 1966 : Johan Mangku Negara (J.M.N.) by His Majesty the Yang di-Pertuan Agong
- 1977 : Dato' Paduka Mahkota Selangor Second Class (DPMS) which carries the title 'Datin Paduka' by the Sultan of Selangor
- 1985 : Panglima Mangku Negara (P.M.N.) which carries the title Tan Sri by His Majesty the Yang di-Pertuan Agong
- 1986 : Honorary Doctorate of Law by Universiti Sains Malaysia (USM)
- 1999 : Seri Paduka Mahkota Selangor First Class (SPMS) which carries the title 'Datin Paduka Seri' by the Sultan of Selangor
- 2002 : Honorary Doctorate in Political Science by the National University of Malaysia (UKM).

=== Places named after her ===
Several places were named after her, including:

- Kolej Tan Sri Aishah Ghani, a residential college at Universiti Malaysia Perlis, Bintong, Perlis
- Kolej Tan Sri Aishah Ghani, a residential college at Universiti Putra Malaysia, Serdang, Selangor
