= Parti Marhaen Malaysia =

- Abbreviation: PMM
- Founder: Ahmad Boestamam
- Founded: 20 July 1968
- Dissolved: 1974
- Split from: Parti Rakyat
- Merged into: Parti Keadilan Masyarakat Malaysia (PEKEMAS)
- Headquarters: Kuala Lumpur, Malaysia
- Ideology: Marhaenism
- Political position: Left-wing
- Colours: Red
- Slogan: Sosio-nasional-demokrasi (Socio-national democracy)

Parti Marhaen Malaysia (PMM) was a short-lived left-wing party formed by former Parti Rakyat Malaysia president Ahmad Boestamam. It formed as a splinter party of PRM in 1968 and merged into another left-wing party Pekemas in 1974.

== History ==
The party was formed by Ahmad Boestamam on 20 July 1968, 8 hours before he left Malaysia for London to pursue legal studies for two and a half years.

It was formed due to disputes between Ahmad Boestamam, the first president of Partai Rakyat, and his successor, Kassim Ahmad, regarding the Marhaenism ideology which was abandoned by the party leadership in favour of scientific socialism.

The party was initially led by the triumvirate of Ishak Surin, Shariff Babol (former founder of Partai Rakyat) and Sheikh Hassan Jaafar.

Parti Marhein merged with Parti Keadilan Masyarakat Malaysia (PEKEMAS) on 19 July 1974.

== List of party leaders ==
#	Name	Took office	Left office
1	Ahmad Boestamam	1968	1974

== Aftermath ==
The party tried to reinvigorate the Socialist Front coalition before the 1974 elections, but failed.

== See also ==
- Politics of Malaysia
- List of political parties in Malaysia
- Parti Negara
