= Malay nationalism =

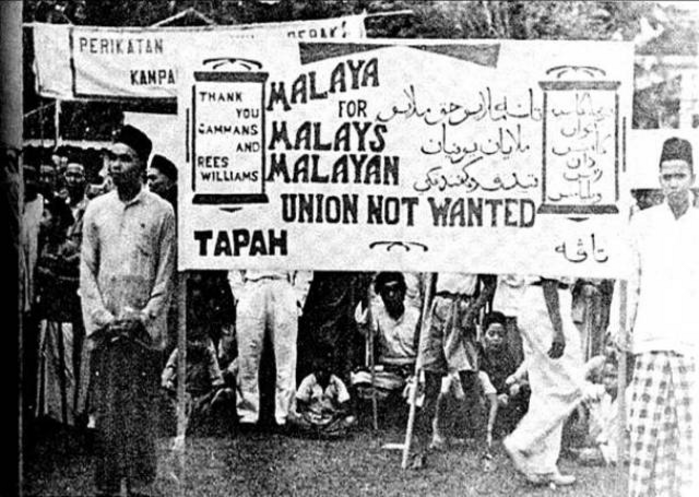
A protest against the Malayan Union

Malay nationalism (Malay: Semangat Kebangsaan Melayu, Jawi: سماڠت كبڠساءن ملايو) refers to the nationalism that focused overwhelmingly on the Malay anticolonial struggle, motivated by the nationalist ideal of creating a Bangsa Melayu ("Malay nation"). Its central objectives were the advancement and protection of Malayness: religion (Islam), language (Malay), and royalty (Malay rulers). Such pre-occupation is a direct response to the European colonial presence and the influx of a foreign migrant population in Malaya since the mid-nineteenth century.

Malay nationalism has its roots in the end of the 19th century, but did not exist as a united and organised political movement. The concept of ketuanan Melayu (Malay hegemony) was largely irrelevant at the time, as the Chinese and Indians, who formed almost half of the population, did not see themselves as citizens of Malaya. A report by the British Permanent Under-Secretary of State for the Colonies in the early 1930s found that "the number of non-Malays who have adopted Malaya as their home is only a very small proportion of the whole population".

The rise of Malay nationalism was largely caused by three nationalist factions: the radicals distinguishable into the Malay left and the Islamic group which were both opposed to the conservative elites. The Malay leftists were represented by Kesatuan Melayu Muda, formed in 1938 by a group of Malay intelligentsia primarily educated in Sultan Idris Training College, with an ideal of Greater Indonesia. In 1945, they reorganised themselves into a political party known as Partai Kebangsaan Melayu Malaya (PKMM). The Islamists were originally represented by Kaum Muda consisted of Middle Eastern–educated scholars (especially from Egypt) influenced by social reformist and Pan-Islamic thought. The first Islamic political party was Parti Orang Muslimin Malaya (Hizbul Muslimin) formed in March 1948, later succeeded by Pan-Malayan Islamic Party in 1951. The third group was the conservatives which consisted of the westernised elites who were bureaucrats and members of royal families that shared a common English education mostly at the exclusive Malay College Kuala Kangsar. They formed voluntary organisations known as Malay Associations in various parts of the country and their primary goals were to advance the interests of Malays as well as requesting British protection on Malay positions. In March 1946, 41 of these Malay associations formed the United Malays National Organisation (UMNO), to assert Malay dominance over Malaya.

The first major show of force by Malay nationalism came in 1946 when Britain proposed a Malayan Union that would greatly reduce the powers of Malay rulers and give citizenship to foreign immigrants. Under intense pressure from the United Malays National Organisation, the British withdrew the proposal, resulting in the formation of the Federation of Malaya in 1948.

== Early 20th century ==
Although Malaya was effectively governed by the British, the Malays held de jure sovereignty over Malaya. A former British High Commissioner, Hugh Clifford, urged "everyone in this country [to] be mindful of the fact that this is a Malay country, and we British came here at the invitation of Their Highnesses the Malay Rulers, and it is our duty to help the Malays to rule their own country." The British government adopted an open "Pro-Malay" policy so that, in the words of High Commissioner Sir Laurence Guillemard, the Malays could be equipped "to take their proper place in the administrative and commercial life of these States."

The local-born non-Malay communities soon began agitating against the government's policies, and began demanding political representation. In 1936, the Malayan-born Indian community asked the British High Commissioner, Sir Shenton Thomas, to grant them a share of administrative appointments. Thomas rejected the request, stating, "... I do not know of any country in which what I might call a foreigner ... has ever been appointed to an administrative post." Later, some commentators attributed this to Britain's ignorance of the increasing size of the local-born, non-Malay population. Between 1911 and 1921, 1.5 million Chinese migrated to Malaya to work as manual labourers; a million Chinese workers in Malaya emigrated back to China; and the proportion of Malayan-born Chinese in Malaya grew from 8% to 17%. The British nevertheless appeared to view the entire Chinese community as a "transient labour force", with one government official insisting it would be dangerous to consider the Chinese as having "a tendency to permanent settlement". The locally born Indian community, comprising 20% of the Indian population, was likewise largely ignored.

However, the British at the same time took the stance that the Malays were to be left alone to their traditional peasant lifestyle as far as possible, involving only the Malay ruling class in government and administrative issues. Despite the policy of excluding non-Malays from positions of authority, much of the rank and file of the civil service was non-Malays, many of them Indians who the government had specifically brought in for this purpose. A number of historians have described the pro-Malay policies of the British as designed merely to preserve the position of the British, rather than to strengthen that of the Malays; historians have noted that successive British colonial administrations intentionally separated Malaysian society into a place where "the towns were Chinese, with their shopkeepers and traders; the villages were Malay, with their farmers and fishermen; the plantations were Indian, with their rubber tappers and labourers," keeping "the races at just the right distance from each other to have the disparate elements of Malaya work in remote harmony."

In the 1920s, the local-born Chinese community began pushing for a greater role in Malayan government. The Chinese community by now made up 39% of the Malayan population. The dialect-speaking Chinese wanted to be given government positions and recognised as Malayans. One Straits Chinese leader asked, "Who said this is a Malay country? ... When Captain [Francis] Light arrived, did he find Malays, or Malay villages? Our forefathers came here and worked hard as coolies – weren't ashamed to become coolies – and they didn't send their money back to China. They married and spent their money here, and in this way the Government was able to open up the country from jungle to civilisation. We've become inseparable from this country. It's ours, our country ...". Some Malay intellectuals objected to this reasoning, and proposed an analogy with the Chinese as masons and Malaya as a house. They argued that a paid mason, was not entitled to a share in the ownership rights to a home he built. As such, they opposed any attempt to grant the Chinese citizenship or other political rights.

However, not all Malays were natives of Malaya. A number of other distinct ethnic groups related to the Malays, such as the Javanese and Bugis, migrated to Malaya from elsewhere in the region throughout the 19th and 20th centuries. Most of them were quickly assimilated into the Malay cultural identity. Eventually, the Chinese appeals appeared to affect the British. In 1927, the Governor of the Straits Settlements which comprised Penang, Malacca and Singapore, proclaimed that "The Chinese form today a majority of the indigenous inhabitants of British Malaya, and they are perhaps the most enterprising, energetic, provident and frugal of its sons."

In 1938, the leftist Kesatuan Melayu Muda (KMM) was formed by Ibrahim Yaacob and other activists in Kuala Lumpur, with its main goal ostensibly being the formation of Greater Indonesia. During this period, Malay nationalism began to focus on ketuanan Melayu, which in the past had been taken for granted. Some Malays began to worry that the British policies appeared geared towards the creation of a common Malayan nationality inclusive of the Chinese and Indians. Ironically, some of them thus sought to preserve the status quo with the British as a bulwark against the non-Malays, while others began agitating for an independent and sovereign Malay nation, such as Greater Indonesia. There is a dispute over what the KMM's goal actually was, with some former members alleging that the only interest of the KMM had been preserving the special position of the Malays, whatever the cost, and others claiming that there had been real plans to overthrow the British. Historians have been unable to verify either claim due to a lack of documentation from the period.

Shortly before the outbreak of World War II in Asia, the British detained several influential KMM leaders. However, most of them were freed during World War II, when the Japanese invaded and occupied Malaya. The former KMM leaders then formed the Kesatuan Rakyat Indonesia Semenanjung (KRIS) to carry on the KMM's work. However, the planned Greater Indonesia never materialised due to the sudden Japanese surrender after the bombing of Hiroshima and Nagasaki. With the return of the British, the KRIS leaders formed the Malay Nationalist Party (MNP; also known as the Persatuan Kebangsaan Melayu Malaya or PKMM) to achieve their goals through democratic means. However, the MNP was soon banned by the government as part of a crack-down on left-wing parties, ending the early phase of Malay nationalism.

== The Malayan Union ==
After World War II, the British announced the establishment of the Malayan Union, which would have loose immigration policies, reduce the sovereignty of the Malay rulers both in name and reality, and not recognise Malay sovereignty over Malaya. It would also establish Malaya as a protectorate of the United Kingdom. A large percentage of the Chinese and Indians – 83 and 75 percent, respectively – would qualify for citizenship under jus soli, which would grant citizenship to all locally born residents. With equal rights guaranteed to all, the Malays feared that what little power they had left would soon be taken away from them. Even their traditional stronghold, the civil service, would be open to all Malayans.

For what many commentators agree appears to be the first time, the Malays became politically conscious, organising rallies and marches to protest the Malayan Union's formation. At one such gathering, placards were hoisted, declaring that "Malaya Belongs to the Malays. We do not want the other races to be given the rights and privileges of the Malays." The Pan-Malayan Malay Congress of Malay leaders sent a telegram to the British government protesting the Malayan Union's formation, and elaborated on this by asserting that the citizenship provisions constituted a threat to the future of Malaya, eventually leading to "the wiping from existence of the Malay race along with their land and Rulers". A group of Malay royalists and civil servants formed the United Malays National Organisation (UMNO) to protest the Malayan Union's formation. Led by Dato' Onn Jaafar, UMNO organised a campaign and co-ordinated several previously divided Malay organisations against the Union's creation. Although the Union was established as planned, the campaign continued; in 1948, the British retired the Malayan Union in favour of the Federation of Malaya, whose constitution restored sovereignty to the Malay rulers, tightened immigration and citizenship restrictions, and gave the Malays special privileges. Nevertheless, the avowed goal of the British remained the same as it had been in 1946: to introduce "a form of common citizenship open to all those, irrespective of race, who regarded Malaya as their real home and as the object of their loyalty."

Opposition to ketuanan Melayu and UMNO during this period came from the All-Malaya Council of Joint Action (AMCJA) which initially opposed the Malayan Union because of its exclusion of Singapore, lack of universal suffrage, and restricted civil liberties. The AMCJA, which was an amalgamation of several smaller organisations and trade unions, claimed to be the only organisation sufficiently representative of Malaya to be able to negotiate with the British, and demanded a place at the bargaining table with the British for negotiations on the federation's formation. Later, the MNP (which had not been deregistered yet) and several other Malay organisations left the UMNO fold and formed the Pusat Tenaga Raayat (PUTERA). Although the MNP had insisted on ketuanan Melayu as a "National Birthright" of the Malays, PUTERA made a compromise with the AMCJA to work together towards, among other things, "Equal political rights for all who regarded Malaya as their real home and as the object of their loyalty." The original name of the AMCJA had used the phrase "All-Malayan", but this was altered after PUTERA objected, as the Malays perceived the term "Malayan" to specifically exclude the Malays. After the British refused to appoint a Malayan to head the Consultative Committee which would canvass the views of Malayans on the existing proposals for the federation, the PUTERA-AMCJA coalition pulled out of negotiations with the British. Nevertheless, they continued to influence Malayan politics right until the formation of the federation in 1948, when they launched a hartal (boycott) to protest perceived defects in the federation proposal. The hartal is estimated to have cost the Malayan economy £4 million. After the federation was formed over their objections, the coalition disbanded.

Prior to the formation of the federation, the non-Malays were generally uninvolved in Malayan politics and nationalism, which was essentially Malay in nature. During the tenure of the Malayan Union, there was never any major political backing from either the Chinese or Indians, both of which were more interested in the politics of their respective homelands. The AMCJA, although mostly non-Malay, did not represent a large section of the non-Malay communities in Malaya. As a result, some historians have pinpointed the failure of the Malayan Union as the incident that made the Chinese aware of the need for political representation in Malaya, attributing to it the formation of the Malayan Chinese Association (MCA) – a communal political party which advocated for the Chinese to have equal political rights as the Malays over Malaya, directly challenging the concept of ketuanan Melayu. Others, however, argue that the main driving force behind non-Malay involvement in Malayan politics, and their assertion of certain rights, was the increasing number of local-born non-Malays. The same report from the British Permanent Under-Secretary of State for the Colonies said that "Those who have been born in Malaya themselves, or whose children have been born there ... state that in a great many cases those concerned have never seen the land of their origin and they claim that their children and their children's children should have fair treatment." The inaugural President of the MCA was Tan Cheng Lock, a local-born Peranakan who had led the AMCJA until its breaking up.

== Towards independence ==
Having achieved their initial goals, UMNO's leaders decided to establish their organisation as a political party to fight for independence. At the same time, the Malayan Communist Party (MCP) decided to launch an armed insurgency against what they viewed as a British puppet state, culminating in the Malayan Emergency which would last until after independence. The insurgency was marked by a clear racial divide; the opposition to the insurrection was almost entirely Malay, while those seen fighting in the communist ranks were nearly always Chinese. This exacerbated racial tensions, leading the British to advise Onn Jaafar to work together with other Malayan community leaders for the benefit of Malayan politics. Eventually, after some informal meetings between Onn, Tan Cheng Lock, and E.E.C. Thuraisingham, the Communities Liaison Committee (CLC) was established. The CLC became a focal point for the top echelon of Malayan politicians over the next few years, hammering out proposals and compromises on a number of issues, including citizenship, education, democracy, and resolving the impasse on ketuanan Melayu. It was eventually decided that a "bargain" would be forged between the Malays and non-Malays; in return for giving up ketuanan Melayu (referred to as the Malays' special position), the Malays would receive assistance from the non-Malays in closing the economic gap between the impoverished and overwhelmingly rural Malays with the substantially better off and urban non-Malays. Thuraisingham later said, "It is true. I and others believed that the backward Malays should be given a better deal. Malays should be assisted to attain parity with non-Malays to forge a united Malayan Nation of equals."

Still, problems continued to crop up. When the Malayan government implemented a system of national service, whereby Malayan youths would be conscripted into the army to stave off communist attacks. Many Chinese refused to participate, fleeing to Hong Kong or mainland China via Singapore. Only 1,800 Chinese registered for the draft, many of them English-educated. The Chinese press opposed national service as well, with the Sin Chew Jit Poh arguing that skilled workers and teachers, as well as first-born sons, be exempted. The Nanyang Siang Pau insisted that the Chinese be granted citizenship before being called to defend Malaya against the communists, while the China Press stated its preference for a voluntary army. Tan Cheng Lock also spoke out in defence of the Chinese opposition, saying that the Chinese traditionally gave their loyalty to their family and locality instead of their nation, with the "Western" concept of social obligation all but unknown to the vast majority of Chinese. A similar system in Chinese-majority Singapore was implemented later that decade, with similar results. To the Malays, this indicated that the Chinese had no particular loyalty towards Malaya and justified ketuanan Melayu, heightening similar perceptions caused by the apparent racial dichotomy between those in fierce opposition to the communists and those supporting the MCP.

Later, the British government implemented the Briggs Plan, which moved Chinese villagers living near the jungles, who often voluntarily provided or were coerced into providing assistance and supplies to MCP guerillas, to "new villages". These new villages, which were equipped with amenities such as electricity and piped water, were surrounded with perimeter fencing and armed guards to prevent attacks from the communist soldiers. It was hoped that by providing the Chinese with such facilities, they would be converted from "reservoirs of resentment into bastions of loyal Malayan citizenry". However, critics argue that the homogenous nature of new villages – with the few multiracial ones eventually failing or turning into ghettoes – worked against this goal, instead accentuating communalist fervour and causing racial polarisation, especially in politics, as electoral constituencies would now be delineated more along racial lines. Previously, the Chinese had been spread out geographically, but the Briggs Plan would now bring together rural Chinese from all over the country and concentrate them in the new villages. There was significant resentment towards the programme both among the Chinese and Malays. The Chinese frequently suffered from collective punishment, preventive detention and summary deportation aimed at weeding out communist supporters, while the Malays were angry at the infrastructure provided for the new villages as their own settlements remained undeveloped.

In the early 1950s, Onn Jaafar begin to argue in favour of opening UMNO membership to all Malayans, and to rename it as the United Malayan National Organisation. However, he was defeated in an internal power struggle, and resigned in 1951 to found the Independence of Malaya Party (IMP). He was succeeded by Tunku Abdul Rahman (often known as "the Tunku").

Upon succeeding to the UMNO Presidency, the Tunku insisted that sovereignty over the Malaya be given to the Malays, and expressed concern over a lack of loyalty to Malaya among non-Malays, demanding that they clarify their allegiance before they were accorded citizenship. He went on to say that "For those who love and feel they owe undivided loyalty to this country, we will welcome them as Malayans. They must truly be Malayans, and they will have the same rights and privileges as the Malays." Not long after, in 1952, however, he appeared to contradict himself, and insisted that "Malaya is for the Malays and it should not be governed by a mixture of races." Malays, he argued, would have to safeguard their rights over Malaya, "which is ours, for the benefit of our future generation."

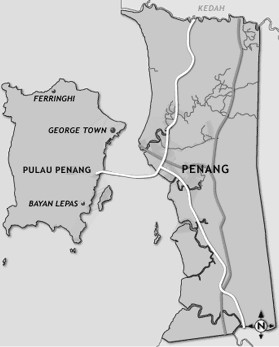
During the early 1950s, there was an active Straits Chinese secessionist movement in Penang agitating against ketuanan Melayu.

During this period, some Straits Chinese began taking an active interest in local politics, especially in Penang, where there was an active Chinese secessionist movement. They identified themselves more with the British than the Malays and were especially angered by references to them as pendatang asing ("aliens"). They avoided both UMNO and the MCA, believing that while UMNO and the Malay extremists were intent on extending Malay privileges and restricting Chinese rights, the MCA was too "selfish", and could not be relied on to protect their interests. They had already raised their ire in the late 1940s, when the government proposed to amend the Banishment Ordinance – which allowed for the exile of Malayans "implicated in acts of violence" – to permit those born in the Straits Settlements to be banished. This was a revolting idea for most of the Straits Chinese. They were also uncomfortable about the merger of the Straits Settlements with Malaya, as they did not feel a sense of belonging to what they considered a "Malaya for the Malays", where they were not considered bumiputra ("sons of the soil"). One Straits Chinese leader said, "I can claim to be more anak Pulau Pinang [a son of Penang] than 99 per cent of the Malays living here today." The secessionist movement eventually petered out, however, because of the government's stout refusal to entertain the idea of Penang seceding from the federation.

Another problem that the government was forced to confront was increasing tension on the subject of citizenship and nationality. The provisions of the federation's citizenship laws stated that citizenship "was not a nationality, neither could it develop into a nationality." As a result, critics postulated that non-Malay Malayans could not feel a sense of allegiance towards Malaya, or take interest in Malayan politics as opposed to those of their respective ancestral homelands. To counter this, in 1952 the government issued an ordinance that granted citizenship to almost 1.5 million non-Malays, and also prohibited dual citizenship, forcing the non-Malays to choose between their ancestral homeland and Malaya. After the passing of the ordinance, only 1.3 million Malayan residents out of 5.7 million were without Malayan citizenship, and the bulk of these, about 0.9 million had been born outside Malaya. Although praised by some as a "clear stimulus to the evolution of a Malayan people", others claimed the ordinance had not created a single Malayan nationality that all could relate to.

As Malaya began moving to self-government, the British initiated the Member System, through which various political leaders were appointed to posts in charge of certain "portfolios", modelled after the cabinet system. The Member System was later described as setting a precedent for the multiracial Malayan and Malaysian cabinets post-independence. At the same time, the British also began laying the framework for a national education system that would "provide ... for the creation of a sense of common citizenship". In 1951, they commissioned the Barnes Report on the state of Malayan education, which postulated that the British policy of providing only limited education for the Malays had shackled them to a life of few opportunities, arguing that "Now even if he [the Malay] wanted education he could no longer afford it." The report recommended the establishment of an "inter-racial primary school we call the National School" that would provide a platform for "build[ing] up a common Malay nationality". The report made no provision for non-Malay vernacular schools, stating that its proposal "would be seriously weakened if any large proportion of the Chinese, Indian and other non-Malay communities to provide their own primary classes independently of the National School". To reassure the non-Malay populace, the report guaranteed that the National School would "teach English to all", instead of Malay as many feared. Nevertheless, the proposal was resoundingly rejected by the non-Malays, especially the Chinese, who accused it of being "saturated with Malay nationalism" and bolstering ketuanan Melayu. The British commissioned another report, the Fenn-Wu Report, to provide a Chinese perspective. The Fenn-Wu Report clashed with the Barnes Report on a number of points, recommending the retention of Chinese schools and suggesting that "No element of the population can be 'Malayanized' for the simple reason that there is no 'Malayan' pattern to which to mould it ...". The Fenn-Wu Report also proposed an alteration of the Chinese vernacular syllabus to eliminate "[f]oreign politics" and recommended that texts "suitable for Malayan use should be produced". The Federal Legislative Council then set up a committee led by Thuraisingham to evaluate the reports and make a final recommendation. The eventual proposal provided for the setting up of national schools as based on the Barnes Report, without any provision for vernacular schools. Although the media of instruction would be Malay and English, vernacular language classes would be permitted in schools where 15 or more students requested them. The Chinese community protested the final proposal, but in the end, it was endorsed by the MCA and the system was established as planned with the enactment of the 1952 Education Ordinance.

In 1956, a committee headed by Tun Abdul Razak was set up to re-evaluate the education system. The Razak Report eventually recommended that vernacular primary schools be permitted to continue, but be required to adhere to a common syllabus with the national schools. However, there would be no official sanction for vernacular secondary schools, and only national secondary schools would be allowed. The Chinese community objected to the Razak Report's recommendations as well, launching an organised campaign against it. When the MCA refused to voice any dissent towards the proposal, it lost the Ipoh-Menglembu by-election held in Perak the following year. Ipoh, a largely Chinese city, became an opposition stronghold from then on, due to Chinese antipathy towards the MCA. Nevertheless, the Razak Report's recommendations were largely successful, and many of them remain as of 2006.

== Possible causes ==
According to many historians, the root cause of this strife between the ethnic communities and Malay nationalist sentiments like ketuanan Melayu was the lack of assimilation or amalgamation between the Malays and non-Malays. Because most of the migrants came as "guest workers" of the British, they felt little need to integrate into Malay society. (The Straits Chinese, most of whom were rich merchants instead of manual labourers, were an exception and managed to assimilate reasonably well, with many of them habitually speaking Malay at home, dressing in the Malay style, and preferring Malay cuisine.) Few bothered to learn the Malay language; the census taken at independence showed that only 3% of Chinese aged ten and over, and 5% of Indians in the same age group, were literate in Malay. The comparable figure for the Malays stood at 46%. British educational policies segregated the different ethnicities, providing minimal public education for the Malays, and leaving the non-Malays to their own devices. The Malays, who were predominantly rural, were not encouraged to socialise with the non-Malays, most of whom lived in towns. The economic impoverishment of the Malays, which set them apart from the better-off Chinese, also helped fan racial sentiments.

This failure to assimilate or amalgamate has in turn been blamed on the British. George Maxwell, a high ranking colonial civil servant, credited the Malay aristocracy for its acceptance of non-Malay participation in public life, and attributed political discrimination to British colonial policy:

With thirty-five years service in Malaya, and with intimate friendship with Rulers over two generations, I can say that I never heard one of them say anything that would tend to support [the exclusion of non-Malays from administrative appointments]. From the very earliest days of British protection, the Rulers have welcomed the leaders of the Chinese communities as members of their State Councils. Other [non-Malays] are now members of the State Councils. The policy of keeping [non-Malays] out of the administration owes its inception to British officials, and not to the Rulers.

On the basis of these policies, historians have argued that "Given the hostility toward Chinese expressed by many colonial officials and the lack of physical and social integration, it is not surprising that most Malays formed the opinion that Chinese were only transients in Malaya with no real attachments to the country."

Another contributing factor to ketuanan Melayu, according to historians, was the Japanese occupation during World War II. One states that the war "awakened a keen political awareness among Malayan people by intensifying communalism and racial hatred." This was widely attributed to the Japanese policies which "politicised the Malay peasantry" and intentionally fanned the flames of Malay nationalism. Racial tension was also increased by the Japanese practice of using Malay paramilitary units to fight Chinese resistance groups. Two Malay historians wrote that "The Japanese hostile acts against the Chinese and their apparently more favourable treatments of the Malays helped to make the Chinese community feel its separate identity more acutely ... it was also the beginning of racial tension between the Malays and Chinese." A foreign commentator agreed, stating that "During the occupation period ... Malay national sentiment had become a reality; it was strongly anti-Chinese, and its rallying cry [was] 'Malaya for the Malays' ...".
