= O. W. Wolters =

English historian (1915–2000)

Oliver William Wolters
- Born: 8 June 1915; Reading, England
- Died: 5 December 2000 (aged 85)
- Citizenship: British
- Education: University of Oxford (BA, 1937); SOAS (PhD, 1961)
- Scientific career
- Fields: History
- Workplaces: Cornell University
- Doctoral advisor: D.G.E. Hall
- Notable students: Barbara Watson Andaya, Leonard Andaya, Reynaldo Ileto, Charnvit Kasetsiri, Anthony Milner, Craig Reynolds, M. C. Ricklefs, Shiraishi Takashi

Oliver William Wolters OBE (8 June 1915 – 5 December 2000) was a British academic, historian and author. He was a Malayan civil servant and administrator from 1937 to 1957. He lectured at the School of Oriental and African Studies from 1957 to 1963, then taught at Cornell University from 1964 to 1984. At his death, he was the Goldwin Smith Professor of Southeast Asian History Emeritus at Cornell University.

== Selected works ==
In a statistical overview derived from writings by and about O. W. Wolters, OCLC/WorldCat encompasses roughly 20+ works in 90+ publications in 4 languages and 2,200+ library holdings.

- The Khmer King at Basan (1371-1373) and the Restoration of the Cambodian Chronology during the 14th and 15th Centuries (1965)
- Early Indonesian Commerce: a Study of the Origins of Srĭvijaya. (1962)
- Some Reflections on the Subject of Ayudhyā and the World (1967)
- Southeast Asian History and Historiography: Essays Presented to D.G.E. Hall (1976)
- History, Culture and Region in Southeast Asian Perspectives (1982)
- The Fall of Śrīvijaya in Malay History (1970)
- Culture and Region in Southeast Asian Perspectives (1982)
- Two essays on Đại-Việt in the Fourteenth Century (1988)
- Perdagangan awal Indonesia: satu kajian asal usul kerajaan Srivijaya (1989)
- Early Southeast Asia: Selected Essays (2008)
- Monologue, Dialogue, and Tran Vietnam (2009)

== Honors ==
- Guggenheim Fellowship, 1972
- Association for Asian Studies (AAS), 1990 Award for Distinguished Contributions to Asian Studies
