= Abdullah Kamil =

Indonesian diplomat (1919–1991)

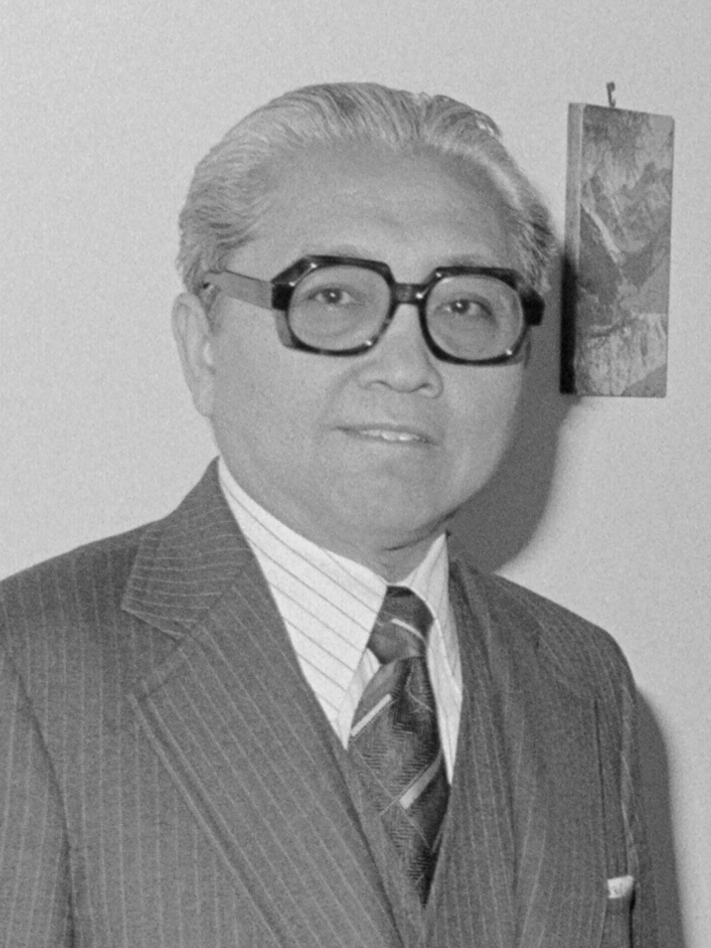
- Kamil in 1976

Director General of Political Affairs
- Acting
- In office 23 March 1983 – 28 January 1984
- Preceded by: Munawir Sjadzali
- Succeeded by: Nana Sutresna

Permanent Representative of Indonesia to the United Nations
- In office 10 April 1979 – 1982
- President: Suharto
- Preceded by: Chaidir Anwar Sani
- Succeeded by: Ali Alatas

Ambassador of Indonesia to Austria
- In office 18 January 1975 – 1979
- President: Suharto
- Preceded by: Ide Anak Agung Gde Agung
- Succeeded by: Haryono Nimpuno

Ambassador of Indonesia to Yugoslavia
- In office 1 April 1968 – 1971
- President: Suharto
- Preceded by: Suhadi
- Succeeded by: Soepardjo Rustam

Personal details
- Born: 27 December 1919 Binjai, Dutch East Indies
- Died: 11 July 1991 (aged 71) Jakarta, Indonesia
- Spouse: Acharavarn
- Children: 4
- Parent: Muhammad Nur Ismail (father)
- Relatives: Suharto (in-law)

Abdullah Kamil (27 December 1919 – 11 July 1991) was an Indonesian career diplomat who served as ambassador three times. He was Indonesia's ambassador to Yugoslavia from 1968 to 1971, to Austria from 1974 to 1979, and to the United Nations from 1979 to 1982. Born in Binjai, Abdullah initially worked as a journalist and correspondent for various magazines before joining the fledgling Indonesian diplomatic service in 1948. He occupied various domestic and overseas postings throughout his career, culminating with his ambassadorial appointments.

== Early life and journalism ==
Abdullah Kamil was born on 27 December 1919 in Binjai as the third child of Muhammad Nur Ismail, a qadhi (religious official) in the Sultanate of Langkat. He received religious education from his parents, as well as his father's disciples, including Syeikh Abdullah Afifuddin and Zainal Ariffin Abbas. Abdullah completed basic education at Taman Dewasa, a branch of the Taman Siswa education movement, and the Khalsa English School, both in Medan. He also worked as correspondent for Antara and Pewarta Deli daily as well as teaching English in school. During this period, Abdullah was active in politics as the chair of the socialist Gerindo movement in Binjai and taught political courses on socialist thoughts. His political activism led to his three-months imprisonment by the Dutch East Indies authorities for organizing an unauthorized meeting.

Political pressures from the colonial authorities led Abdullah to migrate for Kuala Lumpur, which was then a capital of the British Malaya. Upon passing his Senior Cambridge examination in 1936, Abdullah studied at the Victoria Institution for a year. His previous experience as a journalist for Pewarta Deli landed him a job as representative of the Warta Malaya newspaper in Kuala Lumpur, adopting the pen name Arif Budiman. Abdullah along with other youth activists from Malaya founded Kesatuan Melayu Muda (KMM) in 1938, which was the first leftist and national political establishment in Malaya, and he became the assistant secretary general of the organization until he moved to Penang in 1940. A year later, in 1941 he was arrested by the British authorities along with other KMM leaders at the Changi Prison. Abdullah Kamil was released along with his colleagues on 16 February 1942, a day after the fall of Singapore to the Japanese military.

To discourage the revival of the KMM, the Japanese authorities provided the KMM leaders with employment opportunities. Abdullah was employed as an editor for Berita Malai and the Semangat Asia periodical based in Singapore. In October 1943, Abdullah was sent to Tokyo as part of a linguistic lesson exchange. Abdullah became a consultant for the International Institute for Cultural Relations as well as a member of the Board of Indonesian Association. He also resumed his journalistic works as editor-in-chief of the Indonesia magazine.

== Diplomatic career ==
Abdullah began his diplomatic career in 1948 as an information officer at the Indonesian office in Bangkok. The office was upgraded to a full embassy after the end of the Indonesian National Revolution, and Abdullah was accorded the diplomatic rank of second secretary. He continued to manage the embassy's information affairs until 1952, when he was recalled to the foreign ministry as head of the information section. He briefly served at the Indonesian high commisariat in the Hague with the diplomatic rank of first secretary from October 1955 until his recall in June 1956.

From the Hague, Abdullah was sent to Kuala Lumpur consulate general as a consul in charge of information affairs, receiving his exequatur on 20 September 1956. Less than a year later, on 1 August 1957 he moved to New York to take up office as officer in charge of press and public relations at the permanent mission to the United Nations, having been promoted to the diplomatic rank of counsellor.

Between 1960 and 1965, Abdullah returned to the foreign ministry for domestic posting, at times serving as the acting director for UN and international organizations. In 1961, he underwent military education at the Indonesian Army Command and General Staff College. He was then posted to the embassy in Tunisia as its second ranked official under ambassador Max Maramis from 1965 to 1966. In 1966, shortly after Indonesia re-opened its UN permanent mission, Abdullah became the mission's chargé d'affaires ad interim with the diplomatic rank of counsellor. After former foreign minister Ruslan Abdulgani was appointed as permanent representative in 1967, Abdullah was the permanent mission's second ranked official, having been promoted to minister counsellor.

=== Ambassador to Yugoslavia ===
On 8 February 1968, President Suharto issued a decree formally appointing Abdullah as ambassador to Yugoslavia. Upon receiving his credentials on 1 April, he presented his credentials to president Josip Broz Tito on 18 May. He was recalled after three years of service in 1971 and was immediately appointed as the director of international organizations. As director, Abdullah chaired the subcommittee for the preparation of Indonesia's presence in the Seabed conference in 1972 and led the delegation to the foreign ministers of Muslim countries conference in Benghazi in 1973.

=== Ambassador to Austria ===
Abdullah was sworn in for his second ambassadorship to Austria on 18 January 1975 after receiving approval from the Austrian government in November 1974. Abdullah is also accredited to international organizations in Austria, such as the United Nations Industrial Development Organization, which he was accredited to since 21 March 1975, and the International Atomic Energy Agency. In July 1976, foreign minister Adam Malik appointed Abdullah as his special envoy to the fifth summit of the Non-Aligned Movement in Colombo, where he had talks with Malaysia's foreign minister Tengku Ahmad Rithauddeen Ismail.

=== Permanent representative to the United Nations ===
Abdullah is accredited as Indonesia's representative to the United Nations on 10 April 1979. According to diplomat Perwitorini Wijono, Abdullah rejected the foreign department's secretary general directive to recruit fresh graduates to the permanent mission, as he felt they lack experience and knowledge. Abdullah's successor, Ali Alatas, who began his term in 1982, reverted his decision and began recruiting fresh graduates as attachés.

=== Special advisor to foreign minister ===
After his service in the permanent mission, Abdullah became the foreign minister's special advisor. On 23 March 1983, Abdullah became the acting director general of politics, replacing Munawir Sjadzali who became the religion affairs minister. Although the formal handover was conducted several weeks later on 15 April, Abdullah had been accompanying foreign minister Mochtar Kusumaatmadja to the ASEAN Foreign Ministers' Meeting and the ASEAN-EEC dialogue in Bangkok since his appointment in March. Abdullah was replaced as director general by Nana Sutresna, the permanent officeholder, on 28 January 1984.

== Personal life ==
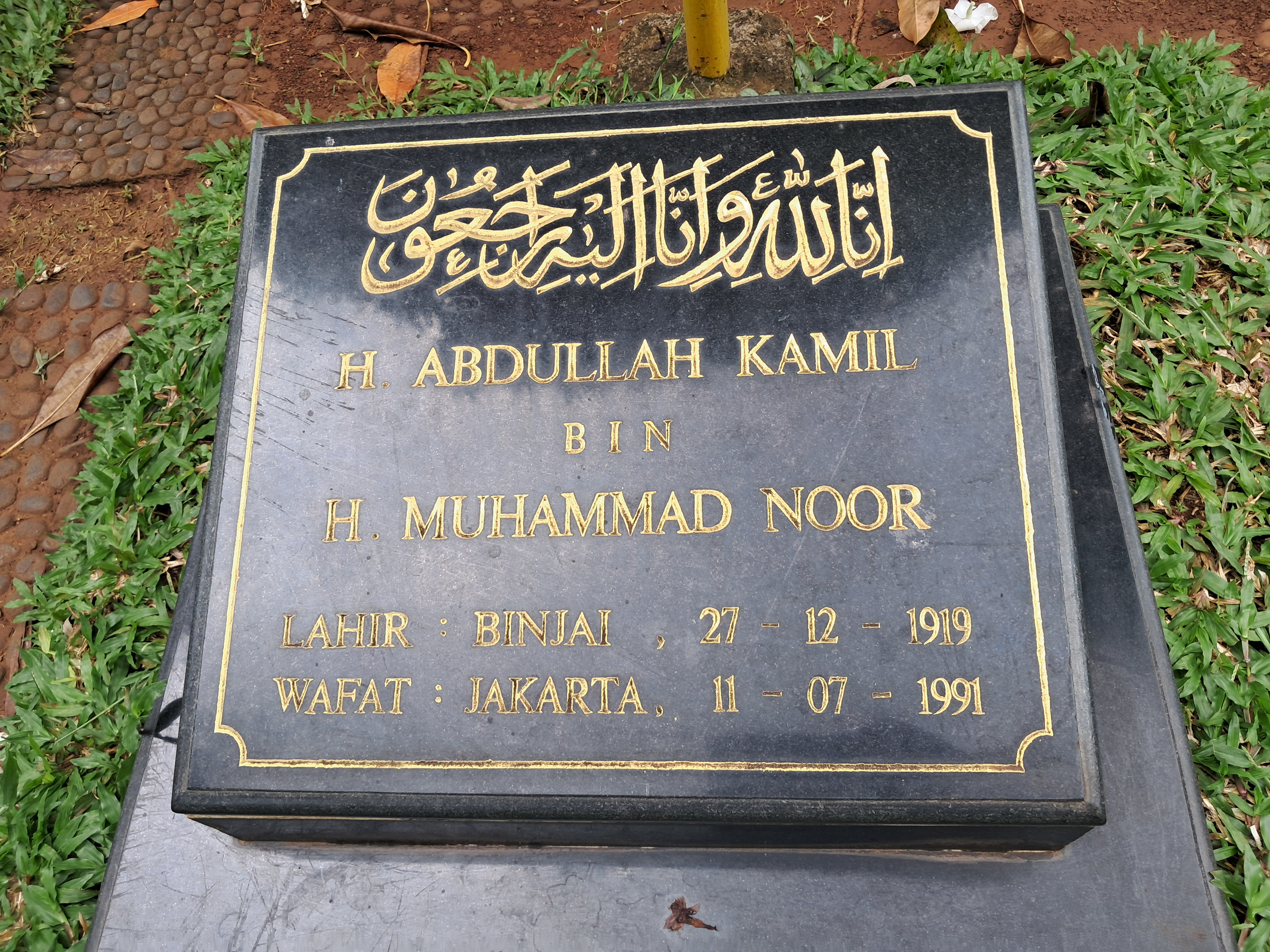
Abdullah Kamil's gravestone

Abdullah was married to Acharavarn, a Thai woman whom he met during his maiden assignment in Bangkok. The couple had a son and three daughters. His third daughter, Halimah Agustina, was married to Bambang Trihatmodjo, the son of president Suharto.

Abdullah Kamil died due to cardiac arrest on 11 July 1991 at the Gatot Soebroto Army Hospital after receiving intensive treatment from the presidential medical team for forty days. Since 1983, Abdullah had been treated at various hospitals abroad for his complications. Numerous cabinet officials, including foreign minister Ali Alatas and transport minister Azwar Anas, paid their final respects to Abdullah. Abdullah's body was interred a day later at the Tanah Kusir cemetery.

=== Cultural contributions ===
During the last decade of his life, Abdullah contributed to the development Minangkabau culture. He established the Genta Budaya foundation to support the promotion of Minangkabau culture and spent 750 million rupiah (US$ 384553) on the construction of a building to support the foundation. Abdullah, which was slated to inaugurate the building, died several months before its completion. The building, which was inaugurated by Suharto in 1992, underwent restoration by provincial and municipal authorities in 2011, and was named after Abdullah. Abdullah also chaired the Tunas Harapan foundation which supports children born with disabilities and closely worked with the Suharto-owned Harapan Kita hospital.
