= Warta Malaya =

Former newspaper in Singapore

- Leading Malay Daily Newspaper in Malaya
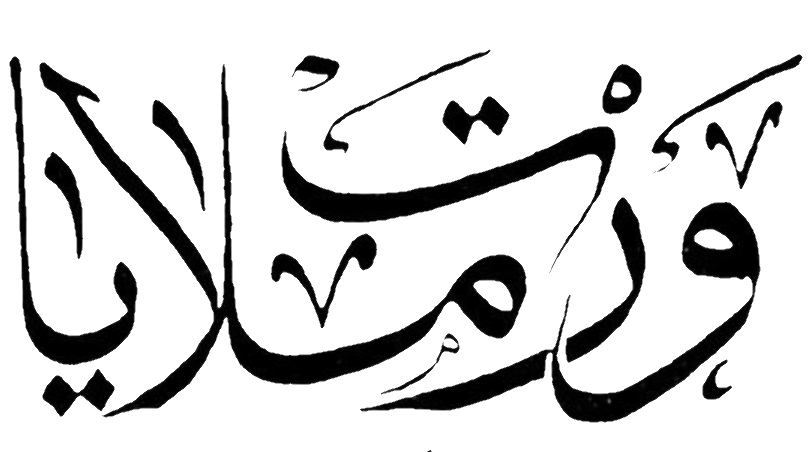

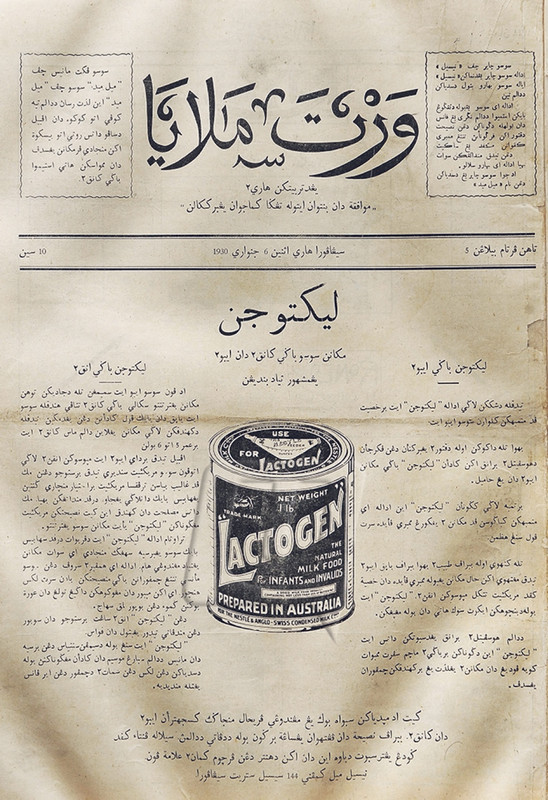
- Warta Malaya (1 January 1937)
- Type: Daily newspaper
- Owners: Syed Hussein bin Ali Alsagoff (1930-1941); Ibrahim Yaacob (1941-1942)
- Founder: Syed Hussein bin Ali Alsagoff
- Publisher: Anglo-Asiatic Press Ltd. (1930-1933); Warta Malaya Press Ltd. (1934-1941)
- Editor-in-chief: Onn Jaafar (first); Ibrahim Yaacob (last)
- Founded: 1 January 1930
- Ceased publication: 14 August 1942
- Language: Malay
- Headquarters: 185, Cecil Street, Singapore.
- Country: British Singapore

Warta Malaya (English: Malayan Report), also known as Warta Melayu, was a Singaporean and Malayan Malay-language daily newspaper. Written in Jawi script, the newspaper released its first issue in 1930. It later emerged as one of the highest circulating Malay newspapers of the 1930s. The newspaper was politically involved in the early stages of Malay nationalism, and became a paper for the Kesatuan Melayu Muda, an early Malayan left-wing political party. The final issue of the newspaper was published in 1942.

== History ==
Warta Malaya was printed by Anglo-Asiatic Press Limited, founded in 1929 by Syed Hussein bin Ali Alsagoff, part of the Alsagoff family at Singapore. The first issue of the newspaper was officially published on 1 January 1930, at a price of 10 cents each. The original edition had 12 pages, but within a month it was expanded to 16. On 1 January 1934, Anglo-Asiatic Press Limited was renamed to Warta Malaya Press Limited. Prices per copy were reduced to 6 cents each due to rising profits. The success of the newspaper led to the release of two weekly companions, the Warta Ahad ("Sunday Times") in 1935, and Warta Jenaka ("The Comedian") in 1936.

The paper, characterized as "fiery and pungent", aimed to raise issues related to the Malay race and to alert Malays of ongoing events throughout the world. The paper covered events in Muslim countries outside Singapore and British Malaya, and claimed to be the first Malay-newspaper to subscribe to international news agencies. The paper discussed a wide range of issues affecting Malay rights, including education, political rights, and the economy. The staff of the newspaper included future prominent political figures of both Singapore and Malaya. Former staffs include Onn Jaafar, the first president of the United Malays National Organisation (UMNO), Abdul Rahim Kajai, dubbed as the "Father of Malay Journalism", and Yusof Ishak, the first President of Singapore.

In April 1941, Ibrahim Yaacob, a Malayan nationalist, and then-president of the Kesatuan Melayu Muda (KMM), bought the newspaper for use of anti-British propaganda. After the Fall of Singapore in 1942, the newspaper was permitted by the Japanese military government at Singapore. The newspaper ceased publications on 14 August 1942.

== Editors ==
The first editor of the newspaper was Onn Jaafar, who remained in his position from 1930 to 1933. He was replaced by Syed Sheikh Syed Ahmad Al-Hadi (1933-34), a notable leader in the Kaum Muda movement, supportive of progressive Islam under Islamic modernism. Syed Hussein bin Ali Alsagoff, the proprietor of the newspaper, took control after 1934 until 1941. Ibrahim Yaacob became the final editor until its closure in 1942.

List of editors of Warta Malaya (1930-1945)
Editor	Appointed	Departed
Onn Jaafar	1930	1933
Syed Sheikh Syed Ahmad Al-Hadi	1933	1934
Syed Hussein bin Ali Alsagoff	1934	1941
Ibrahim Yaacob	1941	1942

== See also ==
- Warta Negara
- Utusan Melayu
