= Tan Cheng Lock =

Malaysian politician, 1st president of the Malaysian Chinese Association

Yang Amat Berbahagia Tun Dato' Sir Cheng Lock Tan SMN DPMJ KBE JP
- 陳禎祿
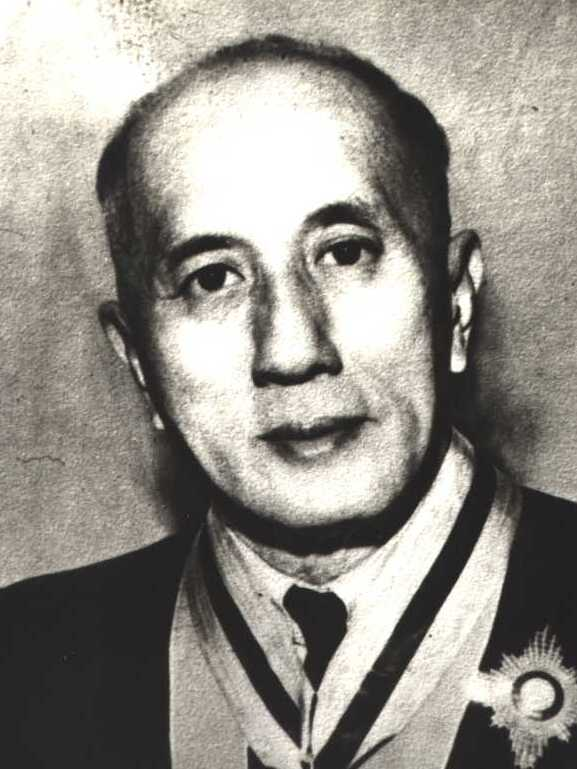

President of the Malayan Chinese Association
- In office 27 February 1949 – 27 March 1958
- Preceded by: Position established
- Succeeded by: Lim Chong Eu

Personal details
- Born: 5 April 1883 Malacca, Straits Settlements
- Died: 13 December 1960 (aged 77) Malacca, Federation of Malaya
- Party: Malayan Chinese Association
- Spouse: Yeo Yeok Neo
- Children: 5, including Siew Sin
- Education: Malacca High School; Raffles Institution
- Occupation: Businessman

Tun Dato' Sir Cheng Lock Tan (5 April 1883 – 13 December 1960) was a Malaysian Peranakan businessman and a key public figure who devoted his life to fighting for the rights and the social welfare of the Chinese community in Malaya. Tan was also the founder and the first president of the Malayan Chinese Association (MCA), which advocated his cause for the Malayan Chinese population.

== Background ==
Born on 5 April 1883, Tan was the third son of Tan Keong Ann (Note: Chinese: 陳恭安; Pe̍h-ōe-jī: Tân Kiong-an) who had seven sons and daughters, and was a fifth generation Peranakan-Hokkien Chinese Malaysian living at 111 Jalan Heeren in Malacca. His ancestor, Tan Hay Kwan (Note: Chinese: 陳夏觀; Pe̍h-ōe-jī: Tân Hē͘-kuan) a junk owner and trader, had migrated to Malacca from Zhangzhou prefecture in Fujian Province, China in 1771. His grandfather, Tan Choon Bok, (Note: Chinese: 陳春木; Pe̍h-ōe-jī: Tân Chhun-bo̍k) was very wealthy but he felt his four sons were unworthy to inherit his business empire and wealth and locked his assets in a family trust which ended 84 years after he died, in 1964. By then Tan Cheng Lock had been dead for four years. Tan Cheng Lock's father, Tan Keong Ann, was so devastated by his 'disinheritance' that he railed at his father's portrait daily and took to drink. He did not try to earn a living to support his family and instead lived off his annual allowance of $130 (Straits dollars) from the family trust in genteel poverty. Tan Cheng Lock refused to emulate his father.

The young Tan attended Malacca High School and won the Tan Teck Guan Scholarship awarded to top performers in the school. He later continued his education at the Raffles Institution in Singapore. He was unable to proceed to England to study law due to his financial situation so he decided to teach instead, and taught at the Raffles Institution from 1902 to 1908. He was unhappy with his lot and was too impatient to be a teacher, so his mother, Lee Seck Bin, insisted he return to Malacca to work as an assistant manager of the Bukit Kajang Rubber Estates Ltd., a company which belonged to his maternal cousin, Lee Chim Tuan. Being a rubber planter suited him and he was a quick learner. Soon he was appointed visiting agent to Nyalas Rubber Estates in Malacca in 1909. In 1910, Tan was involved in the founding of three rubber companies. He started United Malacca Rubber Estate Ltd. himself, and he obtained the assistance of other businessmen to jointly set up Malacca Pinda Rubber Estates Ltd. and Ayer Molek Rubber Company, Ltd.

Three years later in 1912, he was nominated as Malacca Council Commissioner and a Justice of the Peace for Malacca by the British government. Months later, he was also nominated as the Commissioner of the Town Council for the towns and Malacca port as well. In 1914, he resuscitated the Chinese Company of the Malacca Volunteer Corps (later also known as B Company, 4th Battalion, Straits Settlement Volunteer Force) and served as a private for five years until 1919. In 1915, he revived the Straits Chinese British Association (SCBA), electing him as the President of SCBA soon after. In 1923, at the age of 40, he was appointed as a nominated member of the Legislative Council of the Straits Settlements.

In 1926, Tan made a speech to the legislative council about the ideals of a territorially and politically united Malaya. Like many Straits-born Chinese of his time, Tan was partial towards Britain but was deeply influenced by ideas of independence which were sweeping across many British colonies. He advocated for a "united self-governing British Malaya". From 1933 to 1935, he was an unofficial member of the Straits Settlements Executive Council. He championed social causes like opposing opium smoking, promoting Chinese vernacular education, legislating against polygamy and pressing for immigration policy reform. During the Japanese occupation of Malaya, Tan and his family lived in exile in India. They witnessed the struggles of Mahatma Gandhi and Pandit Jawaharlal Nehru for independence during their stay in India, which inspired them to do the same for Malaya when they returned.

== The Malayan Chinese Association ==
Tan returned to Malacca after the Japanese surrendered. On 27 February 1949, Tan founded the Malayan Chinese Association (MCA) alongside Tun Leong Yew Koh and Colonel H. S. Lee. Although he was 66 when elected to the position, Tan was regarded as the only man able to bring the Malayan Chinese together.

The post-war years and the Emergency was a difficult and dangerous juncture for the community. The Chinese were deeply divided and their loyalty was under scrutiny. Among the Chinese, only Tan had the stature to engage with senior Malays such as Datuk Onn Jaafar and Tunku Abdul Rahman. Strongly anti-communist, he was also trusted by the British colonial officials. He joined the Malay leaders – first through the All-Malaya Council of Joint Action, which he chaired, and then the Communities Liaison Committee headed by Dato' Sir E. E. C. Thuraisingham – to fight for constitutional change and work towards inter-ethnic co-operation. Tan organized a hartal (general strike) in Malacca to protest against the British colonial government.

The establishment of the Federation of Malaya did not go down well with the ethnic Chinese, as favourable conditions for obtaining citizenship for the Chinese and other non-Malays were withdrawn. Tan Cheng Lock frequently raised grievances over the citizenship terms that were set when the federation was established. As a result, communal tensions between the Malays and Chinese surfaced, and Onn Jaafar, who was then heading UMNO kept his distance from Tan. Tan encountered initial difficulties with meeting Sultan Ibrahim of Johor, who was not accustomed to working with Chinese businessmen.

The goal for the foundation of the Malayan Chinese Association was to unite the Chinese population in Malaya, including the protection of the rights and interests of the Chinese, to work with the colonial government to stop the spread of communism and to work with other races to achieve independence for Malaya. The MCA branches had been set up after their campaigns had attracted more than 200,000 members.

On 26 September 1951, he supported Onn Jaafar's idea to form the Independence of Malaya Party (IMP) in Kuala Lumpur with co-operation of various races as its theme. However, the formation was choppy, due to the fact that Onn Jaafar was not co-operative on the issue of citizenship.

In the end, Tan decided that only a Chinese party could safeguard the interests of his community and that multi-ethnic co-operation was more likely to be achieved through partnership with UMNO. With that, the MCA joined with UMNO to form the Alliance Party, the precursor to the Barisan Nasional. However some people do not agree that he acted in best interest of Malaysian Chinese as some felt that the marginalization of Malaysian Chinese would not be so severe had the British continued to rule citing Hong Kong as an example.

In 1952, Tan Cheng Lock and the United Malays National Organisation (UMNO) under Tunku Abdul Rahman's leadership contested the election as partners. He was best remembered for his contributions in the business and political arenas and his work for integrating between the Chinese and the Indian communities to Malayan society.

Under Tan Cheng Lock, the MCA played a vital role in negotiating independence from the British; he was also in charge as the MCA formed the Alliance in 1954 in coalition with the United Malays National Organisation and the Malaysian Indian Congress. Tan, who was a member of the Malayan Anti-Japanese League, was MCA's first president, but did not enter the cabinet on independence because his rival, Tun H.S. Lee, from Selangor, was part of the cabinet.

Prior to the independence of Malaya, he was also a member of the Legislative Council of the Straits Settlements. In 1952, Tan Cheng Lock and the United Malays National Organisation (UMNO) under Tunku Abdul Rahman's leadership contested the election as partners. He was best remembered for his contributions in the business and political arenas and his work for integrating between the Chinese and the Indian communities to the nascent Malayan society.

Tan died of a heart attack on 16 December 1960 at the age of 77. His son, Tan Siew Sin became the 3rd President of MCA after his death.

== Legacy ==
Many tributes were made to Tan, for his contributions to Malaysia. Besides being recognised as one of the founding fathers of modern-day Malaysia, along with Tunku Abdul Rahman, Tun Abdul Razak and Tun V.T. Sambanthan, the street named Foch Avenue, adjacent to the Petaling Street was renamed Jalan Tun Tan Cheng Lock in Kuala Lumpur after 1957. The former Cross Street was renamed Tan Siew Sin Street in honour of Tan's son, a former Finance Minister of Malaysia. In Malacca, Heeren Street where Tan's family home and the place of his birth was situated was also renamed Jalan Tun Tan Cheng Lock in his honour. In 2002, a school was built at Subang Jaya in the state of Selangor and was named SJKC Tun Tan Cheng Lock.

In April 2005, the National University of Singapore (NUS) received a private donation of S$4 million from Ms Agnes Tan, the last surviving daughter of Tan Cheng Lock, to acquire a Peranakan house on Neil Road in Singapore. Another donation of S$1.5 million was made for the purpose of acquiring two other houses on Jalan Tun Tan Cheng Lock in Malacca for the conservation and promotion of Peranakan architecture and culture in Singapore, Indonesia and Malaysia. The house in Singapore was named the Tan Cheng Lock Baba House, in honour of Tan's strong belief in education.

== Honours ==
=== Honours of Malaya ===
- Malaya
  - Grand Commander of the Order of the Defender of the Realm (SMN) – Tun (1958)
- Johor
  - Knight Commander of the Order of the Crown of Johor (DPMJ) – Dato' (1949)

=== British Commonwealth Honours ===
- United Kingdom
  - Commander of the Order of the British Empire (CBE) (1933)
  - King George V Silver Jubilee Medal (1935)
  - Knight Commander of the Order of the British Empire (KBE) – Sir (1952)

== Notes ==
Political offices
Preceded by Party newly found	Malayan Chinese Association (MCA) President; 27 February 1949 – 27 March 1958	Succeeded by Lim Chong Eu
