= Communities Liaison Committee =

The Communities Liaison Committee (CLC) was established in 1949 by the British rulers of Malaysia, comprising the top echelon of Malayan politicians from different communities, to address sensitive issues, especially those related to ethnicity. Compromises on a number of issues, including citizenship, education, democracy, and Malay supremacy, were agreed on and set the stage for Malayan independence. The CLC was chaired by Malcolm MacDonald, the British Commissioner-General for Southeast Asia.

The Communities Liaison Committee was a prototype for multiracial political cooperation.

== Composition ==
No.	Member	Notes
Advisor
1	Malcolm MacDonald	Governor-General of British territories in Southeast Asia
Chairman
2	E.E.C. Thuraisingham	Ceylonese representative
Malay Representative
3	Onn Jaafar	Menteri Besar of Johor, President of UMNO
4	Dato' Abdul Wahab Abdul Aziz	Menteri Besar of Perak
5	Mohd. Salleh Hakim	Member of Selangor State Legislative Council
6	Dr. Mustapha Osman	Member of UMNO Working Committee
7	Zainal Abidin Haji Abas	Secretary-General of UMNO
Chinese Representative
8	Tan Cheng Lock	Melaka
9	Lee Tiang Keng	Penang
10	C.C Tan	Singapore
11	Yong Shook Lin	Selangor
Others
12	Roland Braddell	European representative
13	L.R. Doraisamy Iyer	Indian representative
14	Dr. J.S. Goonting	Serani people representative
