= Anthony Milner (historian) =

Australian historian

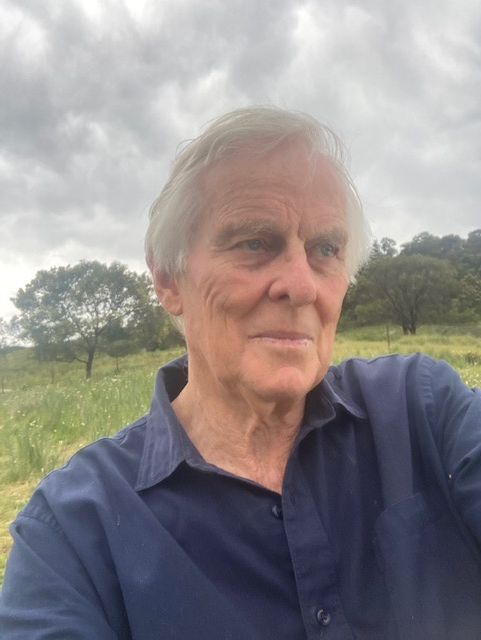
Milner in December 2021

Anthony Crothers Milner is an Australian historian of Southeast Asia, focused primarily on the history of ideas, and a commentator on Australia–Asia relationships.

His writings on Malay history and society and the history of Islam in Southeast Asia include Kerajaan: Malay Political Culture on the Eve of Colonial Rule (1982), an interdisciplinary (history/anthropology) study, published in a new edition in 2016. He is also co-editor of the series of volumes, Australia in Asia (see below), which examine the role of culture and values in Australia-Asia relationships; and of the Asialink report on Australia-ASEAN relations, Our Place in the Asian Century: Southeast Asia as the Third Way (2012). Milner is professorial fellow and international director at Asialink, The University of Melbourne, and visiting professor at the Asia-Europe Institute, Universiti Malaya. He was dean of Asian studies at the Australian National University (1996–2005), and Basham Professor of Asian History (1994–2013). He is now emeritus professor of the Australian National University.

Milner has been concerned with the historical and cultural processes that shape the Asian region, and which also influence Australia's opportunities and security. In the last few years he has been focused on defining Southeast Asian – especially Malaysian – approaches to international relations and regionalism. He is described, sometimes critically, as adopting a post-modern approach. Milner has been a strong advocate of Track II diplomacy – arguing that the globalising and democratising of international relations demands an enhanced role for non-government interaction.

Milner is co-chair of the Australian Committee of the Council for Security Cooperation in the Asia-Pacific. He has also played a leading role in the development of the Asialink Conversations, and in the establishment of an Australia–New Zealand dialogue with the influential network ASEAN-ISIS. He has been Research Chair of the Australian Institute of International Affairs and editor of the Asian Studies Review of the Asian Studies Association of Australia. Milner has lamented the neglect of Asia education and the general "narrowing of cultural horizons on the part of the Australian community".

Milner has also been member at the Institute for Advanced Study in Princeton, New Jersey, and has held visiting professorships at the National University of Singapore (Raffles Visiting professor of history), Tokyo University of Foreign Studies, Kyoto University, Humboldt University, National University of Malaysia, and Universiti Malaya. In the 1990s, he was director of the Australia-Asia Perceptions Project at the Academy of the Social Sciences in Australia. He has been a member of the Australian Government's Foreign Affairs Council (1998–2008), a panel member on the Australian Research Council, and a member of the Founding Committees of the Government's Australia-Malaysia Institute and Australia-Thailand Institute.

Milner received his B.A from Monash University and PhD from Cornell University under John Legge and Oliver Wolters. He also worked with the leading international cultural anthropologist Clifford Geertz and the prominent historian, Wang Gungwu.

== Awards ==
Awarded Member of the Order of Australia (AM) in 2007 for "service to education in the field of Asian studies as an academic and author, and to international relations through the development of cross-cultural education and outreach activities". He was elected a Fellow of the Academy of the Social Sciences in Australia in 1995 and a Fellow of the Royal Historical Society in 2017, and was made a National Life Member of the Australian Institute of International Affairs in 2007. He became a Fellow of the Australian Institute of International Affairs in 2019. In 2017 he received the prestigious Merdeka Award for "outstanding contribution to the People of Malaysia". He was presented with an Honorary Degree as Doctor of Humanities by Universiti Malaya in the same year.

== Personal life ==
Milner is the son of Norman and Audrey Milner. His wife, Claire, is the daughter of David and Freda Dexter.

== Publications ==
- Kerajaan: Malay Political Culture on the Eve of Colonial Rule (American Association of Asian Studies Monograph, 1982; Thai translation, 2008) – selected as one of the 25 "works of major importance to historical studies" in Southeast Asian history by the Association for Asian Studies in the USA on behalf of the American Council of Learned Societies. ISBN 0-8165-0772-4. National Library of Australia catalogue
- (With Hooker, V.), Perceptions of the Haj, (Singapore, Institute of Southeast Asian Studies, 1984). ISBN 9971-902-83-4. National Library of Australia catalogue
- (Co-ed, with Marr, D.), Southeast Asia in the 9th to 14th Centuries, (Singapore, Institute of Southeast Asian Studies, 1986). ISBN 9971-988-40-2. National Library of Australia catalogue
- (Co-ed, with Herbert, P.), South-East Asia: Languages and Literature, A select guide, (Whiting Bay, Kiscadale, 1988; Honolulu, University of Hawaii Press, 1989). ISBN 1-870838-10-6. National Library of Australia catalogue
- (Ed, with Gerstle, D.), Recovering the Orient: Artists, Scholars, Appropriations, (London, Harwood Press, 1994). ISBN 3-7186-5687-6. National Library of Australia catalogue
- The Invention of Politics in Colonial Malaya, (Cambridge, New York and Melbourne, Cambridge University Press, 1995, 2002). ISBN 0-521-46565-6. National Library of Australia catalogue and N2000971
- (Ed, with Quilty, M.), Australia in Asia (3 Vols), (Melbourne, Oxford University Press, 1996–2000). ISBN 0-19-553672-X. National Library of Australia catalogue, 1764159 and 1194330
- Region, Security and the Return of History, (Singapore, Institute of Southeast Asian Studies, 2003, p1-59). ISBN 981-230-221-2. National Library of Australia catalogue
- The Malays, (Oxford, Blackwell, 2008, 2012). ISBN 978-0-631-17222-2. National Library of Australia catalogue
- (Ed, with Abdul Rahman Embong and Tham Siew Yean), Transforming Malaysia: Dominant and Competing Paradigms (Singapore: Institute of Southeast Asian Studies, 2014). ISBN 978 981 4517 91 1
- Asia-Australia (history), in Galligan, B. & Roberts, W. (eds), The Oxford Companion to Australian Politics, Melbourne, Oxford University Press, 2007, p43-45. ISBN 978-0-19-555543-1. National Library of Australia catalogue
- (with Tomoko Akami) 'Australia in the Asia Pacific' in Alison Bashford and Stuart Macintyre (eds) Cambridge History of Australia. Vol 2: The Commonwealth of Australia (Cambridge: Cambridge University Press, 2013), 537–560
- (with Sheryn Lee), ‘Practical vs. Identity Regionalism: Australia’s APC initiative, a case study’, Contemporary Politics, 20:2, 2014: 209–228
- (with Sally Percival Wood), Our Place in the Asian Century: Southeast Asia as The Third Way (Melbourne: Asialink Commission, 2012), 1–44
- Balancing 'Asia' Against Australian Values, in Cotton, J & Ravenhill, J. (eds), The National Interest in A Global Era: Australia in World Affairs 1996–2000, Melbourne, Oxford University Press, 2001, p31-50. ISBN 0-19-551525-0. National Library of Australia catalogue
- What Happened to 'Asian Values'?, in Segal, G. & Goodman, D. (eds), Towards Recovery in Pacific Asia, London, Routledge, 2000, p55-68. ISBN 0-415-22353-9. National Library of Australia catalogue
- 'Regionalism in Asian ', in Juliet Love (ed), The Far East and Australasia 2019 (New York and London: Routledge, 2018)
- 'Culture and the international relations of Asia', The Pacific Review, Vol. 30 No. 6, p857-869
- (Co-ed, with Gareth Knapman and Mary Quilty), Liberalism and the British Empire in Southeast Asia (London and New York: Routledge, 2018. ISBN 978-1-138-08205-2
- (Co-ed, with Azirah Hashim), Malaysian Perspectives on ASEAN Regionalism (Kuala Lumpur: University of Malaya Press, 2019) ISBN 978-967-488-090-3
- ‘Long-term themes in Malaysian Foreign Policy: hierarchy diplomacy, non-interference and moral balance’, Asian Studies Review, 44: 1, 2020, 117–135
- ‘Malaysia’s multi-monarchy: surviving colonisation and decolonisation’, in Robert Aldrich and Cindy McCreery (eds), Monarchies and Decolonisation in Asia (Manchester: Manchester University Press, 2020), 95–111. ISBN 978 1 5261 4269 6
