= Greater Indonesia =

Geopolitical concept

Republik Indonesia
- Flag Seal

- Map of Greater Indonesia, including Indonesia, Malaysia, Brunei, Singapore, and East Timor. The total area will be 2,256,823.3 km2 (871,364.3 sq mi).

Greater Indonesia (Indonesian: Indonesia Raya) was an irredentist political concept that sought to bring the so-called Malay race together, by uniting the territories of the Dutch East Indies (and Portuguese Timor) with British Malaya and British Borneo. It was espoused by students and graduates of Sultan Idris Training College for Malay Teachers in the late 1920s, and individuals from Sumatra and Java, including Mohammad Natsir and Sukarno, on 28 September 1950. Indonesia Raya was adopted as the name of what later became the Indonesian national anthem in 1924.

While the definition of Greater Indonesia is consistent, the definition of Greater Malay (Malay: Melayu Raya) and the related concept of the Malay world and realm (Malay: Dunia Melayu and Alam Melayu) varies, from being virtually synonymous with Greater Indonesia to a Peninsular-focused dominance.

== Ancient and colonial maritime South East Asia ==
The ancient concept of Nusantara advocates an historical awareness that the territory of British Malaya, British Borneo and the Dutch East Indies (approximately Maritime Southeast Asia) were once united, Especially when in 1824 AD the London Treaty place, the British and Dutch power exchange, when the Dutch colonial government replaced the British to rule in the Bengkulu-British Residency Area including the area Kepaksian Paksi Pak Sekala Brak in Batu Brak on the of Krui, Sumatra, under native empires such as Srivijaya, Majapahit, and the Sultanates of Malacca Sultanate, Johor Sultanate and various other kingdom in Borneo island. The existence of Srivijaya in the history of archipelagic Southeast Asia intersected with the land-based Javanese kingdom of Majapahit (c.1293–1520). The crossing of paths of the Srivijaya and Majapahit kingdoms, two historical centres of power in maritime Southeast Asia, appears to have resulted in the sort of power struggle that has defined international relations through the centuries. A recurring theme that has imposed itself on the historiography of the Indo-Malay Archipelago has been conflict born of the apprehension of peoples in the region concerning Javanese domination. Many other instances can be found to illustrate how the Majapahit court in Java sought to exercise influence over the Malay principalities. Extrapolating from this, these historical misgivings haunted the pan-nationalist movements that agitated for Indonesia Raya and Melayu Raya.

Three features need to be stressed about the nineteenth- and twentieth century colonial contribution to the development of the ‘Malay race’. First, in the formulation of Raffles and some others – a formulation that was especially influential – the demographic scope envisaged for ‘Malay’ was relatively narrow. The second feature to highlight in the colonial formulation is that alongside the relatively narrow Raffles definition of ‘Malay’, and an expressed interest in determining racial origins, other more relaxed formulations continued to operate, though sometimes informally. Having promoted the Malay language, the Dutch might have promoted ‘Malay’ as the inclusive term for the people of the ‘Indies’ – but they did not do so as Natives (Dutch: Inlanders) was often used, and sometimes Indian (Dutch: Indier). The third feature to note in the colonial influence on the construction of ‘the Malays’ is of particular importance when we come to the problems arising in the propagation of Malayness in the ‘Malay’ community itself: it is that the idea of ‘race’ carried an egalitarian ethic.

The Pan-Malay union was based on understandings on similarities in race, shared language, religion and culture among ethnic groups in Maritime Southeast Asia. At the end of the 1920s, the idea to form a new independent nation grew among the people of Dutch East Indies, especially among educated pribumi (native Indonesian). While in the Malay peninsula, the idea of Greater Malay was proposed. In the Dutch East Indies, the activist youth of Indonesian nationalists were more interested in forming an independent Indonesia. In 1928 the Youth Pledge was declared in Batavia (today Jakarta) by Indonesian nationalist youth activists proclaiming three ideals; one motherland, one nation, and support one unifying language. The Malay nationalist Kesatuan Melayu Muda group, founded in 1938 by Ibrahim Yaacob, was one of the more notable entities that embraced the concept as part of its goals.

== World War II ==
During World War II advocates of Greater Indonesia collaborated with the Empire of Japan against the British and the Dutch. The co-operation was based on the understanding that Japan would unite the Dutch East Indies, Malaya and Borneo and grant them independence. It was understood that under a unified Japanese occupation of these areas, the formation of Greater Indonesia was possible.

In January 1942, Kesatuan Melayu Muda (KMM) requested the Japanese to grant Malaya the independence the Japanese had promised earlier. This was the first request for Malayan independence by a Malaya-wide political body. The request however was turned down. The Japanese authorities instead disbanded Kesatuan Melayu Muda and established the Malayan Volunteer Army in its stead.

In July 1945, Union of Indonesian Peninsular People (Kesatuan Rakyat Indonesia Semenanjung, abbreviated as KRIS), that later the name would be changed to "Kekuatan Rakyat Indonesia Istimewa" (Special Indonesian People Force) was formed in British Malaya under the leadership of Ibrahim Yaacob and Burhanuddin al-Helmy with the aim to achieve independence from Great Britain and union with Republic of Indonesia. This plan has been consulted with Sukarno and Hatta.

On 12 August 1945, Ibrahim Yaacob met with Sukarno, Hatta and Dr. Rajiman Wediodiningrat in Taiping (Malaysia), Perak. Sukarno transited in Taiping airport on his flight back from Saigon back to Jakarta. Previously Sukarno was summoned by Field Marshal Hisaichi Terauchi in Dalat to discuss about the Indonesian independence and to receive direct statement from Terauchi that the Empire of Japan permitted the independence of Indonesia. During this meeting Yaacob expressed his intention to unite Malay Peninsula into independent Indonesia. It was in this short conference that Sukarno, flanked by Hatta, shook hands with Ibrahim Yaacob and said, 'Let us form one single Motherland for all the sons of Indonesia'.

Sukarno and Muhammad Yamin were Indonesian political figures who agreed with the idea of this great union. However, they were reluctant to call this idea "Melayu Raya" and offered another name, namely "Indonesia Raya". Essentially both Malay Raya and Greater Indonesia are the exact same political ideas. Reluctance to name the Great Malay because it is different from in Malaya, in Indonesia the term Malay refers more to the Malay tribe which is considered only as one of the various tribes in the archipelago, which has an equal position with Minangkabau, Aceh, Java, Sunda, Madura, Bali, Dayak, Bugis, Makassar, Minahasa, Ambon, and so on. Association based on race or "Malay" ethnic group is feared to be vulnerable and counter-productive with the unity of Indonesia which includes various ethnic groups, religions, cultures and races because many ethnic groups in Eastern Indonesia such as Papuans, Ambonese and East Nusa Tenggara, are not included Austronesian Malay family, but the Melanesian family.

However, on 15 August 1945 Emperor Hirohito declared the surrender of the Empire of Japan through radio broadcast. Promptly, Sukarno and Hatta declared Indonesian independence on 17 August 1945. After Indonesia proclaimed its independence, the Kesatuan Melayu Muda (KMM) was disappointed that Malaya was not included as part of Indonesia and they demanded its promise to Sukarno and other Indonesian leaders according to the discussion in Taiping, Perak.

However, because the situation was not safe, Sukarno and Hatta decided to postpone the Malaya unification talks. Ibrahim Yacoob was asked by Sukarno not to return to Malaya for a while, given the situation in Malaya was chaotic and the British army had already landed there to reoccupy the colony.

Accused as a collaborator, on 19 August Ibrahim Yaacob flew in Japanese military aeroplane to Jakarta. Yaacob sought refuge in Jakarta with his wife Mariatun Haji Siraj, his in-law Onan Haji Siraj and Hassan Manan. Ibrahim Yaacob that fought for the unity of Malay Peninsula into Indonesia then resides in Jakarta until his death in 1979.

With the surrender of Japan in August 1945, former Kesatuan Melayu Muda cadres formed the nucleus of the emerging political movements like the Malay Nationalist Party, Angkatan Pemuda Insaf, and Angkatan Wanita Sedar. With the fall of Japanese power in August 1945, and its key advocates are accused as traitors and Japanese collaborators in Malaya, the ideas of the union between the peninsula with Indonesia were faded and almost forgotten in Malay peninsula.

On the other hand, after the Proclamation of Indonesian Independence, through diplomacy during the Indonesian National Revolution between 1945 and 1949, the Republic of Indonesia finally gained independence from the Netherlands during Dutch–Indonesian Round Table Conference in 1949. While across the straits, after Japanese occupation, the Malay Peninsula returned to British control.

== Post-World War II and the Confrontation ==
After the end of World War II, the idea of Greater Indonesia was little heard until more than five years later. In Indonesia, where the possibility of a political unit extending across both the Dutch and British Archipelago was considered briefly, and then rejected, the ‘Malay’ idea was simply not a powerful one. Even when considering the combined state it was thought of as ‘Indonesia Raya’, not ‘Melayu Raya’, and in the declaration of Indonesian independence on 17 August 1945 the phrase used was “We, the bangsa Indonesia”. The rulers (royal courts and kerajaan) were accused of collaborating with the Dutch – who were fighting to regain control of their empire from Sukarno and the Republic – and were also condemned as being “antiquated” and “smelling” of feudalism. The kerajaan leadership was compromised in Sumatera and Kalimantan by its past association with the Dutch, and then its involvement in the Dutch attempts in the late 1940s to set up a federal scheme. On 17 August 1950 President Sukarno officially dissolved The United States of Indonesia and replaced by a unitary Republic of Indonesia. On 28 September 1950 Ambon was invaded and incorporated into the Republic of Indonesia. Between 1950 and 1962 Sukarno made preparations for an invasion of West New Guinea under the euphemism of a liberation after the Netherlands had made preparations for self-determination for the area of West New Guinea. After the New York Agreement, Dutch New Guinea was handed over to the United Nations in 1962. Sukarno strongly opposed the British decolonisation initiative involving the formation of the Federation of Malaysia that would comprise the Malay Peninsula and North Borneo. That hostile political stance led to the Indonesia–Malaysia Confrontation in the early 1960s that was manifested in an undeclared war with small scale trans-border battles and military infiltration in Borneo. Sukarno accused the new nation of Malaysia of being a British puppet state aimed at establishing neo-imperialism and neo-colonialism in Southeast Asia, and also at containing Indonesian ambition to be the regional hegemonic power. It was also suggested that Sukarno's campaign against the formation of Malaysia was motivated by a desire to separate Malaya, North Borneo, Sarawak, and Singapore as a separate country, hence not submitting to the British proposal for decolonization calling it as neocolonialism done by the British state as a way of spreading British hegemony in the region.

In British Malaya, the ‘Malays’ were perceived to have established relatively favourable relations with the Japanese during the Japanese occupation had implications after the Japanese surrender. ‘Chinese’ groups which engaged in the anti-Japanese resistance movement took revenge on ‘Malays’ who they believed had been informers, or had just cooperated with the Japanese. After a few months some stability returned, partly because the British military administration had begun to encourage the sultans to calm their subjects. A second and equally serious threat to ‘Malay’ interests was the formulation by the British government to introduce a political structure, known as the Malayan Union, in which the sultans would no longer hold sovereignty and ‘Malays’ would lose their privileged status over ‘Chinese’ and other citizens. The campaign against the Malayan Union – portrayed as a common threat to ‘Malays’ right across the Peninsula – was also a time when the bangsa Melayu concept was much strengthened. It was not the radical elite – people in the Malay Nationalist Party, for instance, who sought unity with Indonesia in a ‘Melayu Raya’ or ‘Indonesia Raya’ – who gained leadership of this campaign, but rather the more conservative United Malays National Organisation (UMNO), a federation of organizations from the different sultanates or states in British Malaya. The whole position of the monarch began increasingly to be described as at best that of a “symbol” or “cement”, assisting to hold the ‘Malay race’ together. They were a complete contrast to the old kerajaan equation in which subjects were understood to be virtually embodied in ‘the raja’ – defined with reference to him, and living in accordance with the adat (custom) that was conceived as being ‘in his hands’. On the one hand, UMNO leaders tended to give the bangsa a Peninsular focus, and presented themselves as the defenders of its purity. In so doing, they distinguished themselves from their Malay Nationalist Party (MNP) opponents – Dr Burhanuddin al-Helmy and others who, like Ibrahim Yaacob earlier, stressed the cross-Archipelago ‘Melayu Raya’ idea and even expressed a willingness to make the Malay bangsa open to ‘Chinese’ and other immigrants. Having highlighted this distinction between an UMNO and an MNP approach, however, the UMNO leadership also seemed to have admitted and condoned real inclusiveness in their Peninsular-focused bangsa.

In 1961 Tunku Abdul Rahman led an attempt to expand the Malayan federation, hoping to incorporate Singapore, Crown Colony of Sarawak, North Borneo and Brunei – all the territories formerly under British administration of one form or another. This continued nation building had a distinctly ‘Malay’ aspect. The Malay phrase sometimes used to describe the new ‘Malaysia’ was ‘Melayu Raya’ (‘Greater Malaydom’), which had been used by the radical Malay leader Ibrahim Yaacob and others to refer to the far wider political scheme that would embrace all the territories in both the British and Dutch colonial spheres. In a sense the Tunku was hijacking the phrase for a narrower vision, but one in which the ‘Peninsular Malays’ (or, to be precise, those who had come to identify themselves as ‘Peninsular Malays’) would be Ketuanan Melayu. The establishing of Malaysia in 1963 was a victory for those advocating the ‘narrower’ Peninsular-focused ‘Malay’ bangsa – those who distinguished ‘Malays’ from ‘Javanese’, ‘Bugis’ and others (though at the same time tending to accept these people as recruits to ‘Malay’ identity).

To convince both these provinces to agree to join ‘Malaysia’, compromises were made by the Peninsula leaders to placate the ‘non-Malay’ peoples, suspicious of ‘Malay colonialism’. Among other matters, the English language would continue to be the official language; also, the indigenous people of the Borneo states would enjoy special privileges in Malaysia similar to those extended to their fellow bumiputra (‘sons of the soil’), the ‘Malays’. Despite these conciliatory moves, however, the Borneo ‘Malays’ were nevertheless joining a ‘Malay’-dominated state in which their Malay language was the national language, Islam was the official religion, and the national government would almost certainly promote a ‘Malay’ agenda. Dealing with the non-Muslim population of Sabah, the government has often enmeshed development initiatives with a promotion of both Islam and ‘Malayness’ with ‘development’ is used as an “entry point into local villages”, with the idea of a superior ‘Malay’ civilization being projected in both subtle and not so subtle ways. Brunei should perhaps have been the most enthusiastic about joining the ‘Malaysia’ project but Brunei did not join there was anxiety that the sultan would lose powers in the Malaysian structure, and Brunei now also had a huge oil wealth it wanted to protect and was further complicated by Azahari’s short-lived Brunei revolt of 1962 who had acquired something of the pan-Archipelago vision held by Ibrahim Yaacob and his supporters. When the British returned to Singapore after the war they did not intend to include Singapore in the new Malaya, and the ‘Malay’ leadership on the Peninsula had itself been anxious about the impact that so large a ‘Chinese’ community could have on the ‘ethnic balance’ of the new state. But there was also concern about leaving Singapore independent (especially considering the largely ‘Chinese’ communist movement on the Peninsula), and, after all, the inclusion of the Borneo territories was expected to counter to some extent the ‘Singapore-Chinese’ impact.

In Thailand the incorporation of the kerajaan polities, as we have seen, has been a long and sometimes unpleasant process – and, unlike the case of the British and Dutch, Thai colonial rule (as some in the ‘Malay’ community would describe it) has not been withdrawn. On the contrary, the Thais have at certain times engaged in a vigorous imposing of Thai culture. Opposition to Thai rule has not been unanimous. Also, there has been division among the groups that have campaigned against Thai rule – with one group seeking the restoration of the sultanates, a second stressing ‘Malayness’, and others again attempting to advance a more strongly religious agenda.

In late 1965, the failed 30 September Movement coup attempt caused Sukarno to fall from power and General Suharto to seize power in Indonesia. Because of this internal conflict, Indonesia lost its desire to continue its hostile policy against Malaysia, and therefore the war ended. On 28 May 1966, a conference held in Bangkok secured an agreement between the Federation of Malaysia and Republic of Indonesia to resolve the conflict. The violence ended in June, and the peace deal was signed on 11 August and officially recognised two days later. With this treaty, Indonesia and Malaysia officially agreed to be two separate national entities that mutually recognised each other's existence and sovereignty. It is worth noting also that despite the fact that their numbers were curtailed and ideology wounded by government repression, proponents of pan-unity with Indonesia persisted in pressuring the UMNO-led government to adopt more conciliatory approaches towards Indonesia. Moreover, the comments also highlighted an increasingly pertinent dimension to the kinship factor that was taking shape in this relationship: the need to reinforce Indo-Malay solidarity and identity in the face of the increasing political weight of their respective domestic Chinese constituencies. On 28 September 1966, Indonesia returned to being a member of the United Nations, which was followed by closer ties between Indonesia and Malaysia.

== Contemporary events ==
After the Indonesia-Malaysia peace deal, Indonesia was occupied with its own domestic problems building its economy while trying to maintain its unity as a diverse and plural nation. As a result, during the reign of Suharto, freedom and democracy were sacrificed in the name of national stability and unity. In 1975, Indonesia annexed the former Portuguese colony of East Timor that finally achieved independence from Indonesia in 1999. Indonesia suffered various problems ranging from economic crises, separatist movements in Aceh and West Papua, to the problem of terrorism. Indonesia is more interested in defining itself as Indonesian by trying to develop national character building, to define themselves as pluralist nation encapsulated in Bhinneka Tunggal Ika (i.e., unity in diversity) under Pancasila as a national ideology with territorial claim only spanning from Sabang in Aceh to Merauke in Papua. As the largest nation in Southeast Asia, Indonesia seems to be satisfied on channelling its regional ambition through assuming leadership role among ASEAN countries.

On the other side, Malaysia was struggling on national building and facing problems regarding the national format alternatives; between leftist republic fighters and rightist traditional royalists. The remnants of Kesatuan Melayu Muda — the advocate of unification with Indonesia, which had been fighting for the independence for Malaya, aspired for the formation of Greater Indonesia or Greater Malay, to join the republic and encourage to overthrow the monarchy. However, at that time the majority of Malays supported the traditional institution of the Malay rulers (Monarchies of Malaysia) and Islam as the national ideology; which led to the prominence of United Malays National Organisation (UMNO), which fought to uphold the traditional institution of the Malay rulers and the special status of Islam.

The national unity issues in Malaysia have also been aggravated with inter-racial tensions, especially between the Malay majority with Chinese and Indian minorities, the main problem that has influenced Malaysian politics up until now. The racial issue and the disagreement on citizenship and privilege issues between Bumiputra and Chinese and Indian Malaysians were the very problems that had caused the separation of Singapore from Malaysia back in the 1960s. By the end of the 1960s, UMNO gained domination in Malaysian politics, while their rival, the advocate of the republic and the union with Greater Indonesia, were stigmatised as leftists, communists or even traitors. In North Borneo, the Brunei royals chose not to follow Sarawak and Sabah in forming Malaysia and remained under British protection until 1984.

With both parties kept busy and being occupied in their own problems, taking their own path of national systems, the ideal of a grand union that united the whole so-called Malay race under one great national entity called Greater Malay or Greater Indonesia has finally faded away, ceased to exist and remain irredentist. However, the term "Indonesia Raya" is still in use today as the national anthem of Indonesia, written in 1924.

While Greater Indonesia as an irredentist political movement has mostly ceased to exist, the idea continues to live on in the psyche of the people. One modern manifestation is the promotion of the Malay language as an ASEAN language. In 2022, Ismail Sabri Yaakob, the Prime Minister of Malaysia, proposed the use of Bahasa Melayu as ASEAN’s second language. Ismail Sabri Yaakob said Malaysia and Indonesia will continue to make efforts to uplift the status of Bahasa Melayu, which may become an ASEAN language one day.

The Dewan Bahasa dan Pustaka (DBP) Board of Governors chairman, Dr. Awang Sariyan, remarked that the agreement reached by Malaysia and Indonesia to continue to work together to uplift the status of Bahasa Melayu will increase the chance of it being adopted as an ASEAN and international language, because Bahasa Melayu (which has about 300 million speakers) is also used in Indonesia, Brunei, Singapore, Thailand, the Philippines, Cambodia, Laos, Vietnam, Myanmar and Timor Leste, while efforts to make Bahasa Melayu as the official language of ASEAN required strong support from all Malay-speaking countries. Nadiem Anwar Makarim, the Minister of Education, Culture, Research, and Technology of Indonesia, remarked that he rejected the suggestion to strengthen Malay language as the ASEAN official language and intermediary language, [and suggested] the aspiration should be reviewed and discussed further at the regional level. Kornelius Purba, the editor of The Jakarta Post, commented that the Malaysian leader wanted to leave a quick legacy, the Minister Nadiem Makarim was blunter in rejecting idea, and could spark unnecessary suspicion from predominantly Buddhist nations such as Thailand, Vietnam, Cambodia, Laos, and Myanmar, or from the predominantly Catholic Philippines. Joanne Lin, a researcher in ISEAS-Yusof Ishak Institute, lamented that this idea will likely be viewed as another nationalistic endeavor by Kuala Lumpur or even Ismail Sabri himself to score points on the domestic front, but possibly erode efforts to preserve regional stability and order, and might open the way for a proliferation of similar requests to pour through the floodgates. Rohiman Haroon commented that the use of Malay language in archipelago will continue to grow and, whether the Indonesians like it or not, the language is a deeply rooted Bahasa Melayu. The case against the proposal are Malay is not widely spoken as claimed as Bahasa Indonesia (Indonesian) is the 10th most spoken language in the world, and not Bahasa Melayu—which could be a case of cultural appropriation. Some states, thus, might interpret the move as a form of political and cultural dominance. As Mandarin is currently more widely spoken and recognized at the global stage, ASEAN member states may also perceive this as a divisive agenda, and will question why their respective language cannot be the second language. Furthermore, concerns over additional operational cost to be incurred such as for translators and interpreters.

== See also ==
- Kesatuan Melayu Muda, political movement in Malaya fought for the unification with Indonesia
- Sang Saka Malaya, the Kesatuan Melayu Muda movement flag in Malaysia
- Maphilindo, another irredentist concept, including the Philippines
