= Kesatuan Melayu Muda =

1938–1945 Malayan left-wing nationalist organisation

Young Malays Union Kesatuan Melayu Muda كساتوان ملايو مودا
- Abbreviation: KMM
- Leader: Ibrahim Yaacob
- Founder: Ibrahim Yacoob and Ishak Haji Muhammad
- Founded: May 1937
- Dissolved: 1945
- Preceded by: Malay Youth League
- Succeeded by: Parti Kebangsaan Melayu Malaya
- Newspaper: Warta Malaya (Singapore)
- Paramilitary wing: Malayan Volunteer Army
- Ideology: Left-wing nationalism Malay irredentism Malay nationalism Socialism; Anti-imperialism; Tan Malaka Thought; Pro-Japanese imperialism (until June 1942)
- Political position: Left-wing
- Colours: Red, white

Party flag

Kesatuan Melayu Muda (KMM; Jawi: كساتوان ملايو مودا; lit. 'Young Malays Union' in Malay) was the first leftist and national political establishment in British Malaya. Founded by Ibrahim Yaacob and Ishak Haji Muhammad, KMM grew into a prominent pre-war nationalist movement, notable for its leftist political stance and willingness to use violence, a sharp break with their contemporaries in the Malay nationalist movement.

The KMM, however, commanded very little mass support. By 1945, it only enjoyed a membership of 60 and limited to a few cities. In addition, their radical anti-colonialism was anathema to British authorities which had Ibrahim and other KMM leaders arrested in 1942. After World War II, KMM members later founded Parti Kebangsaan Melayu Malaya, a predecessor to Parti Sosialis Rakyat Malaya, Parti Rakyat Malaysia and later, Parti Keadilan Rakyat.

== Foundation and development ==
Broadly speaking, the intellectual basis for what was to become developed both from external impetus from the spread of Indonesian nationalist ideas into Malaysia, and the development of an anti- colonialist intellectual climate within the Sultan Idris Training College for Malay Teachers. In 1927, Malay nationalism in British Malaya received intellectual impetus from their Indonesian cousins in the wake of the failed 1926 Communist uprising against the Dutch in the Dutch East Indies. Indonesian nationalist leaders, such as the Comintern agent Tan Malaka, sought refuge in Malaya in the wake of the crackdown that ensued, where they spread their radical anti-colonial ideology to Malaya. Tan Malaka also maintained contacts with Malay radicals and advised them on politics and mobilization. The name 'Kesatuan Melayu' was taken from the principles of Tan Malaka's 'Malay Unity' writings, which envisions for a free Malay archipelago and was then adopted by early Malay nationalists.

This was a significant development in Malay nationalism, given that the nationalism that had developed in Malaya, in contrast to the movements developing in the other British colonial possessions of India and Burma, remained relatively placid and moderate. Groups such as the Kesatuan Melayu Singapura, while advocating self- strengthening within the Malayan community, for instance by purchasing land for Malay reservations in 1928, or by pooling funds to send Malays to Oxford and Cambridge in order to ensure the continued preeminence of Malays in the administration of British Malaya, did not challenge British rule, and opted to collaborate with the British. In contrast, the ideology of the Indonesian nationalists was fundamentally radical and anti- colonialist. Pamphlets from the Partai Nasional Indonesia were spread locally, advocating non- compliance with the British and resistance to colonial rule. This Indonesian radicalism would later come to form the intellectual nucleus of the KMM.

The establishment of KMM was closely related to the burgeoning anti-colonialism at several educational institutions such as Sultan Idris Training College for Malay Teachers (SITC, currently known as Universiti Pendidikan Sultan Idris). Founding members of the KMM owed significant inspiration and intellectual influences to the anti- colonial intellectualism of such institutions- indeed, Ibrahim Yaacob himself was an alumnus of the college. Along with him, other alumni of the college that were active in KMM were Hassan Manan, Abdul Karim Rashid and Mohd. Isa Mahmud, which has led to the recognition of the SITC as a birthplace of Malay nationalism. Tan Malaka's earlier conception for a Kesatuan Melayu or Indonesia Raya influenced the development of Ibrahim Yaacob's ideology and conception of Melayu Raya. According to Historian Khairudin Aljunied, members of the KMM also rely from Tan Malaka's Massa Actie as a source of intellectual origin and was "read with much interest."

After the establishment of its main branch in Kuala Lumpur, Malay school teachers, most of whom had graduated from SITC continued to spread KMM's wings throughout Malaya.

== Activity ==
KMM and several other Malay organisations later organised a Malay Congress in August 1939 in Kuala Lumpur. The second congress was held in Singapore in December 1940 while the third meeting was planned in Ipoh in 1941. The third congress however never took place due to Japanese occupation.

During the eve of the Second World War, KMM, Ibrahim Yaacob and his colleagues actively encouraged anti-British sentiments. The Japanese also aided KMM and financed Ibrahim Yaacob's purchased of an influential Malay publication called Warta Malaya in Singapore. By 1941, the British began observing the activities of KMM as they perceived KMM as a radical left-wing association. By the end of the year, Ibrahim Yaacob, Ishak Muhammad and many other KMM leadership were arrested and imprisoned, leaving the KMM severely weakened.

During the Battle of Malaya, KMM was one of many organisations that aided the Japanese as they believed that Japanese would give Malaya independence. The KMM actively assisted the Japanese through fifth column activities. This pro-Japanese anti-British tendency made KMM very close to the Japanese force. All of KMM members that were imprisoned by the British earlier were released by the Japanese during the occupation. In January 1942, KMM requested the Japanese to grant Malaya the independence the Japanese had promised earlier. This was the first request for Malayan independence by a Malaya-wide political body. The request was turned down. Furthermore, the Japanese authorities were aware that KMM had links with the Malayan Communist Party and the Malayan Peoples' Anti-Japanese Army. These led to the disbandment of KMM and establishment of the Malayan Volunteer Army (マライ義勇軍, Marai Giyūgun) in its stead with Ibrahim Yaacob made the commander-in-chief with lieutenant-colonel rank. Despite the forced dissolution of KMM, Japan did not arrest its members because they needed to establish rapport with the Malays, which KMM members had provided. After the dissolution of the party by Japanese authorities, its membership continued their activities, but adopted a policy of covert opposition to Japanese imperialism from within, focusing on protecting Malay soldiers from the occupation.

With the surrender of Japan in August 1945, former KMM cadres formed the nucleus of the emerging political movements like the Parti Kebangsaan Melayu Malaya, Angkatan Pemuda Insaf, and Angkatan Wanita Sedar.

== Founding members ==
Name	Position	Education	Occupation	State of Origin
Ibrahim Yaakub	President	Malay Schools	School teacher then journalist	Pahang
Mustapha Hussain [ms]	Vice-President	Malay and English Schools	Lecturer	Perak
Hassan Manan [ms]	Secretary I	Malay Schools	Schoolteacher	Selangor
Othman Mohd Noor	Secretary II	Malay and English Schools	Typist	Kuala Lumpur
Idris Hakim	Treasurer	Malay and English Schools	Clerk	Perak
Ishak Muhammad	Central Committee Member	Malay and English Schools	Magistrate to Teacher to Journalist	Pahang
Abdul Karim Rashid [ms]	Central Committee Member	Malay Schools	Schoolteacher	Selangor
Bahar Abik	Central Committee Member	Malay Schools	Subordinate Officer	Kuala Lumpur
Onan Siraj	Central Committee Member	Malay and English Schools	Odd-job Worker	Perak
Sulung Chik	Central Committee Member	Malay and English Schools	Subordinate Officer	Pahang
Abdul Samad Ahmad	Central Committee Member	Malay Schools	Journalist	Selangor
Abdullah Kamil	Central Committee Member	Malay Schools	Journalist	Kuala Lumpur
Mohammad Salehuddin	Central Committee Member	Malay Schools	Journalist	Kuala Lumpur

== See also ==
- Parti Kebangsaan Melayu Malaya
