= Barbara Watson Andaya =

Australian historian and author

Barbara Watson Andaya (born 7 June 1943) is an Australian historian and author who studies Indonesia and Maritime Southeast Asia. She has also done extensive research on women's history in Southeast Asia, and of late, on the localization of Christianity in the region. She was a full professor in the Department of Asian Studies at the University of Hawaiʻi at Mānoa until her retirement and previously served as director of the UHM Center for Southeast Asian Studies. She was President of the American Association for Asian Studies from 2005 to 2006.

== Biography ==
Born on 7 June 1943, she received her Bachelor of Arts and Dip.Ed. from the University of Sydney. In 1966 she received an East-West Center grant to study for her Master of Arts in history at the Hawaiʻi. Subsequently, she went on to complete her Ph.D. in Southeast Asian history at Cornell University. She is married to Leonard Andaya, a historian and scholar of similar topics at the same university. Awarded a Guggenheim Award in 2000, it resulted in The Flaming Womb: Repositioning Women in Southeast Asian History, 1500–1800 (a Choice Academic Book of the Year in 2007).

== Publications ==
- Cambridge History of Early Modern Southeast Asia (Cambridge: Cambridge University Press, 2015), (with Leonard Andaya).
- The Flaming Womb: Repositioning Women in Early Modern Southeast Asia. Honolulu: University of Hawaiʻi Press. 2006. ISBN 978-0-8248-2955-1.
- A History of Malaysia, Second Edition (Macmillan: Basingstoke and London, 2001). (with Leonard Y. Andaya).
- Other Pasts: Women, Gender and History in Early Modern Southeast Asia (Honolulu: Center for Southeast Asia Studies, 2000).
- To Live as Brothers: Southeast Sumatra in the Seventeenth and Eighteenth Centuries (Honolulu: University of Hawaiʻi Press, 1993).
- Raja Ali Haji, The Precious Gift (Tuhfat al Nafis). An Annotated Translation (Oxford in Asia: Kuala Lumpur, 1982). (with Virginia Matheson).
- Perak, the Abode of Grace. A Study of an Eighteenth Century Malay State (Oxford in Asia: Kuala Lumpur, 1979).
