= Leonard Andaya =

American historian and professor

- Education: Yale University (BA); Cornell University (MA and PhD)
- Occupation: Professor

Leonard Andaya is an American professor of Southeast Asian History at University of Hawaii at Manoa. His concentration is in the modern history of Southeast Asia, particularly that of Malaysia, Indonesia, the southern Philippines, and southern Thailand.

Andaya received his BA in History from Yale University, and his MA and PhD in Southeast Asian history from Cornell University. He has also taught and held research positions at the University of Malaya, the Research School of Pacific (and Asian) Studies at the Australian National University, and Auckland University. He is married to Barbara Watson Andaya, a historian and scholar of similar topics at the same university.

== Publications ==
- The Kingdom of Johor (1975)
- The Heritage of Arung Palakka: History of South Sulawesi (Celebes) in the Seventeenth Century (1981)
- History of Malaysia (with Barbara Watson Andaya, 1982, revised edition, 2000)
- The World of Maluku: Eastern Indonesia in the Early Modern Period (1993)
- Leaves of the Same Tree: Trade and Ethnicity in the Straits of Melaka (2008)
- Cambridge History of Early Modern Southeast Asia (with Barbara Watson Andaya, 2015)
