= Ibrahim Yaacob =

Malaysian politician and nationalist (1911–1979)

Ibrahim bin Yaacob
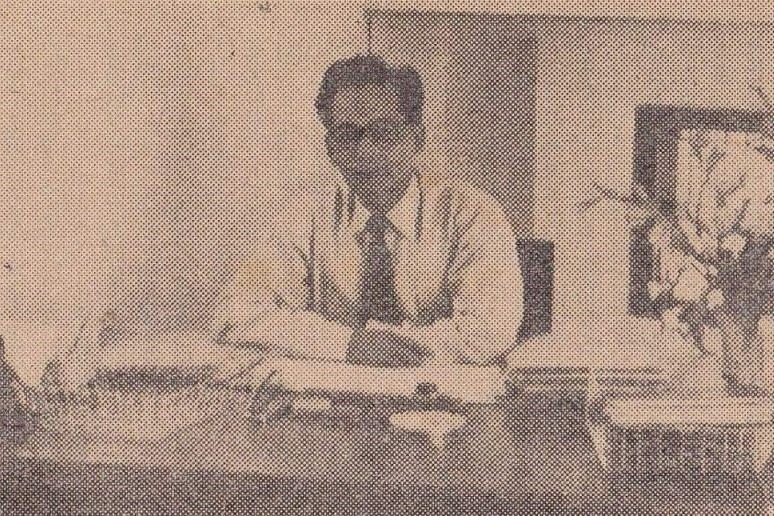
- Ibrahim bin Yaacob, leader of Kesatuan Melayu Muda (KMM)
- Born: 1911; Temerloh, Pahang, British Malaya
- Died: 8 March 1979; Jakarta, Indonesia
- Other name: Iskander Kamel Agastya
- Occupations: Politician, nationalist
- Known for: Founding and leading Kesatuan Melayu Muda (KMM)
- Political party: Kesatuan Melayu Muda; Murba Party
- Movement: Melayu Raya, Indonesia Raya

Ibrahim bin Yaacob (1911 – 8 March 1979) was a Malayan politician and nationalist. An opponent of the British colonial government, he was president and founder of Kesatuan Melayu Muda (KMM). During World War II, he supported the Japanese during their occupation of Malaya and led the Malayan Volunteer Army. Arrested by the British colonial government, the Japanese freed him in February 1942, and he went on to save hundreds of Malayan soldiers from being killed during the occupation; this later spared him from being arrested by Force 136 after the war. He died in Jakarta on 8 March 1979.

== Early life and education ==
Ibrahim was born in Temerloh, Pahang, to a family of Bugis descent. In 1929, he joined the Sultan Idris Teachers' Training College and graduated two years later as a teacher. Inspired from nationalist thoughts smuggled by Sukarno's Fikiran Ra'jat newspaper, Ibrahim would join Sukarno's Indonesian National Party (PNI). in 1932, he would instead join Tan Malaka's Indonesian Republic Party (PARI). Such was due to the influence of exiled communists such as Jamaluddin Tamin, Tan Malaka, Alimin, and others who are living in Malaya. During the 1930s, he wrote articles critical of British administration in Malay newspapers. After receiving a warning from colonial authorities, he resigned and became editor of the nationalist newspaper Majlis. In 1938, he founded the KMM.

== Political ideology and activism ==
Ibrahim envisioned the unification of Malaya and Indonesia under the concept of Melayu Raya, inspired by Sukarno's nationalist movement. The KMM rejected feudal leadership, advocating progressive, secular nationalism aimed at uniting Malays beyond provincial and ethnic divisions.

In 1940, as President of the KMM, Ibrahim embarked on a journey across the Malay Peninsula to observe the socio-economic conditions of the Malay people and to promote nationalist unity under the vision of Melayu Raya, advocating for the unification of Malaya and Indonesia. Throughout his travels, he documented widespread poverty among Malays, criticized British colonial policies that favored foreign capital and labor, and highlighted the lack of effective leadership due to lingering feudal mindsets. His writings called for organized political consciousness and modern leadership to resist colonial oppression and reclaim Malay rights. In late 1941, his nationalist activities led to his arrest by British authorities, during which part of his manuscript for Melihat Tanah Air was confiscated, marking him as one of Malaya's earliest political detainees.

He was fond of the beliefs of Tan Malaka's form of Malay Nationalism and once listed the KMM as part of the Tan Malaka aligned Persatuan Perjuangan ggrouping during the Indonesian National Revolution, though he would explain that it would be officially delisted for the matters of diplomacy.

== Collaboration with Japan during World War II ==
As KMM leader, Ibrahim sought Japanese support to achieve independence, engaging in covert cooperation with Japanese intelligence before the invasion of Malaya. The goal of KMM was to achieve independence for Malaya through union with Indonesia. He accepted funds to acquire Warta Malaya as a propaganda tool, though he remained wary of Japanese intentions. He welcomed and worked with Japanese as he believed that Japanese would aid Malaya in gaining independence and support its fifth column activities.

Following his release in 1942, Ibrahim reorganized KMM efforts through the formation of the Barisan Pemuda, a youth corps that assisted Japanese forces while protecting Malay civilians and soldiers. By mid-1942, the Japanese banned the KMM, viewing its nationalist ambitions as a threat. Ibrahim shifted to underground activities and reconnected with anti-Japanese groups, including the Malayan Communist Party.

== Later life and death ==
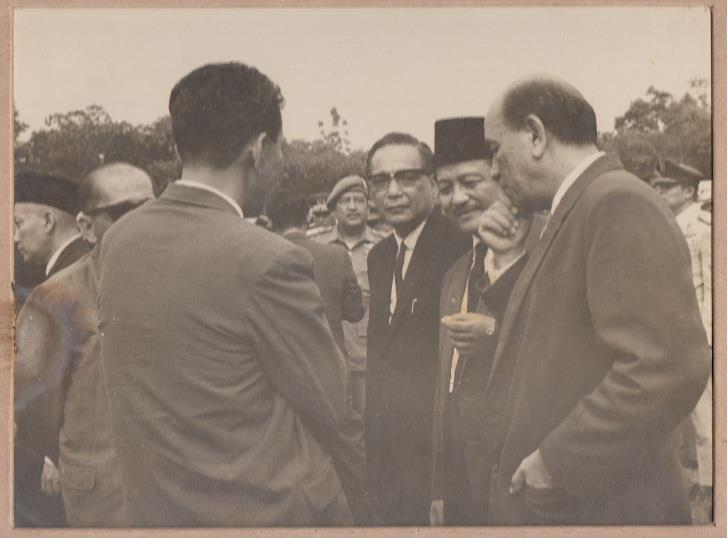
Ibrahim Yaacob and Sukarni, then head of the Murba Party in Indonesia (c. 1971).

After World War II, Ibrahim avoided prosecution due to his role in protecting Malay soldiers during the occupation. He lived in Indonesia under the name Iskander Kamel Agastya, continuing to advocate for Malay-Indonesian unity until he died in Jakarta on 8 March 1979. During his time in Indonesia, he joined the Murba Party and contested in the 1971 Indonesian legislative election in East Java.

== Places named after him ==
Several places were named after him, including:

- SMK Dato' Ibrahim Yaacob, a secondary school in Kuala Lumpur
- Kolej Ibrahim Yaakub, a residential college at Universiti Kebangsaan Malaysia, Bangi, Selangor
