= E. E. C. Thuraisingham =

Malaysian politician

Yang Berhormat Dato' Sir E. E. C. Thuraisingham DPMJ CBE JP
- இ. இ. சி. துரைசிங்கம்

Chairman of the Communities Liaison Committee of British Malaya
- In office 1949–1955
- Preceded by: Position established
- Succeeded by: Position abolished

Member Minister of Education for the Federation of Malaya
- In office 1951–1955
- Preceded by: Position established
- Succeeded by: Position abolished

Personal details
- Born: Ernest Emmanuel Clough Thuraisingham; 28 August 1898 Taiping, Perak, Federated Malay States, British Malaya (now Malaysia)
- Died: 30 March 1979 (aged 81)
- Spouses: Ethel Mary Huggins; (1920–1925); Pearl Sayampanathan; (1929–1947); Thayamany Muthuvelu; (present)
- Education: University of Cambridge
- Occupation: Member Minister of Education for the Federation of Malaya
- Profession: Lawyer

Dato' Sir Ernest Emmanuel Clough Thuraisingham or E. E. C. Thuraisingham (Tamil: இ. இ. சி. துரைசிங்கம்) (28 August 1898 – 30 March 1979) was the first local Member (Minister) for Education in the Communities Liaison Committee (CLC) formed to build communal fraternity in British-ruled Malaya, from 1951–1955. He is also the first Asian chairman of the Selangor Turf Club.

== Early life ==
Thuraisingham was born in Taiping, Perak on 28 August 1898. He was the second son and child among six children of Kasinathar and Meenachi Clough.

After graduating on 19 December 1922 with a BA degree in Law & Political Economy at Cambridge University, Thuraisingham studied and did his pupillage at Middle Temple in the Inns of Court in London and became a Barrister-at-Law in 1924. Thuraisingham played soccer, tennis and hockey at Cambridge and later played soccer semi-professionally with the Tylehurst-on-Thames Soccer Team in the Berkshire Soccer League.

Urged by his father, Kasinathar Clough, Thuraisingham set up a legal practice in Singapore in 1925. He practised law in a partnership with M.V. Pillai and Charles Peng Siong Wong, another Cambridge lawyer. Being so close to Johore meant that he could also manage his father's large rubber estate in Skudai across the causeway as his parents and siblings had moved back to Jaffna in Sri Lanka by then.

== Family life ==
While at Cambridge, Thuraisingham married Ethel Mary Huggins in December 1920 and they had twin girls, Rani and Joan. It was difficult for a Ceylonese Barrister to practise law in England at that time and, if they returned, difficult for an English woman married to a Ceylonese lawyer in Colonial Malaya. And so they reluctantly parted, Thuraisingham returning to Malaya in 1925.

Later Thuraisingham married Pearl Sayampanathan, a teacher at St. Mary's School for Girls, Kuala Lumpur. He met her at a friend's house in Singapore in 1929. With the imminent Japanese occupation of Singapore, Thuraisingham moved with Pearl to Kuala Lumpur in 1942 and set up home at 7B Treacher Road. He had three children with Pearl – Balendra, Patmalar and Thevendra. Pearl died in 1947 when she had a severe asthma attack and was unable to get timely medical help. This happened at a time when the politics of race was complicating the vision of Dato Onn Jaafar for an independent multiracial Malaya. Thuraisingham managed to juggle family life with the many demands of his political endeavours and legal career.

Sometime later Thuraisingham married Thayamany Muthuvelu, a widow with a daughter Gowri, and between them they had three children – Raja, Chandramani and Meenachi. Together they raised seven children in a house often filled with visiting relatives, friends and political allies.

Datin Lady Thayamany Thuraisingham was a devoted wife to Dato Thuraisingham. She also nursed him during his ailing years at their home in Bukit Travers.

== Hobbies and friends ==
Thuraisingham loved horse riding and horse racing. He owned a stable of race horses.

Sporting Gesture the First won the Selangor Turf Club (STC) Class 1 Division 1 Gold Vase in 1952. Another horse, aptly named Commotion, often created havoc before the gates were opened and ran like the thunder to win the mile (circa 1959) at the STC. Yet another horse, Bowdler, broke the 6-furlong sprint record at the STC (circa 1960) which remained unbroken for several years.

His love for horse riding and for horse racing was shared by the Sultan of Johor; together they owned a Class 1 stallion, Heroden, winner of several cups in the 1930s. This alliance led Thuraisingham to Onn Jaafar with whom he forged a close friendship that culminated in a political camaraderie that lasted over three decades. His camaraderie with Dato Onn strengthened with the Japanese occupation of mainland Malaya fuelling their common desire for Malayan independence.

Dato Onn was also a frequent visitor to Thuraisingham's house. Dato Onn's favourite posture was sitting with both his feet off the ground folded together on the armchair and drinking tea from the saucer while discussing political strategy with Thuraisingham in the piano room at the Treacher Road house. While together at the house, both loved to be casual often wearing the sarong.

== Professional life ==
For many years Thuraisingham's law office was above a general store at 71 Ampang Street before he moved (in 1968) to the Kwong Yik Bank Building nearby. Ampang Street (now Lebuh Ampang) was the business and retail center of the Malaysian Indian and Ceylonese community in downtown Kuala Lumpur. Among his clientele were rich Malaysian Chinese businessmen whose trust he won which also enabled him to provide pro-bono (free) legal services to those who could not pay. His office was adorned with thank you plaques from his Chinese clients dating over three decades. For a time one of his partners was Senator Athi Nahappan, a well-respected younger member of the Indian community.

== Political career ==
In May 1946, Dato Onn Jaafar became the first leader of the United Malays National Organisation (UMNO). Onn, Thuraisingham and several others, including Henry H.S. Lee and V.M.N. Menon, became the vanguard of the multiracial Malayan independence movement. In response to this movement and the spectre of the UN anti-colonial stance, the British instituted self-government and Onn became Member (Minister) of Home Affairs while Dato Thuraisingham became Member (Minister) of Education.

As the first Member of Education in the Federation of Malaya, Thuraisingham established a comprehensive system of education beginning in 1951 to provide free education for all children between six and twelve years old; thus implementing the recommendations of the Barnes and Fenn Reports he presented to the Federal Legislative Council on 19 September 1951.

He stated:

The Barnes and Fenn Reports are before you and I trust that all of you have read them. The one single factor that emerges from these two reports is the urgency with which all our education must be modelled to create a singleness in our plural society and build on it a powerful Malayan nation. The comradeship among children of all races from a multi-racial school which ripens into friendship in adult years is of inestimable value for knitting together the different races.

Implementing the Barnes and Fenn Reports meant that more teachers were needed and so he established a teachers' training college in Kota Bharu and also leased teachers' training facilities at Kirkby and Brinsford Lodge in England. He also had more schools built, especially in rural areas.

In addition, Thuraisingham was one of the prime movers of the Social Welfare Lotteries System which financed the provision of welfare services to the poor of all races in Malaya.

=== Political Opposition ===
The two friends, Onn Jaafar and Thuraisingham, were firm believers of multiracialism in politics. Together they laid the ground-work for an independence movement to devolve power from the British. However, their egalitarian multiracial movement began losing ground to racial-based politics in the early 1950s to Malay anxieties. This racial-based movement was led by Tunku Abdul Rahman, who had entered national politics in 1951, pushing for a wholly Malay-based UMNO party but in allied with the Chinese-based (MCA) and Indian-based (MIC) parties which would become an election-winning strategy.

Thuraisingham worried about the growing wedge between Onn and Abdul Rahman, arranged for a meeting at his home in Treacher Road (now Jalan Sultan Ismail) for both men to settle their differences. The meeting, which took place in the piano room, lasted almost the whole day with the two unable to come to an agreement. A second meeting was arranged and that too failed.

Disappointed with the racial slant in Malayan politics, Thuraisingham resigned as Member for Education in 1955.

His wife Datin Thayamany said in an interview to New Sunday Times (31 December 2006):

On the way back from a visit to a teachers' training college in Kota Bharu, he came straight to me and told me he wanted to resign and return to his law practice and social work. I thought he had worked hard enough and since he wanted to practice again, I supported him.

== Contributions ==
Thuraisingham, the first leader of the Ceylon Federation of Malaya, a political party representing the small Tamil community from Sri Lanka, was appointed a senator in 1957, retiring in 1974 due to ill health.

Despite his failing health, he continued as Chairman of Malaysian Association for the Prevention of Tuberculosis (MAPTB) until his death at age 80, as he took the challenges of tuberculosis prevention seriously. The TB Diagnostic Clinic in Setapak is named after Dato Thuraisingham.

=== Selangor Turf Club ===
Of the many committees Thuraisingham served on, he especially enjoyed being Chairman of the Selangor Turf Club on Jalan Ampang, a popular position he held for over 20 years overseeing the massive development of the turf club from a small colonial racing club to one that many Malaysians were proud to participate in.

Thuraisingham's leadership brought many momentous changes, as he nurtured the Club's transition from a European concern to a local one. Among these changes were the construction of labourers' quarters, improvements to the stables and an increased level of concern for the well-being of the club's staff.

It was also during Thuraisingham's tenure that radio broadcasts of race proceedings began in Malaya. This was in 1954.

Two years later, Thuraisingham successfully replaced the Club's old attap shed with a $1mil grandstand. Built to accommodate the growing number of race fans, the new grandstand was declared open by the Prime Minister of Malaya, Tunku Abdul Rahman, on 3 April 1956. This development helped to further improve the club's growing reputation for being an exceptional and professional facility.

The club's progress faced a slight hiccup in 1957 when the "Great Floods" hit Kuala Lumpur. Water-logged roads made it difficult for outstation horses to reach the club by land, but the club surmounted the problem by arranging to have the horses brought in by ferries. Despite the fact that the grandstand was under less than three inches of water, the foreign riders refused to co-operate. Thuraisingam decided to rope in the entire team of track riders and riding boys to carry on with the races instead.

== Awards and recognition ==
- Thuraisingham received a CBE from King George VI in 1948.
- In 1950 the Sultan Ibrahim of Johore bestowed the title of Dato Paduka Makota Johore ("DPMJ") on Thuraisingham.
- He received the Doctor of Laws (Honoris Causa) from the National University of Singapore in 1953.
- Thuraisingham was knighted by Queen Elizabeth II on 10 July 1955 for his services to the country and Malayan education and bestowed the title of Knight Bachelor.

== Death ==
Clough Thuraisingham died in the early hours of the morning of 30 March 1979.
