= Malay Indonesians =

Ethnic group in Indonesia

Indonesian Malays
Orang Melayu Indonesia ملايو ايندونيسيا
- Malay tricolour

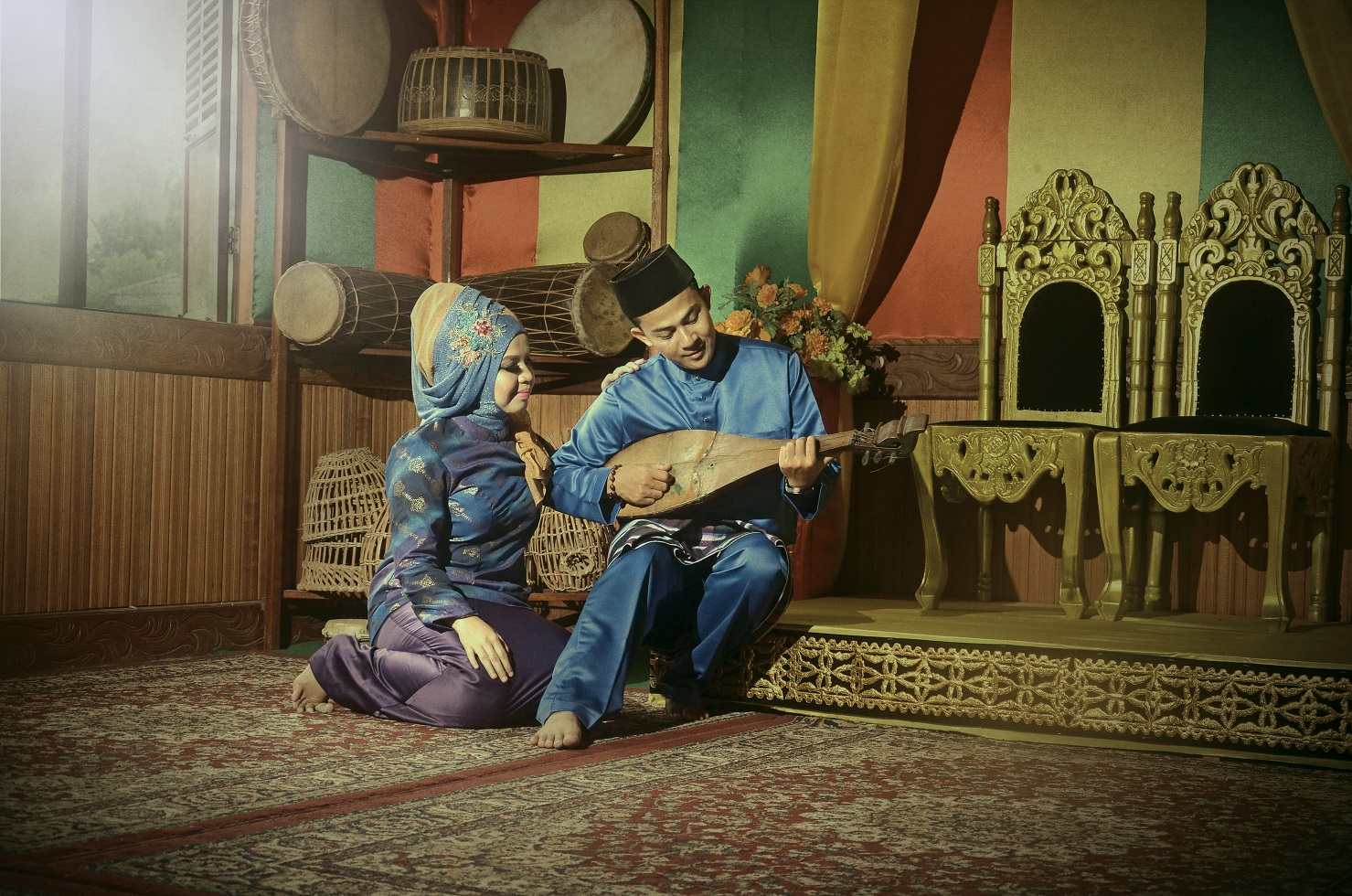
- A Riau Malay couple enjoying the traditional Gambus. The background panel incorporates the palettes of the Malay tricolour.

Total population
- 8,753,791 (2010) (Note: The figure is based on the ethnic classification presented in Ananta et al. 2015, which includes figures for every groups with "Malay" in their names as well as Jambi, Bengkulu, Serawai, Semendo peoples, but excludes figures for Palembang, Bangka, and Belitung peoples.)

Regions with significant populations
- Indonesia: 8,753,791 (2010)
- South Sumatra: 3,139,000
- Riau: 2,880,240
- West Kalimantan: 1,259,890
- Bangka Belitung: 936,000
- Jambi: 914,660
- Riau Islands: 600,108
- North Sumatra: 582,100
- Lampung: 269,240
- West Java: 190,224
- Jakarta: 165,039
- Bengkulu: 125,120
- Central Kalimantan: 87,222
- East Kalimantan: 84,468
- North Kalimantan: 64,881

Languages
- Native; Malay (numerous vernacular varieties); Also; Indonesian standard i.e. based on the Riau dialect

Religion
- Predominantly; Sunni Islam (98.77%); Minorities; Christians (Protestant and Roman Catholic) (0,98%) • Vajrayana Buddhist (0,22%) • Confucianism (0.014%) • Hindu (0.011%) • Other (0.003%)

Related ethnic groups
- Austronesian peoples; Malaysian Malays; Malay Singaporeans; Bruneian Malays; Minangkabau; Acehnese; Banjarese; Betawi; Thai Malays

Indonesian Malays (Malay/Indonesian: Orang Melayu Indonesia; Jawi: اورڠ ملايو ايندونيسيا) are ethnic Malays living throughout Indonesia. They are one of the indigenous peoples of the country. Indonesian, the national language of Indonesia, is a standardized form of Riau Malay. There were numerous kingdoms associated with the Indonesian Malays along with other ethnicities in what is now Indonesia, mainly on the islands of Borneo and Sumatra. These included Srivijaya, the Melayu Kingdom, Dharmasraya, the Sultanate of Deli, the Sultanate of Siak Sri Indrapura, the Riau-Lingga Sultanate, the Sultanate of Bulungan, Pontianak Sultanate, and the Sultanate of Sambas. The 2010 census states that there are 8 million Malays in Indonesia; this number comes from the classification of Malays in East Sumatra and the coast of Kalimantan which is recognized by the Indonesian government. This classification is different from the Malaysia and Singapore census which classify Malays as a broader racial category, which aside from the core ethnic Malays also includes all Muslim ethnic groups from the Indonesian archipelago (inc. Acehnese, Banjarese, Bugis, Mandailing, Minangkabau and Javanese) as Malays.

== History ==
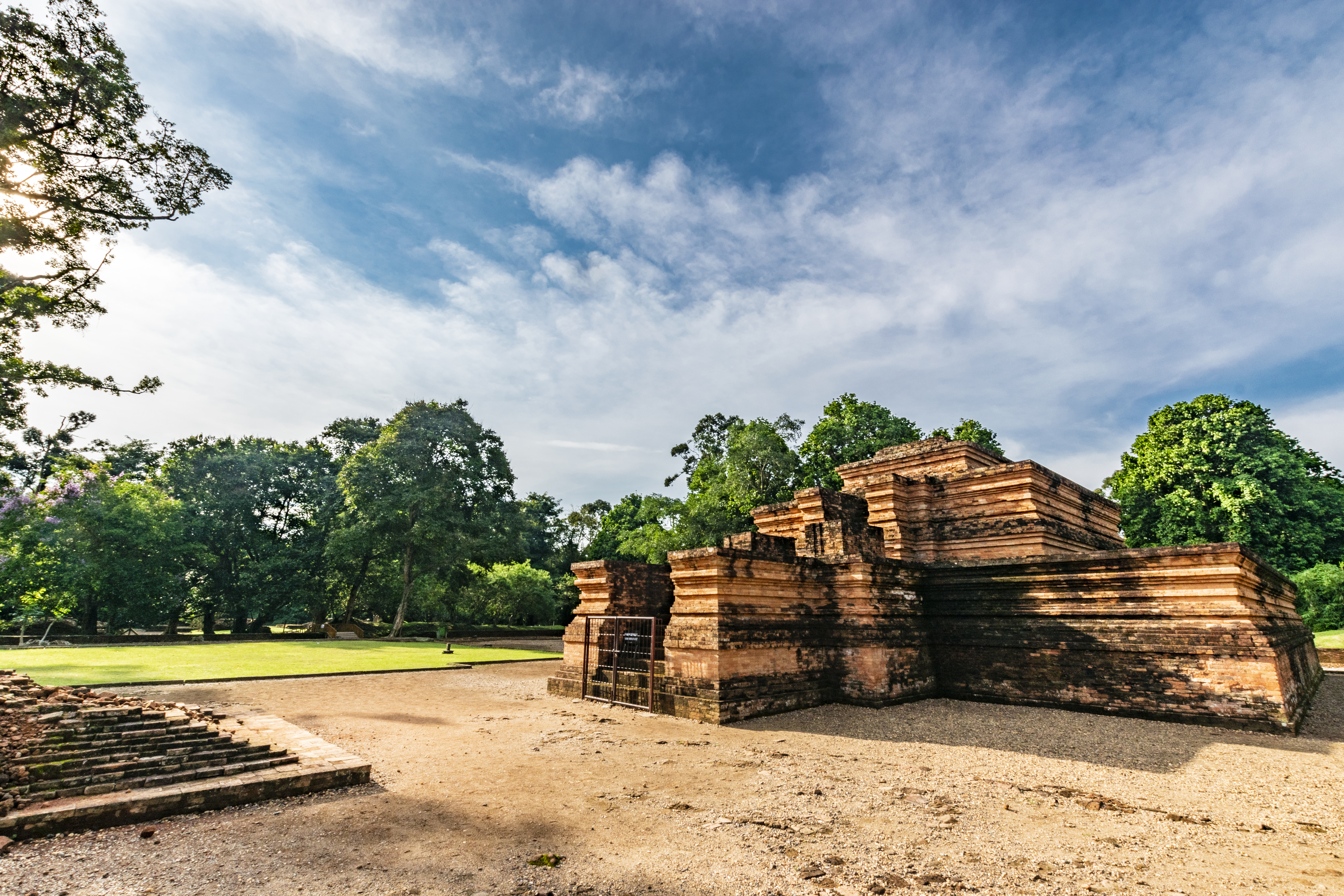
Muaro Jambi Temple Compounds located in Kampar Regency, Indonesia, is a proof of civilization heritage Melayu Kingdom (a kingdom centered in eastern Sumatra which is the origin of the formation of the Malays).

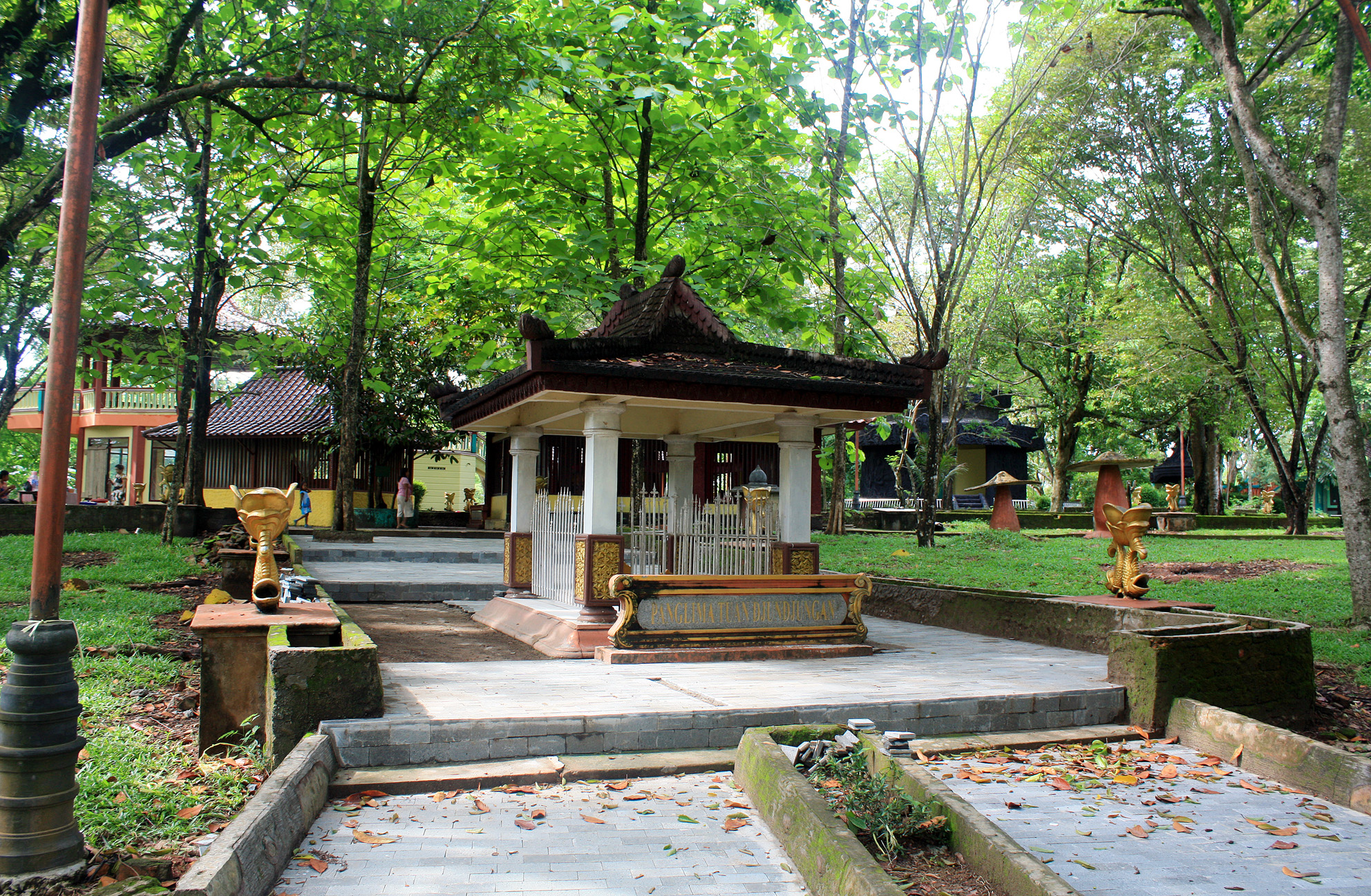
Bukit Seguntang in Palembang. According to Sejarah Melayu, the hill recorded the advent of Sang Sapurba, a legendary progenitor for various Malay royal houses in Sumatra, Malay Peninsula and Borneo.

Malay civilization, which is the precursor of the Malay ethnic group scattered along the east coast of Sumatra, Singapore, the Malay Peninsula, and the coast of Kalimantan. The epic literature, the Malay Annals, associates the etymological origin of "Melayu" to a small river named Sungai Melayu ('Melayu river') in Sumatra. The epic incorrectly stated that the river flowed to the Musi River in Palembang, while in reality it flowed to the Batang Hari River in Jambi. The term is thought to be derived from the Malay word melaju, a combination of the verbal prefix 'me' and the root word 'laju', meaning "to accelerate", used to describe the accelerating strong current of the river.

The beginning of the Common Era saw the rise of Malay states in the coastal areas of the Sumatra and Malay Peninsula; Srivijaya, Nakhon Si Thammarat Kingdom, Gangga Negara, Langkasuka, Kedah, Pahang, the Melayu Kingdom and Chi Tu. Between the 7th and 13th centuries, many of these small, often prosperous peninsula and Sumatran maritime trading states, became part of the mandala of Srivijaya, a great confederation of city-states centred in Palembang.

Srivijaya's influence spread over all the coastal areas of Sumatra and the Malay Peninsula, western Java and western Borneo, as well as the rest of the Malay Archipelago. Enjoying both Indian and Chinese patronage, its wealth was gained mostly through trade. At its height, the Old Malay language was used as its official language and became the lingua franca of the region, replacing Sanskrit, the language of Hinduism.

The glory of Srivijaya however began to wane after the series of raids by the Tamil Chola dynasty in the 11th century. After the fall of Srivijaya in 1025 CE, the Malayu kingdom of Jambi, Sumatra, became the most dominant Malay state of the region. By the end of the 13th century, the remnants of the Malay empire in Sumatra was finally destroyed by the Javanese invaders during the Pamalayu expedition (Pamalayu means "war against the Malays").

In 1299, through the support of the loyal servants of the empire, the Orang laut, a prince of Palembang origin, Sang Nila Utama established the Kingdom of Singapura in Temasek. His dynasty ruled the island kingdom until the end of the 14th century, when the polity once again faced the wrath of Javanese invaders. In 1400, his great-great-grandson, Parameswara, headed north and established the Malacca Sultanate. The new kingdom succeeded Srivijaya and inherited much of the royal and cultural traditions, including a large part of the territories of its predecessor.

The timeline of Srivijayan expansion from Palembang between the 7th–13th century; the state would subsequently be known as Melayu Kingdom before its demise. By the 14th century, a Palembangese-born prince, Parameswara, would later establish the Kingdom of Malacca, bringing the old Palembangese courts traditions and identity into the newfound state.

By the 15th century, the Malacca Sultanate, whose hegemony reached over much of the western Malay Archipelago, had become the centre of Islamisation in the east. As a Malaccan state religion, Islam brought many great transformation into the Malaccan society and culture, and It became the primary instrument in the evolution of a common Malay identity. The Malaccan era witnessed the close association of Islam with Malay society and how it developed into a definitive marker of Malay identity. Over time, this common Malay cultural idiom came to characterise much of the Malay Archipelago through the Malayisation process. The expansion of Malaccan influence through trade and Dawah brought with it together the Classical Malay language, the Islamic faith, and the Malay Muslim culture; the three core values of Kemelayuan ("Malayness"). the course of history, the term "Malay" has been extended to other ethnic groups within the "Malay world"; this usage is nowadays largely confined to Brunei, Malaysia and Singapore, where descendants of immigrants from these ethnic group are termed as anak dagang ("traders") and who are predominantly from the Indonesian archipelago.

Contrary to Brunei, Malaysia, and Singapore, Malayness has no special position in Indonesian state ideology, except as one of the constituent regional cultures — which tend to be represented on a province-by-province basis. Loyalty for a certain ethnic group was overshadowed with the new inter-ethnic loyalty, advocating the importance of the national unity and national identity of Bangsa Indonesia ("Indonesian nation") instead. Ethnic Malay is only recognised as one of myriad Indonesian ethnic groups, which enjoy equal status with other Indonesians such as Javanese, Sundanese, Minangkabau, Dayak, Buginese, Ambonese and Papuan.

=== Sumatra ===
There are various kingdoms and sultanates related to the history of the Malay people and other ethnicities on the island of Sumatra, such as Melayu Kingdom, Srivijaya, Dharmasraya, Sultanate of Deli, Sultanate of Siak Sri Indrapura, Asahan Sultanate, Riau-Lingga Sultanate, Riau Sultanate, Palembang Sultanate and the Lingga Sultanate, etc.

=== Kalimantan ===
There are various kingdoms and sultanates related to the history of the Malay people and other ethnicities on the island of Kalimantan (a.k.a. Borneo), such as Sanggau Kingdom, Pontianak Sultanate, Bulungan Sultanate, Berau Sultanate, Gunung Tabur Sultanate, Sambaliung Sultanate, Paser Sultanate, Kutai Sultanate, etc.

In the Pontianak incidents during the Japanese occupation of the Dutch East Indies, the Japanese massacred most of the Malay elite and beheaded all of the Malay Sultans in Kalimantan.

During the Fall of Suharto, there was a resurgence in Malay nationalism and identity in Kalimantan and ethnic Malays and Dayaks in Sambas massacred Madurese during the Sambas riots.

== Languages ==
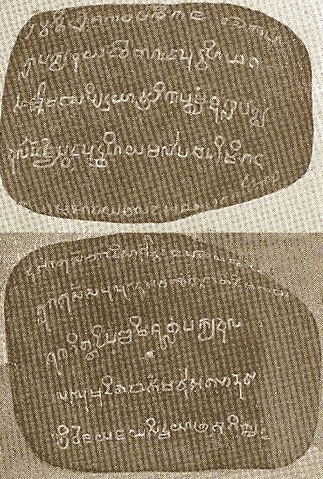
Kedukan Bukit Inscription (683), found in Palembang, Sumatra, Indonesia is the oldest surviving specimen of the Malay language.

Sumatra is the homeland of the Malay languages, which today spans all corners of Southeast Asia. The Indonesian language, which is the country's official language and lingua franca, was based on Riau Malay, which despite its common name is not based on the vernacular Malay dialects of the Riau Islands, rather it represents a form of Classical Malay as used in the 19th and early 20th centuries in the Riau-Lingga Sultanate. The Malay language has a long history, which has a literary record as far back as the 7th century AD. A famous early Malay inscription, the Kedukan Bukit Inscription, was discovered by the Dutchman M. Batenburg on 29 November 1920, at Kedukan Bukit, South Sumatra, on the banks of the Tatang river, a tributary of the Musi River. It is a small stone of 45 by 80 cm. It is written in Old Malay, a possible ancestor of today's Malay language and its variants. Most Malay languages and dialects spoken in Indonesia are mutually unintelligible with Standard Indonesian. The most widely spoken are Palembang Malay (3.2 million), Jambi Malay (1 million), Bengkulu Malay (1.6 million) and Banjarese (4 million) (although not considered to be a dialect of Malay by its speakers; its minor dialect is typically called Bukit Malay). Speakers of unintelligible Malay dialects speak standard Indonesian as a lingua franca. Besides the proper Malay languages, there are several languages closely related to Malay such as Minangkabau, Kerinci, Kubu and others. These languages are closely related to Malay, but their speakers do not consider their languages to be Malay. There are many Malay-based creoles spoken in the country especially in eastern Indonesia due to contacts from the western part of Indonesia and during colonial rule where Malay replaced Dutch as a lingua franca. The most well-known Malay creoles in Indonesia are Ambonese Malay, Betawi, Manado Malay and Papuan Malay.

== Sub-ethnic groups of Indonesian Malays ==
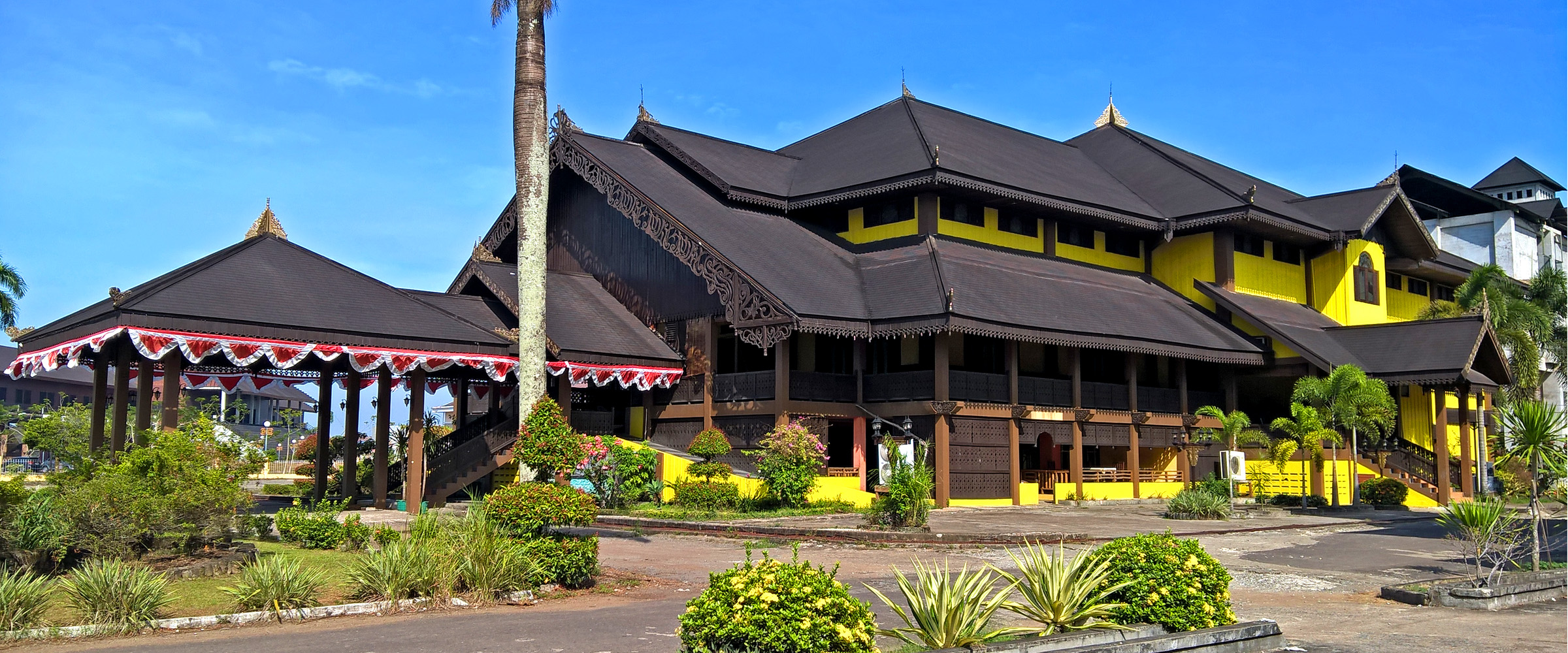
A Malay house in West Kalimantan

=== Malay ethnic groups in Indonesia ===
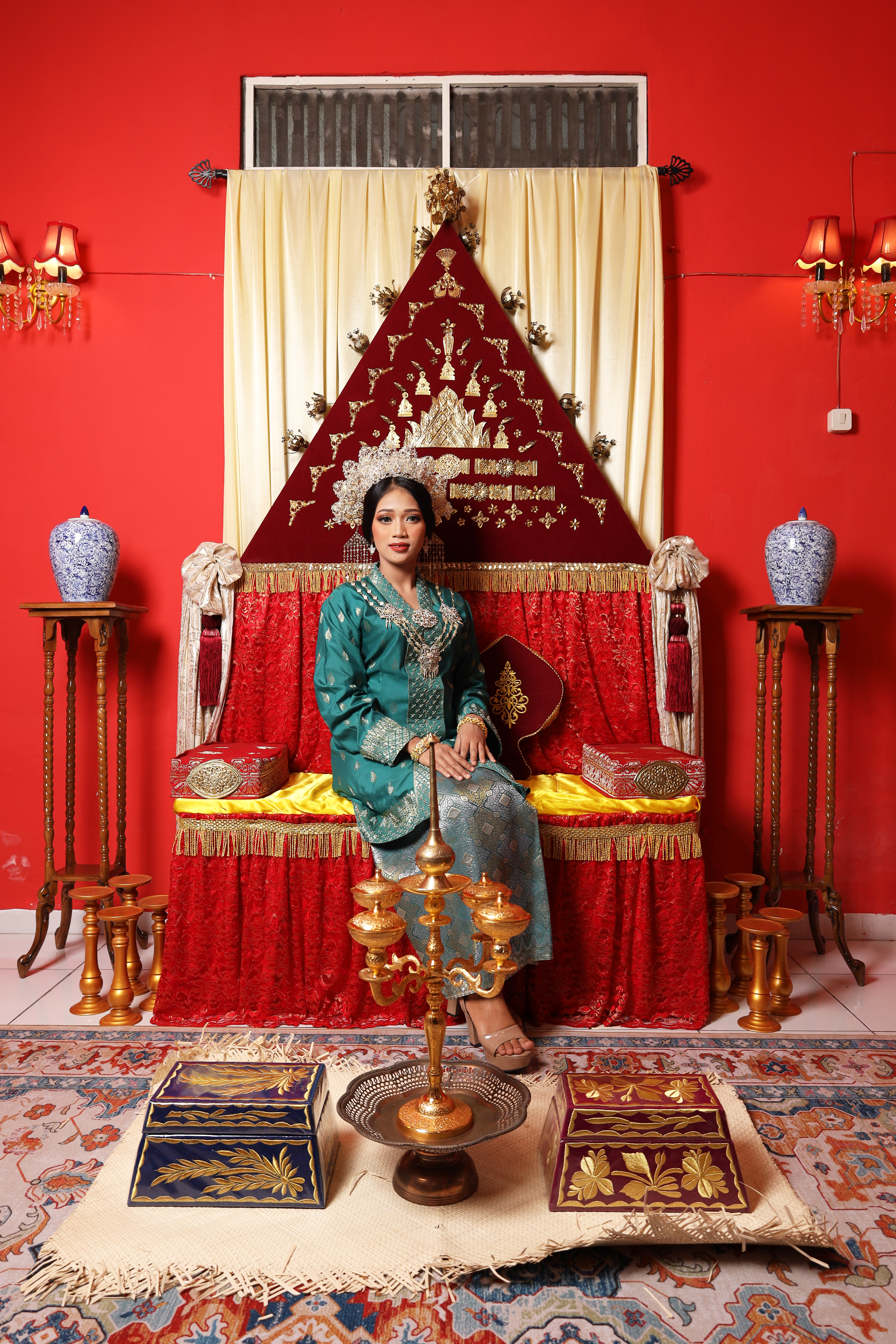
A Delinese Malay woman in the traditional wedding costume from North Sumatera, Indonesia

The Malay people in Indonesia fall into various sub-ethnicities with each having its own distinct linguistic variety, history, clothing, traditions, and a sense of common identity. According to Ananta et al. 2015, Malay Indonesians include:

==== Sumatra ====
- Langkat Malays
- Deli Malays
- Asahan Malays
- Riau Malays
  - Siak Malays
  - Rempang Malays
- Jambi Malays
- Palembang Malays
- Banyuasin Malays
- Lahat Malays
  - Lematang people
  - Kikim people
  - Pasemah people
    - Gumai people
    - Kisam people
    - Serawai people
    - Semendo people
    - Semidang people
  - Lintang people
- Bengkulu Malays

==== Kalimantan ====
- Kayong Malays
- Kotawaringin Malays
- Kutai Malays
- Pontianak Malays
- Sambas Malays

==== Bali and Lesser Sunda Islands ====
- Ampenan Malays
- Loloan Malays

==== Sulawesi ====
- Tawaeli Malays

==== Aboriginal Malays ====
- Akit
- Anak Rawa
- Batin
- Bonai
- Lom
- Orang Darat
- Orang Laut
- Orang Rimba
- Petalangan
- Talang Mamak
- Sekak

== Notable Indonesian Malays ==
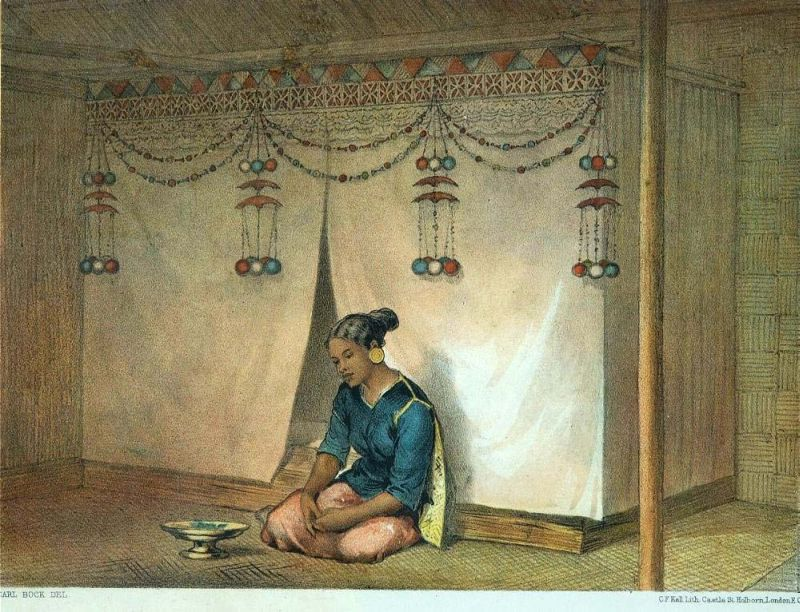
A Kutainese Malay lady in Residency of South and East Kalimantan, Dutch East Indies. Lithography to an original watercolour c. 1879–1880.

=== Literature ===
- Abdullah al-Misri, writer
- Andrea Hirata, Indonesian author
- Denny Januar Ali, writer and political consultant
- Raja Ali Haji, a 19th-century historian, member of the royal house of Riau-Lingga and Selangor and National Hero of Indonesia
- Tere Liye, Indonesian author
- Arifin C. Noer, Poet and film producer
- Sutardji Calzoum Bachri, Indonesian poet
- Hamzah Fansuri, 16th-century Sufi writer

=== Royalty ===
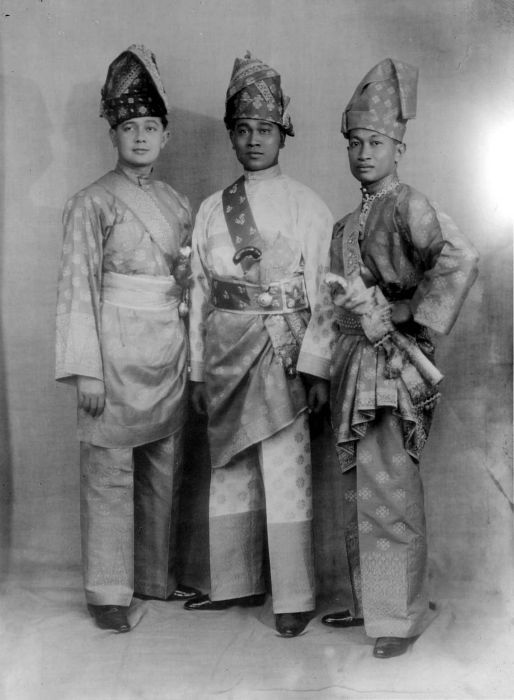
Malay princes of East Sumatra from the Royal Houses of Deli, Langkat and Serdang

- Jayanegara – Second monarch of the Majapahit Empire
- Mahmud Badaruddin II – 8th Sultan of the Palembang Sultanate
- Tuanku Sultan Otteman II – a former Sultan of Deli, in which the kingdom's capital was Medan, in North Sumatra.
- Sultan Ma'mun Al Rashid Perkasa Alamyah – 9th Sultan of Deli Sultanate
- Sultan Hamid II – former Sultan of the Pontianak Sultanate
- Tengku Ampuan Rahimah – Tengku Ampuan of Selangor (born in Indonesia)
- Pangeran Ratu Winata Kusuma of Sambas – heir to the Sultanate of Sambas
- Sultan Syarif Kasim II – 12th Sultan of Siak Sultanate

=== Politics ===
- Amir Sjarifuddin – politician and journalist, second prime minister of Indonesia
- Marzuki Alie – speaker of the People's Representative Council, 2009–2014 term
- Hatta Rajasa – the Coordinating Minister for Economic Affairs in the Second United Indonesia Cabinet. Previously, he was the State Secretary, Minister of Transport and Minister for Research and Technology in the Mutual Assistance Cabinet (2001–2004).
- Budi Karya Sumadi – the 32nd Minister of Transportation
- Tito Karnavian – the Minister of Minister of Home Affairs. Previously, he was the chief of Indonesian National Police from 2016 to 2019, and chief of the National Counter Terrorism Agency in 2016
- Edy Rahmayadi – the 18th Governor of North Sumatra
- Tengku Mansur – Malay Nationalist, the first and only Wali Negara of the State of East Sumatra
- Amir Hamzah – an Indonesian poet and National Hero of Indonesia.
- Hamzah Haz – an Indonesian politician. He is the head of the United Development Party (PPP) and served as the ninth Vice-president from 2001 until 2004.
- Farhat Abbas – Celebrity lawyer turned politician
- Raja Juli Antoni – 11th Minister of Forestry
- D. N. Aidit – Communist politician, second General Secretary of the Communist Party of Indonesia
- Ansar Ahmad – the 5th Governor of Riau Islands
- Alex Noerdin – the 15th Governor of South Sumatra
- Taufiq Kiemas – Speaker of the People's Consultative Assembly of Indonesia 2009-2013
- Muhammad Lukman Edy – the former Minister for Acceleration of Disadvantaged Regions in 2007-2009
- Muhammad Sani – the 2nd Governor of Riau Island
- Usman Ja'far – the 7th Governor of West Kalimantan
- Tengku Rizal Nurdin – the 13th Governor of North Sumatra
- Antasari Azhar – 2nd Chairman of the Corruption Eradication Commission
- Tengku Erry Nuradi – the 17th Governor of North Sumatra
- Yusril Ihza Mahendra – Minister of Justice and Human Rights from 2004-2007 and 2024-2029 and member of the People's Representative Council 1999-2009
- Bachtiar Djafar – Military officer and former mayor of Medan (1990-2000)
- Rusli Zainal – the 13th Governor of Riau
- Tantowi Yahya – Indonesian TV presenter turned politician.
- Sutarmidji – the 9th Governor of West Kalimantan
- Zulkifli Nurdin – the 6th and 7th Governor of Jambi

=== Entertainment ===
- A. T. Mahmud – composer
- Carissa Putri – Indonesian model and actress
- Revalina Sayuthi Temat – Indonesian actress, popularly known for her work in Bawang Merah Bawang Putih
- Jessica Iskandar – actress, model and singer
- Titi Kamal – prominent Indonesian actress and singer
- Boes Boestami – journalist and film actor
- Ermina Zaenah – actress and film producer
- Farah Quinn – celebrity chef
- Anna Maria Marten – model
- Fiona Fachru Nisa – actress and model
- Gibran Marten – actor and singer
- Gading Marten – actor, presenter and former footballer
- Sheryl Gething – singer and actress
- Raline Shah – actress, philanthropist, and entrepreneur
- Nun Zairina – actress, dancer and model
- Iyeth Bustami – Indonesian dangdut singer
- Nia Daniati – singer and actress
- Shandy Aulia – actress and model
- Wahid Satay – Singaporean actor and comedian (born in Indonesia)

=== Others ===
- Sunan Giri – one of the Wali Sanga of Indonesia.
- Adi Hidayat – Islamic scholar and preacher
- Abdul Somad – Islamic cleric and scholar
- Ramadhan Sananta – Professional footballer
- Alvin Sariaatmadja – entrepreneur and investor, co-owner of US Lecce football club
- Eddy Kusnadi Sariaatmadja – Conglomerate and entrepreneur, owner of Emtek

== See also ==
- Proto-Malay
