= Kubu =

Kubu may refer to:

== People ==
- Kubu people, indigenous people in central Sumatra, Indonesia
  - Kubu language, Austronesian language spoken by the Kubu people
- Kubu Kubu (died c. 1954), general in the Mau Mau uprising
- "KuBu", fan contraction for NASCAR driver Kurt Busch

== Places ==
=== Botswana ===
- Kubu Island

=== Indonesia ===
- Kubu Raya Regency, regency in West Kalimantan, Borneo
- Kubu Sultanate, a former sultanate in West Kalimantan, Borneo
- Kubu, Bali, a subdistrict in Karangasem Regency
- Kubu, Riau, a subdistrict in Rokan Hilir Regency
- Kubu, West Kalimantan, a subdistrict in Kubu Raya Regency

== Other uses ==
- Contraction for Jüdischer Kulturbund
- Kubu, a Kirrule-type ferry, and the last operating steam powered Sydney Ferry, retired 1959.
- KUBU-LP, a low-power radio station (96.5 FM) licensed to serve Sacramento, California, United States
- Kubu, an alternate name for djenging, large houseboats of the Sama-Bajau people of the Philippines
