= Farhat Abbas =

Indonesian lawyer

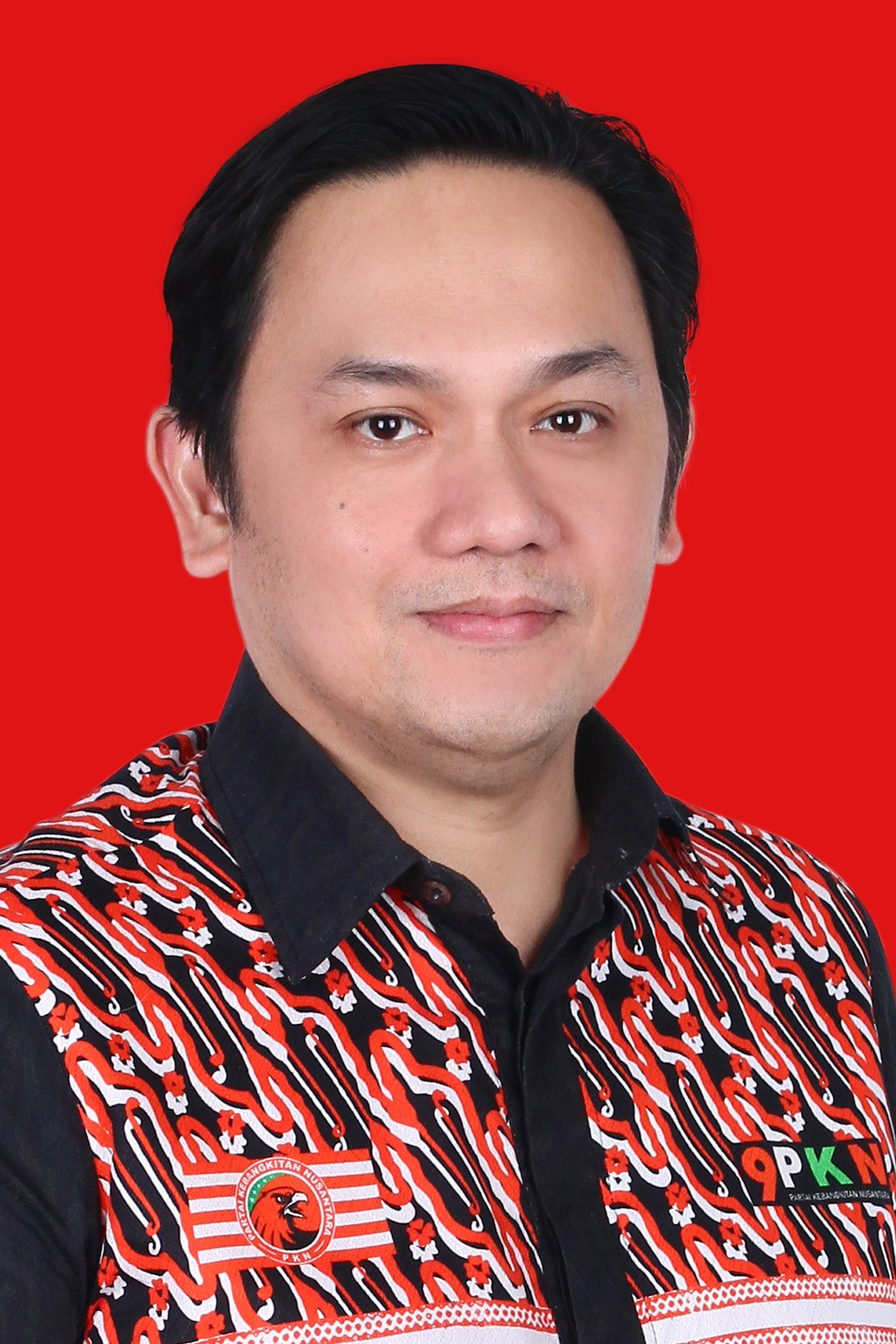
- Born: 22 June 1976 (age 50); Tembilahan, Riau, Indonesia
- Occupations: Celebrity; Lawyer
- Years active: 1999–present
- Political party: Nusantara Awakening Party
- Spouses: Nia Daniati (m. 2002; div. 2014) Ani Muryadi (m. 2005) Rita Tresnawati (m. 2011)

Farhat Abbas (born 22 June 1976) is an Indonesian celebrity and lawyer who is known for representing celebrities such as Ahmad Dhani, Soimah and Caisar.

== Career ==
Abbas was an unsuccessful candidate in the general election of Regional Head for Kolaka in Southeast Sulawesi in October 2013. In addition, Abbas campaigned as an independent presidential candidate with the slogan "Aku Indonesia." He also ran unsuccessfully as a legislative candidate in the 2014 presidential elections to represent the third electoral district of Jakarta in Senayan.

In 2020, Abbas founded his own political party, the Indonesian Sovereign Nation Party, or Pandai.

== Personal life ==
In 2002, Abbas married singer Nia Daniati. The couple divorced after 12 years of marriage in 2014. In May 2014, Abbas married widow Ani Muryadi.

Soon after, a woman named Rita Tresnawati went to the National Commission for Child Protection to reveal that Abbas did not recognize his son, Gusti Reyhan Gibayus, despite providing the child's birth certificate, which listed Abbas as the father.

== Controversy ==
=== Allegedly racist comments ===
Abbas became involved in controversy when he commented on Twitter regarding the case of car registration imposed by Jakarta's co-government Basuki Tjahaja Purnama (also known as Ahok). Some parties had accused Abbas of racist comments. As a result, Abbas has reported Chairman of the Indonesian Chinese Islamic Association Anton Medan and Intellectual Community of Muda Betawi leader Ramdan Alamsyah to Polda Metro Jaya. Abbas admitted that he made the comments, but denies that he is a racist.

=== Personal disputes ===
After the conclusion of his case with Jakarta co-government Ahok, Abbas was involved in hostility with Ahmad Dhani's son Ahmad Al Ghazali and El Rumi, due to insulting his father on Twitter. Abbas accepted Ghazali's challenge to a boxing duel. Abbas was also involved in hostility with dangdut singer Soimah, due to her kebaya appearance in @Show_imah. Abbas was further involved in controversy with Arya Wiguna, involving accusations of cheating.

=== Alleged affair ===
Abbas was alleged to have had an affair with his spokeswoman, Regina Andriane Saputra, the wife of politician Ilal Ferhard.
