= Sekak people =

Ethnic group in Indonesia

Sekak
Orang Sekak

Regions with significant populations
- Indonesia (Bangka Island)

Languages
- Loncong (Sekak), Bangka Malay

Religion
- Animism (dominant); Islam, Christianity

Related ethnic groups
- Bangka Malay, Sawang, Mapur

The Sekak people (Loncong: Orang Sekak) are an Austronesian ethnic group who inhabit the Bangka Belitung Islands. The Sekak are some of the most ancient peoples living on Bangka Island, with most still following animism or local beliefs. However, in recent times, some have adopted Islam or Christianity. They inhabit the northern coastal areas of Bangka Island, with livelihoods primarily as fishermen.

The Sekak people are descendants of the Mantang people, one of the oldest groups of the Orang Laut (Sea People). Sekak are considered part of the Old Malay community, and share similarities with other ancient groups on the Sumatran mainland. Today, they are no longer considered an isolated ethnic group, as they have adapted to external cultural influences.

The Sekak are known as sea experts with a strong work ethic, generosity, and a law-abiding nature.
