= Nia Daniati =

Indonesian singer and actress

- Born: 17 April 1964 (age 62); Bandung, Indonesia
- Occupations: Singer; actress
- Years active: 1980–present
- Spouses: Mohammad Hisham (m. 1991; div. 1993) Farhat Abbas (m. 2002; div. 2014)
- Children: 2
- Musical career
- Genres: Pop
- Labels: Akurama Records; Blackboard

Nia Daniati (born 17 April 1964) is an Indonesian singer and actress. Daniati gained fame with her hit single "Gelas-Gelas Kaca" and also through singing several songs written by musician Rinto Harahap. In addition, Daniati has appeared in several soap operas and films, including Antara Dia dan Aku which led to her being nominated for the Best Actress at the Indonesian Film Festival.

Daniati released many studio albums and singles in the 1980s and 1990s during her career in the local music industry.

== Early and personal life ==
Nia Daniati was born on 17 April 1964, the sixth of ten children.

On 25 September 1991, Daniati married Mohammad Hisham, a businessman from Brunei in Jakarta and the couple later had a daughter. After a year of marriage, Daniati and Hisham divorced. In 2002, Daniati married lawyer Farhat Abbas, who is 12 years her junior. In 2014, Daniati filed for divorce.

In November 2021, her daughter Olivia Nathania was arrested for a civil servant candidate (CPNS) recruitment fraud. Her son-in-law was arrested in 2021.

== Discography ==
=== Studio albums ===
- Country vol.1
- Nia Daniati The Best Of Pop Bossas
- Nia Daniati Mega Pop Intim Vol 3
- Nia Daniati 15 Lagu Terbaik
- Tembang Asmara Vol. 1 (Siapa Tak Ingin Disayang)
- Tembang Asmara Vol. 3 (Masih Ada Cinta)
- Tembang Asmara Vol. 4 (Tak Ingin Seperti Dia)
- Tembang Asmara Vol. 6 (Aku Tak Ingin Dimadu)
- Tak Ingin Seperti Dia I (1993)
- Tak Ingin Seperti Dia II (1998)
- Tak Ingin Seperti Dia III (2016)

== Filmography ==
Year	Title	Role	Notes
1979	Antara Dia dan Aku	Nur	Debut film Nominated – 1980 Indonesian Film Festival for Best Leading Actress
1980	Senyum untuk Mama		Supporting role
1980	Nostalgia di SMA	Anggra	Supporting role
1981	Setetes Kasih di Padang Gersang		
2016	Gelas Gelas Kaca		
