= Malayness =

Socio-political term

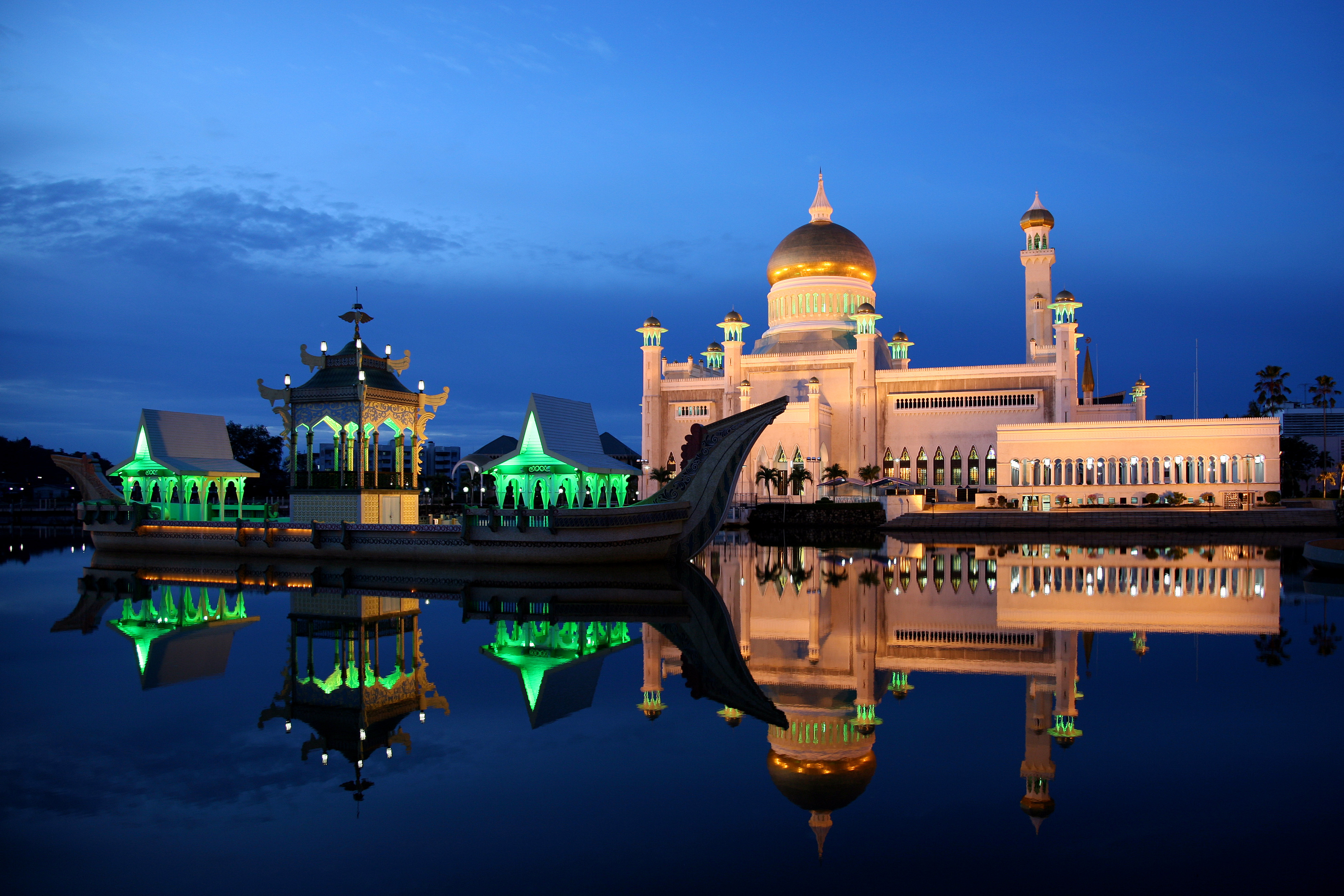
Sultan Omar Ali Saifuddin Mosque in Brunei on the eve of Ramadan. The wealthy kingdom adopted Melayu Islam Beraja (Malay Islamic Monarchy) as the national philosophy since its independence in 1984.

Malayness (Malay: Kemelayuan, Jawi: كملايوان) is the state of being Malay or of embodying Malay characteristics. This may include that which binds and distinguishes the Malay people and forms the basis of their unity and identity. People who call themselves Malay are found in many countries in Southeast Asia, united by a notional shared identity but divided by political boundaries, divergent histories, variant dialects and peculiarities of local experience. While the term 'Malay' is widely used and readily understood in the region, it remains open to varying interpretations due to its varied and fluid characteristics. 'Malay' as an identity, or nationality, is considered one of the most challenging and perplexing concepts in the multi-ethnic world of Southeast Asia.

Much of the ethos of Malay identity are thought to originate from the ascendancy of Melaka Sultanate in the 15th century. After the fall of Melaka in 1511, the notion of Malayness developed in two ways: to claim lines of kingship or acknowledge descent from Srivijaya and Melaka, and to refer to a pluralistic commercial diaspora around the peripheries of the Malay world that retained the Malay language, customs and trade practices of the Melaka emporium. By the mid 20th century, an anti-Western colonialism concept of a romanticized Malayness has been an integral component of Malay nationalism, succeeded in ending the British rule in Malaya.

Today, the most commonly accepted pillars of Malayness; the Malay rulers, Malay language and culture, and Islam, are institutionalized in both Malay majority countries, Brunei and Malaysia. As a still fully functioning Malay sultanate, Brunei proclaimed Malay Islamic Monarchy as its national philosophy. In Malaysia, where the sovereignty of individual subnational Malay sultanates and the position of Islam are preserved, a Malay identity is defined in Article 160 of the Constitution of Malaysia.

== History ==
=== Pre-European period ===
The Malay World, the home of the Malayic Austronesian tribes since the last ice age (circa 15,000–10,000 BCE), exhibits fascinating ethnic, linguistic and cultural variations as a result of having inherited different layers of foreign influences. The indigenous Animistic belief system, which employed the concept of semangat (spirit) in every natural objects, was predominant among the ancient Malayic tribes before the arrival of Dharmic religions around the beginning of first millennium CE. The Dharmic period was in turn superseded by the introduction of Islam and regional expansion of Malay sultanates from the 12th century onwards.

The term 'Melayu' (Malay) and its variants predates the Islamic era, in a sense which appears to apply as an old toponym to the Strait of Melaka region in general. Among the notable occurrences are Malayadvipa in Vayu Purana, Maleu-Kolon in the 2nd century Ptolemy's Geographia (on the west coast of Golden Chersonese), Mo-Lo-Yu in the 7th century Yijing's account, Malaiur in the 11th century's inscriptions in Brihadeeswarar Temple, Malai in 12th century Idrisi's Tabula Rogeriana, Malayu in the 13th century Padang Roco Inscription, Ma-li-yu-er in the 13th century's Yuan chronicle, Malauir in the 13th century's Marco Polo's account, and Malayapura in the 14th century's Amoghapasa inscription.

Despite its ancient origin, the term 'Melayu' did not establish itself as an ethnonym at least until the advent of the Melaka Sultanate in the 15th century. Islamisation developed an ethnoreligious identity in Melaka, with the term 'Melayu' then beginning to appear as interchangeable with Melakans, especially in describing the cultural preferences of the Melakans as compared to those of foreigners. Tome Pires explained how Melaka itself classified merchants into four groups, among which the Malayos or Melayu did not appear, suggesting they were not then regarded as a category outside of Melaka itself. It remains unclear when the notion of Malayness began to characterise areas beyond Melaka, but it is generally believed that Malayisation intensified within the Strait of Melaka region following the territorial and commercial expansion of the sultanate in the mid-15th century.

=== European period ===
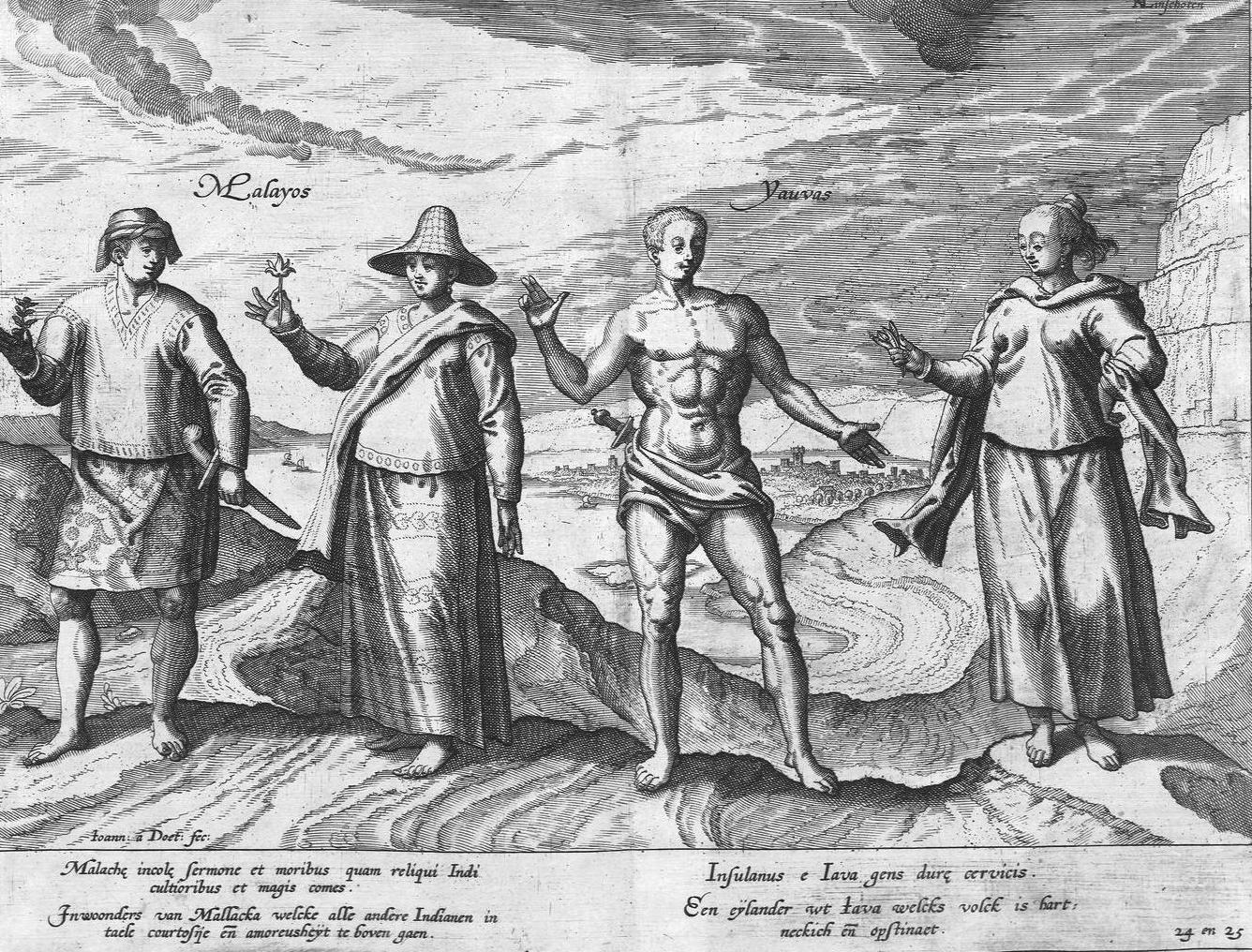
The Malays and the Javanese, Joannes van Doetecum's 1596 engraving in Jan Huyghen van Linschoten's Itinerario, one of the earliest depiction of Malays in European art. The two Dutch legends read "Inhabitants of Malacca, the best speakers, the most polite and the most amorous of the East Indies." and "Inhabitants of Java, who are hard-headed and obstinate."

By the 16th and 17th centuries, 'Malay' and 'Malayness' were associated with two major elements; first, a line of kingship acknowledging descent from Srivijaya and Melaka; and second, a commercial diaspora retaining the customs, language and trade practices of Melaka. In his 16th century Malay word-list, Antonio Pigafetta made a reference to how the phrase chiara Malaiu ('Malay ways') was used in the Maritime Southeast Asia, to refer to the al parlare de Malaea (Italian for 'to speak of Melaka').

Kingship, and its polity (kerajaan), was a prominent pillar of Malayness in the area around the Strait of Melaka. Islam was another pillar because it provided kingship with some of its core values. The commercial diaspora constituted a group of people outside the Strait of Melaka area—Borneo, Makassar and Java—who defined their Malayness primarily in terms of language and customs, which were the third and fourth accepted pillars of Malayness, respectively. While Islam was an objective criterion to define the kingship and his subjects (Muslim and non-Muslims), anyone who claimed to embrace Islam could be counted as Malay. Non-Muslims and non-Malays could be labelled as Malays as long as they spoke and wrote Malay and followed a Malay way of life, or if they Masuk Melayu—meaning, don certain clothes, follow certain culinary practices, and become an integral part of the Malay-speaking trading network. The Portuguese, Spanish and Dutch used the labels 'Malay' and 'Malayness' in this way.

The subjective aspect of Malay and Malayness allowed a distinct plurality in the composition of the category 'Malay', since it was open to new recruits from any background, both within and outside the Malay World. In the 18th century, the people of Siak in eastern Sumatra, through violence and literary text, succeeded in becoming a subgroup within the larger Malay community, similarly in the 19th century Riau, powerful migrant Bugis elites within the Malay heartland, diplomatically negotiated and legitimized their positions, thus gaining the needed identity as Malay. Other instances can also be observed in North Sumatra and Borneo, where tribal communities, in particular the Batak and Dayak peoples, being systematically drawn into the Malay sultanates.

In British Malaya, the principle of 'plural society' underscored the social order of the modern colonial and post-colonial periods. From the 17th–19th centuries, the colonial administrators—first the Dutch, followed by the British—redefined the meaning of 'Malay' and 'Malayness', setting boundaries legitimized by rules of law and policies, thus elevating it to a 'nation'. After the establishment of the Straits Settlements in 1824, the concept of a Malay ethnicity gradually became 'Malay nation', an identity that was accepted by both the colonial power and the Malays themselves, primarily as the result of the growing presence of others who were either European or Chinese. As early as the 1840s, the writer Abdullah Munshi used the term Bangsa Melayu ('Malay nation'), and that term gradually entered the public sphere. The 1891 colonial census recognized three racial categories, namely, Chinese, Tamil, and Malay. With increased immigration of Chinese and Indian labour to Malaya in the early 1900s, a plural society was established, in which the concept of Malay as a nation became fixed and indelible.

=== Decolonisation and modern period ===
The modern Malay tricolour to symbolise Malayness.

Malay nationalism, which developed in the early 1900s, had a cultural rather than a political character. The discussions on a 'Malay nation' focused on questions of identity and distinction in terms of customs, religion, and language, rather than politics. The debate surrounding the transition centred on the question of who could be called the real Malay, and the friction led to the emergence of various factions amongst Malay nationalists.

The leftists from Kesatuan Melayu Muda were among the earliest who appeared with an ideal of a Republic of Greater Indonesia for a Pan-Malay identity. The version of Malayness brought by this group was largely modelled on the anthropological concept of Malay race, that transcend the religious boundary and with the absence of the role of monarchy. Another attempt to redefine the Malayness was made by a coalition of left wing political parties, the AMCJA, that proposed the term 'Melayu' as a demonym or citizenship for an independent Malaya.

In the wake of the armed rebellion launched by the Malayan Communist Party, the activities of most left wing organizations came to a halt following the declaration of Malayan Emergency in 1948 that witnessed a major clampdown by the British colonial government. This development left those of moderate and traditionalist faction, with an opportunity to gain their ground in the struggle for Malaya's independence. The conservatives led by United Malays National Organization, that vehemently promoted Malay language, Islam and Malay monarchy as pillars of Malayness, emerged with popular support not only from general Malay population, but also from the Rulers of the Conference of Rulers. Mass protests from this group against the Malayan Union, a unitary state project, forced the British to accept an alternative federalist order known as the Federation of Malaya, the Malay translation of which was Persekutuan Tanah Melayu (literally 'Federation of Malay Land'). The federation would later be reconstituted as Malaysia in 1963.

In modern times, the traditional Malay notion of fealty to a ruler, charged to protect Islam in his territory, is central in both Malaysia and Brunei. In Brunei, this has been institutionalized under the state ideology of Malay Islamic Monarchy which proclaimed on the day of its independence on 1 January 1984. As a still functioning Malay sultanate, Brunei places Islamic institutions at the centre of the state's interest. It retains an elaborated Malay social hierarchy central to the community. In Malaysia, nine Malay sultanates were formally absorbed into the foundation of the modern state and the historical association of Malay with Islam is entrenched in the Article 160 of the Constitution of Malaysia.

A degree of Malayness is also retained outside Brunei and Malaysia, in particular, among communities in coaster areas of Sumatra and Kalimantan in Indonesia and Southern region of Thailand, which historically was part of the Malay sultanate.

== See also ==
- Bumiputera
- East Indies
- Ethnic Malays
- Greater Indonesia
- Malay Archipelago
- Malay race
- Malay world
- Malayisation
- Malaysian Malay
- Malaysian Malays
- Maphilindo
- Nusantara
- Pribumi

Regional religion:

- Religion in Malaysia
- Religion in Singapore
- Religion in Thailand

General:

- Ethnoreligious group

== Bibliography ==
- Andaya, Leonard Y. (2008), Leaves of the Same Tree: Trade and Ethnicity in the Straits of Melaka, University of Hawaii press, ISBN 978-0-8248-3189-9
- Azlan Tajuddin (2012), Malaysia in the World Economy (1824–2011): Capitalism, Ethnic Divisions, and "Managed" Democracy, Lexington Books, ISBN 978-0-7391-7196-7
- Barnard, Timothy P. (2004), Contesting Malayness: Malay identity across boundaries, Singapore: Singapore University press, ISBN 9971-69-279-1
- Barrington, Lowell (2006), After Independence: Making and Protecting the Nation in Postcolonial and Postcommunist States, University of Michigan press, ISBN 978-0-472-06898-2
- Benjamin, Geoffrey; Chou, Cynthia (2002), Tribal Communities in the Malay World: Historical, Cultural and Social Perspectives, London: Institute of Southeast Asian Studies, ISBN 978-981-230-166-6
- Blackburn, Kevin; Hack, Karl (2012), War, Memory and the Making of Modern Malaysia and Singapore, National University of Singapore, ISBN 978-9971-69-599-6
- Chong, Terence (2008), Globalization and Its Counter-forces in Southeast Asia, Institute of Southeast Asian Studies, ISBN 978-981-230-478-0
- Hall, Daniel George Edward (1981), History of South East Asia, Macmillan, ISBN 978-0-333-24163-9
- Hefner, Robert W. (2001), Politics of Multiculturalism: Pluralism and Citizenship in Malaysia, Singapore, and Indonesia, University of Hawaii Press, ISBN 978-0-8248-2487-7
- Hood Salleh (2011), The Encyclopedia of Malaysia, vol. 12 - Peoples and Traditions, Editions Didier Millet, ISBN 978-981-3018-53-2
- Hoyt, Sarnia Hayes (1993), Old Malacca, Oxford University Press, ISBN 978-0-19-588619-1
- Khoo, Boo Teik; Loh, Francis (2001), Democracy in Malaysia: Discourses and Practices (Democracy in Asia), Routledge, ISBN 978-0-7007-1161-1
- Kipp, Rita Smith (1996), Dissociated Identities: Ethnicity, Religion, and Class in an Indonesian Society, University of Michigan Press, ISBN 978-0-472-08402-9
- Milner, Anthony (2010), The Malays (The Peoples of South-East Asia and the Pacific), Wiley-Blackwell, ISBN 978-1-4443-3903-1
- Zaki Ragman (2003), Gateway to Malay culture, Asiapac Books Pte Ltd, ISBN 981-229-326-4
