= Anton Medan =

Indonesian criminal (1957–2021)

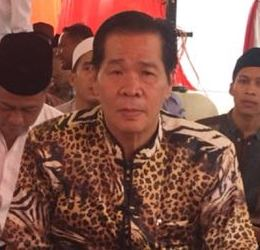
- Born: Tan Hok Liang; October 10, 1957; Tebing Tinggi, Indonesia
- Died: March 15, 2021 (aged 63); Bogor, Indonesia
- Occupations: former robber, gambling tycoon, Islamic preacher

Anton Medan, or Haji Muhammad Ramdhan Effendi, birth name Tan Hok Liang (10 October 1957 – 15 March 2021), born in Tebing Tinggi, was an Indonesian former robber and gambling tycoon who converted to Islam and became a preacher in 1992. He later established a mosque, Masjid Jami' Tan Hok Liang, in Pondok Rajeg, Cibinong, Bogor. Prior to his conversion to Islam, he grew up amid the dark politics of Indonesia. It was during Suharto's New Order rule when gangsters were used in politics, business and government agencies.

In 1998, Anton Medan was used as a scapegoat for the orchestration of the Jakarta Riots after which the allegation was then quietly dropped. The riot, which was initially a student demonstration to protest against the Indonesian president Suharto, turned into an anti-Chinese riots in the capital Jakarta. Anton Medan was of Chinese descent, but he took to the street and joined the riot to prove that he was loyal to the people but he himself became a target. In the political turmoil of 1998, it was also reported that Prabowo Subianto, Suharto's son-in-law and the commander of Kopassus, the Indonesian Special Forces, had recruited and manipulated Anton Medan to gain militant supporters.

During the investigation of the 1998 riot, Anton Medan denied the accusation that he was actively involved behind the scenes, although he admitted that he was in the part of the mob. However, he refused to testify unless the National Human Rights Commission rehabilitated his name first.
