= Malay tricolour =

Symbol of Malays

Malay tricolour, very similar to the Flag of Mali

A horizontal variant of the tricolour, as used in Riau, Indonesia.

A tricolour featuring green, yellow and red, is a combination of colours that commonly found in varying designs of symbols adopted by some major organisations to symbolise the Malay people.

== Symbolism ==
The tricolour is derived from the three important values of Malayness; Islam, Malay rulers and Malay culture. The green is the traditional colour of Islam, a faith that has been the integral part of Malay culture. The yellow is the royal colour commonly associated with Malay sultans, and used to allude the allegiance of Malay people to their Rulers. The third colour, red, is the traditional colour in Malay culture, used to denote the courage, bravery, heroism and loyalty. The shade of red nicknamed kesumba red that is identical to scarlet and commonly associated with blood, is the existential colour of the Malays and is the most frequently cited colour in the literature.

The oldest Malay state, Kedah, also adopted the red as its traditional colour.

== Usage ==
Despite having deep roots in Malay traditions, the green, yellow and red as a collective symbolism only surfaced in 1933, when the Royal Malay Regiment was founded. Both the regimental crest and flag bear the tricolour, as soldiers of the regiment swore their allegiance to the Sultans of Malay states, then the protectorates of the British Empire. In 1946, when Malay nationalist movement at its peak, the right wing United Malays National Organisation (UMNO) adopted the tricolour in its flag. The party, which would lead Malaya to its independence and govern the nation until 2018, included the additional white band to its flag to symbolise purity After UMNO, the tricolour also appears in the symbols of other right wing organisations like Pekida and Perkasa, and some major Silat associations in Malaysia, including Seni Gayong and Seni Gayung Fatani.

The tricolour also gained popularity among those in the gang population. One of the notorious criminal gangs outlawed by the Malaysian government, the Tiga Line ('the three lines'), established its identity based on the tricolour.

Across the Straits of Malacca in Riau and Riau Islands in Sumatra where the Indonesian Malays having a strong historical and cultural ties with the Malay Peninsula, the colours hold a philosophical symbol similar to its their kin in the Mainland Southeast Asia. The tricolours, locally named and shaded as Kuning Keemasan (Golden yellow), Hijau Lumut (Forest green) and Merah Darah Burung (Torch red) is in extensive use for ceremonial and cultural purposes and can be seen donning throughout the cities and towns of the region, its also considered as a favourite colour for the traditional Malay weddings in the two provinces.

== Gallery ==
Flag of the Royal Malay Regiment.

Flag of the United Malays National Organisation, known as the Sang Saka Bangsa

Modern flag of Kedah.

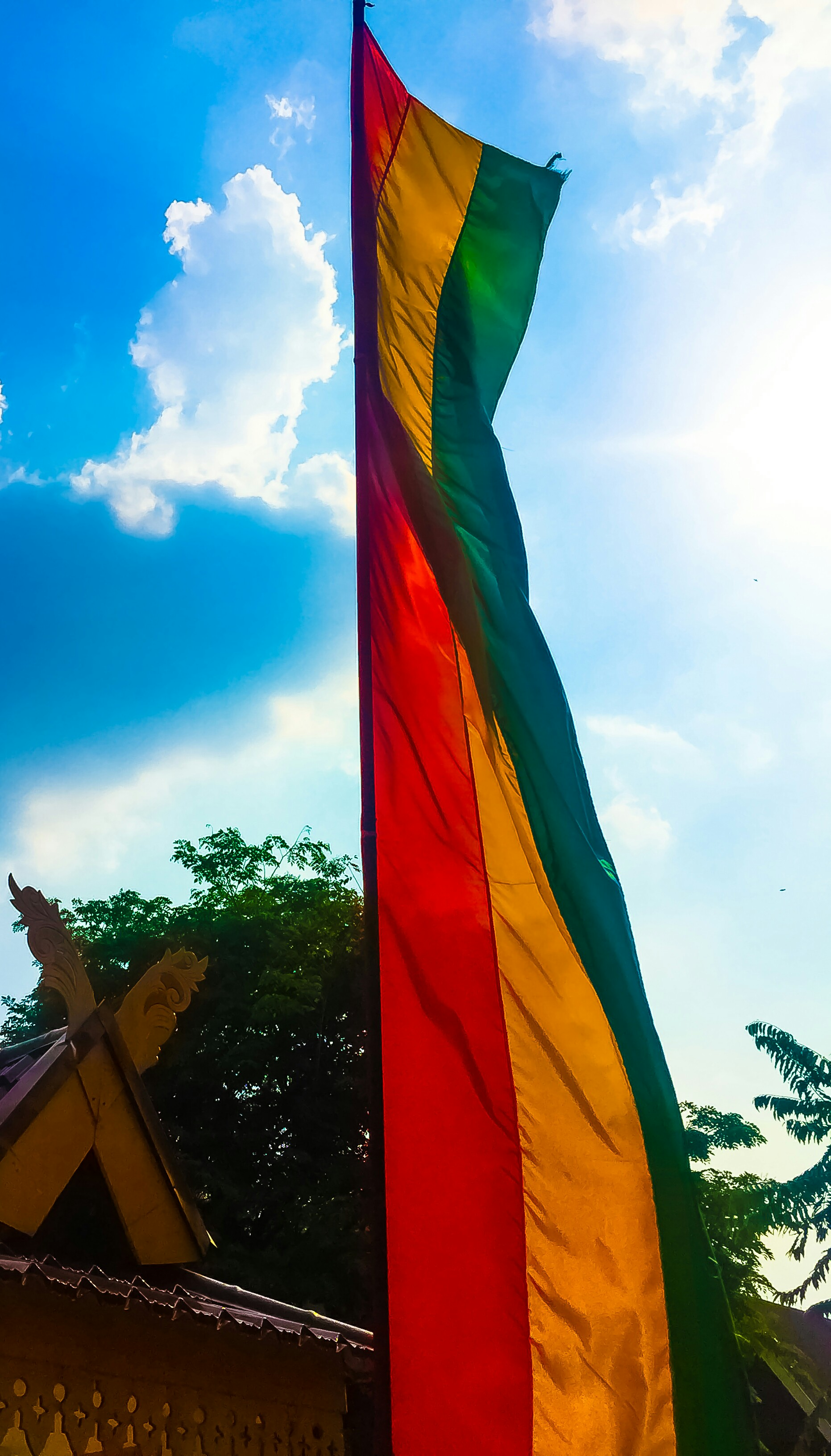
A Malay tricolour flag as displayed in Pekanbaru, Riau, Indonesia.

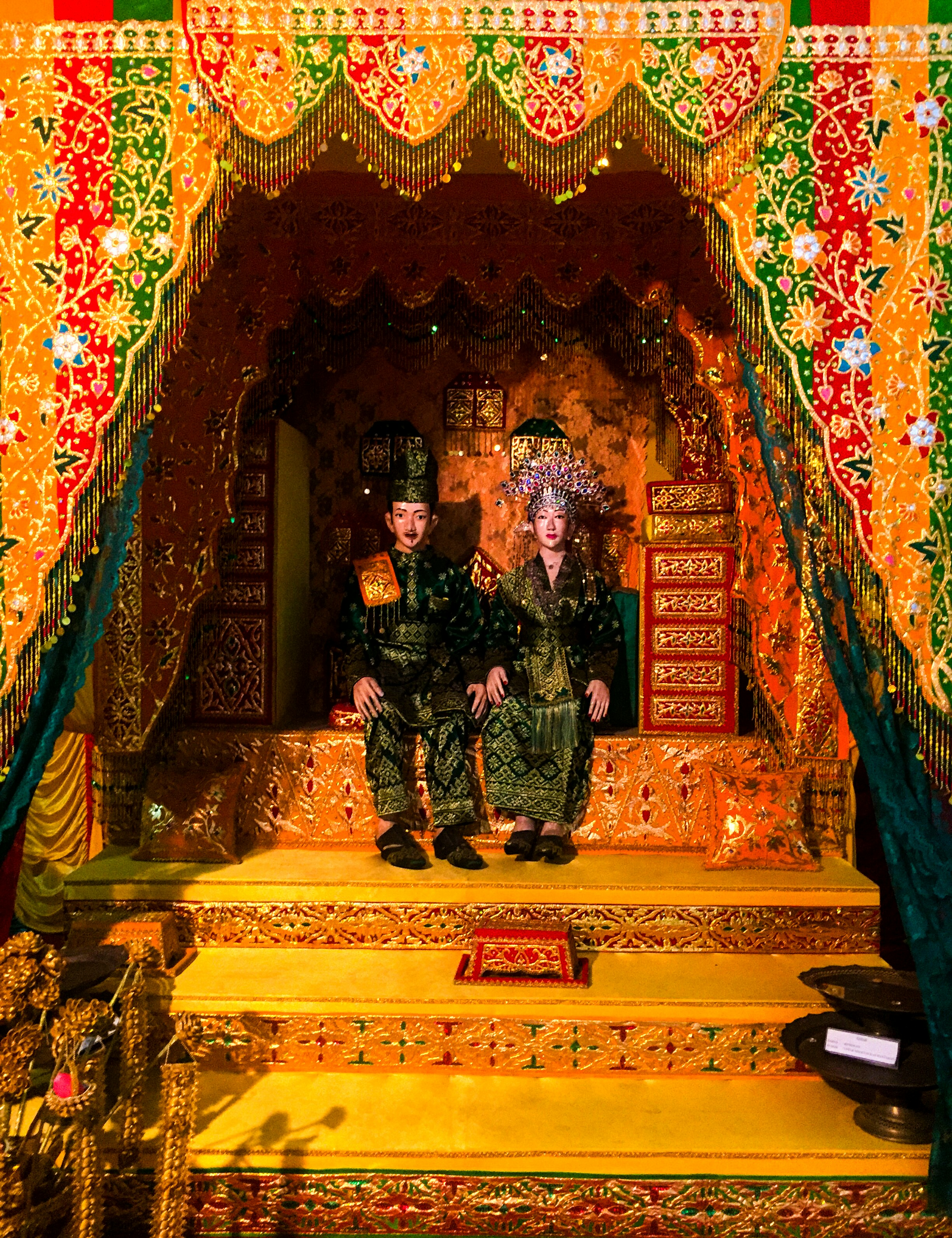
Replica of a traditional wedding dais that incorporated the Malay tricolour.

== See also ==
- Sang Saka Malaya
- Flag of Batak
- Malayness
- Marawa Minangkabau
- Pan-African colours

== Bibliography ==
- Blackburn, Kevin; Hack, Karl (2012), War, Memory and the Making of Modern Malaysia and Singapore, National University of Singapore, ISBN 978-997-169-599-6
- Che Husna Azhari (1997), "Teknologi Warna Alam Melayu (Dye technology of the Malay world)", Akademika, 51, Universiti Kebangsaan Malaysia
- Kedah State Government (2015), Profil Negeri - Bendera Negeri ('State profile - State flag'), archived from the original on 2016-01-15
- Lemiere, Sophie (2015), Gangsta to the roots: Gangsta beyond stereotypes, New Mandala, archived from the original on 2015-04-19
- Pertubuhan Silat Seni Gayong (2013), Lambang Gayong (Logo of Gayong), archived from the original on 2022-12-11
- Rahmah Ghazali (2014), "Pekida: We are not rogues", The Star Online
- Rejimen Askar Melayu Diraja (2015), Bendera RAMD (Flag of RAMD), archived from the original on 2015-04-14
- Umno Online (2014), Bendera UMNO : 'Sang Saka Bangsa' (Flag of Umno: 'Sang Saka Bangsa'), archived from the original on 2015-04-21
