= Orang Rimba people =

Indigenous group native to South Sumatra and Jambi

Kubu people
Orang Batin Sembilan, Orang Rimba, Anak Dalam
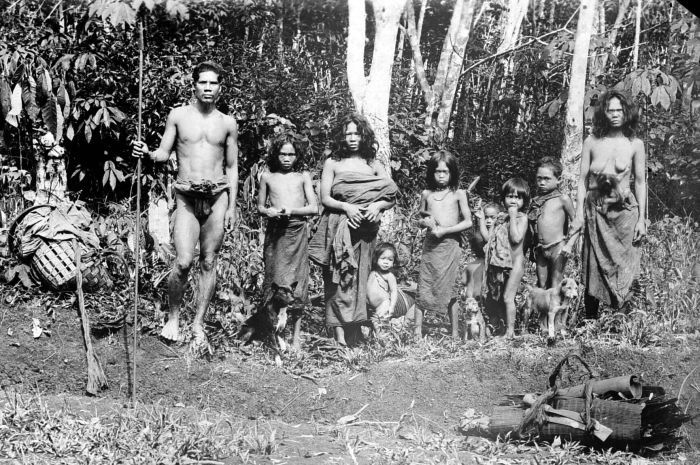
- A group of Kubu people in the 1930s in Jambi, Sumatra.

Total population
- 200,000

Regions with significant populations
- Indonesia
- Jambi: 10,000
- South Sumatra: 35,000
- Riau: N/A

Languages
- Kubu language, Indonesian language

Religion
- Animism, Christianity, Islam

Related ethnic groups
- Malays, Lubu, Orang Asli

The Orang Batin Sembilan, Orang Rimba, or Anak Dalam are mobile, animist peoples who live throughout the lowland forests of southeast Sumatra. Kubu is a Malay exonym applied to them. In the Malay language, the word Kubu can mean 'defensive fortification', 'entrenchment', or 'a place of refuge'. It is metaphor for how the majority and dominant Islamic Malay villagers believe them to use the interior forests as a means for resisting inclusion in the larger Malay social and Islamic religious world. As is the case with other forest peoples in the region, the term Kubu is associated with very negative connotations.

Following Malay classifications, early Europeans divided the Kubu into two categories: 'tame' or 'civilized' Kubu, who were predominantly swidden farmers, and 'wild' Kubu, who lived deep in the forests, and made much stronger efforts to avoid close relations with the outside world. While closely related to Malay-speaking peoples, these peoples represent two separate cultural groups, which have different economic and socio-religious systems.

== Orang Batin Sembilan ==
Traditionally referred to as civilized Kubu, the Orang Batin Sembilan are a larger population of swidden-based peoples who live in the central and eastern lowland forests of South Sumatra (pop. ~35,000) and Jambi (pop. ~10,000). Like other people in the region, these people traditionally use the swidden field as a base camp from which to exploit resources in the forests, particularly when collecting forest products for trade.

== Orang Rimba ==
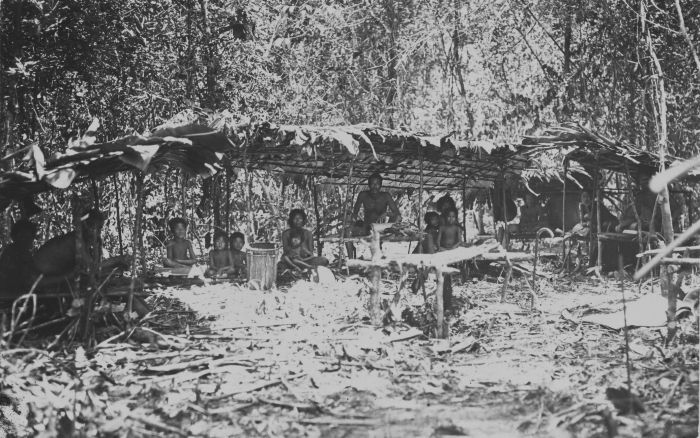
Kubu people in a shelter in the woods in the Upper Tebo-"streken" in the Residence of Jambi.

The Orang Rimba ('people of the forest') are a much smaller population of people (~3,000) who live in the upstream regions of Jambi and South Sumatra. They have a unique, diverse economy, which shifts in and out of two base subsistence strategies: swidden farming and a very nomadic life based on foraging wild yams. This is traditionally combined with hunting, trapping, fishing, and the collection of forest products for trade. For many, part-time rubber tapping and participation in logging has gradually replaced the collection of forest products.

Orang Rimba life is characterized by small and changing camps, which can be the size of a nuclear family when digging for wild yams, but more commonly is based around an extended family, and can include several extended families whenever swidden farming. Their social relations are very egalitarian, while hierarchies are largely based upon age, gender and knowledge of religion and culture law.

The Sokola Rimba is a 2013 Indonesian film featuring the lifestyle of the Rimba people.

== Deforestation and government settlements ==
Since the 1970s, many of these peoples have been displaced from their traditional lands by logging companies and palm oil plantations, and for some time have been the target of government settlement projects. Additionally, the peoples of these tribes are frequently being forcibly converted to state-approved religions, primarily Islam.

== Language ==
The various Kubu languages belong to the Malayo-Polynesian branch of the Austronesian language family. They are isolects of the Malay language spoken in the upstream regions of South Sumatra and Jambi. All are related to the Indonesian language, which is based upon a variant of Malay.

== See also ==
- Proto-Malay
- Sakai people
- Anak Rawa people
