= Kubu language =

Austronesian language spoken in Sumatra, Indonesia

Kubu
- Rimba; Anak Dalam
- Native to: Indonesia
- Region: Sumatra
- Ethnicity: Kubu people
- Native speakers: (10,000 cited 1989)
- Language family: Austronesian: Malayo-Polynesian; Malayic; Kubu
- Dialects: Lalang, Bajat, Ulu Lako, Tungkal, Tungkal Ilir, Dawas, Supat, Jambi, Ridan

Language codes
- ISO 639-3: kvb
- Glottolog: kubu1239

Kubu is a Malayic language spoken in the southern swamps of the island of Sumatra in Indonesia by the Kubu people (Orang Rimba), many of whom are nomadic. There is a degree of dialectal diversity.

In Bukit Duabelas (Jambi), the Rimba language is very glottal, which initially makes it difficult to understand. Some of the variations in Kubu isolects have been presented by Dunggio.
