= Editions Didier Millet =

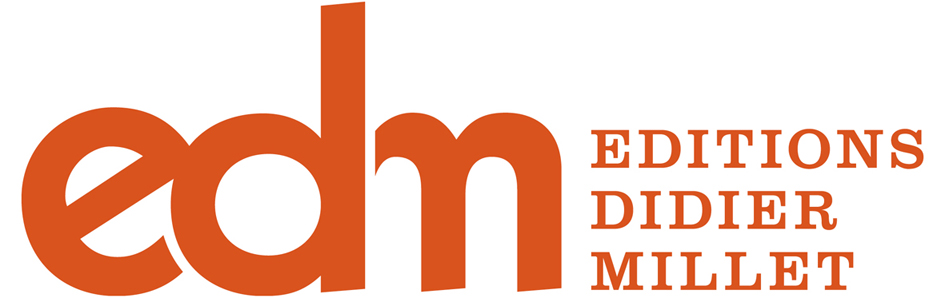
- Founded: 1989
- Founder: Didier Millet
- Country of origin: Singapore
- Distribution: Pansing (Singapore); Swindon Book Co (Hong Kong); Penguin Books (India); National Book Store (Philippines); Asia Books (Thailand); Thames & Hudson (Australia, UK); Roundhouse Group (UK); Continental Sales, Inc. (North America)
- Publication types: Books
- Imprints: Les Editions du Pacifique
- Official website: www.edmbooks.com

Editions Didier Millet is a publisher of illustrated general and reference books, emphasising strongly on Southeast Asia. The company also produces books and catalogues for museums, galleries, corporations and other institutions.

The company was established in 1989, headquartered in Singapore. It has offices in Kuala Lumpur, Bali and Paris. It sells and distributes its books in Southeast Asia, and sells elsewhere by co-editions with other publishers, including Harvard University Press and Tuttle in the US, HarperCollins and Thames & Hudson in the UK, Christian Verlag in Germany and Oxford University Press and Penguin in India. Archipelago Press is an imprint of Editions Didier Millet.

== Books published by Editions Didier Millet ==
Editions Didier Millet publishes approximately 40 titles a year. Some important titles include:

- Chronicle of Malaysia
- Chronicle of Singapore
- Chronicle of Thailand
- Sketchbook series
- The Chic Collection
- The Encyclopedia of Malaysia
- Indonesian Heritage Series
- Singapore: A Pictorial History 1819–2000
- Malaysia: A Pictorial History 1400–2004
- Letters and Books of Sir Stamford Raffles and Lady Raffles
- Singapore: The Encyclopedia
- Thailand: Nine Days in the Kingdom
