= Howe Yoon Chong =

Singaporean politician (1923–2007)

Howe Yoon Chong DUBC PJG
- 侯永昌

Minister for Health
- In office 1 June 1982 – 2 January 1985
- Prime Minister: Lee Kuan Yew
- Preceded by: Goh Chok Tong
- Succeeded by: Richard Hu

Minister for Defence
- In office 12 February 1979 – 1 June 1982
- Prime Minister: Lee Kuan Yew
- Preceded by: Goh Keng Swee
- Succeeded by: Goh Chok Tong

Member of the Singapore Parliament for Potong Pasir SMC
- In office 10 February 1979 – 4 December 1984
- Preceded by: Ivan Baptist
- Succeeded by: Chiam See Tong (SDP)

Personal details
- Born: 12 August 1923 Meixian County, Guangdong Province, Republic of China
- Died: 21 August 2007 (aged 84) Singapore
- Cause of death: Stroke
- Party: People's Action Party (1979–1984)
- Spouse: Wan Fook Yin
- Children: 3
- Education: Raffles College (BA)

Howe Yoon Chong (Note: Chinese: 侯永昌; Pha̍k-fa-sṳ: Hèu Yún-chhông; pinyin: Hóu Yǒngchāng) (12 August 1923 – 21 August 2007) was a Singaporean politician and civil servant who was Minister for Defence between 1979 and 1982, and Minister for Health between 1982 and 1985. A member of the governing People's Action Party (PAP), he was the Member of Parliament (MP) for Potong Pasir SMC between 1979 and 1984.

Howe was key in developing Singapore's infrastructural and financial framework, including the Mass Rapid Transit (MRT) system, Singapore Changi Airport and public housing.

As Minister for Health, to address issues raised by a greying population, he made the controversial proposal in 1984, to raise the age for the withdrawal of Central Provident Fund (CPF) savings from 55 to 60 years so that "Singaporeans will have more money to live on in their old age".

== Early life and education ==
Born in China on 12 August 1923 to a Hakka family, Howe was the son of a liquor shop owner who migrated to Malacca, British Malaya. Howe received his early education at St. Francis Institution in Malacca from 1933 to 1940, and was once a schoolmate of Lee Kuan Yew at Raffles Institution in Singapore. He graduated from Raffles College with a Bachelor of Arts with honours degree in economics in 1953.

== Civil Service career ==
Howe had worked in the Civil Service for almost 30 years. He began his career as a teacher, then was a broadcaster for a period before taking the post of an administrative officer in the British Colonial Secretariat. Howe was subsequently appointed as a police magistrate and later secretary to Public Service Commission (PSC).

In 1960, Howe became the inaugural CEO of the Housing and Development Board (HDB). He was Chairman and President of the DBS Bank between 1970 and 1979, inaugural Chairman of the PSA International, Permanent Secretary in the Prime Minister's Office (PMO), and the head of the Singapore Civil Service.

During his tenure as a senior civil servant, Howe played a leading role in several of Singapore's iconic infrastructural projects like the Mass Rapid Transit (MRT), Singapore Changi Airport and public housing.

Known by his colleagues from the civil service as a fierce, tough-talking man, Howe debated vehemently with former Deputy Prime Minister Goh Keng Swee over whether to build the MRT system in Singapore. Howe was strongly in favour of the MRT as the backbone of Singapore's public transport system, while Goh proposed a more economical all-bus alternative.

Howe fought strongly against the extension plans for a second runway at Paya Lebar Airport, and advocated the building of a new international airport in Changi. This was despite the Cabinet's decision for the go-ahead in 1972, based on a British expert's report that it would cost less to expand Paya Lebar Airport and that there was not enough time to get Changi built up to meet increasing traffic needs. Howe gathered a team to reclaim land, widened and extended the old Royal Air Force airstrip to take Boeing 747s and build the terminal. In August 1981, operations stopped overnight at Paya Lebar Airport and restarted the next morning at Changi Airport. Howe's role in setting up Changi Airport won him credit in Lee Kuan Yew's memoirs.

Howe also fast-tracked the public housing programme while the CEO of HDB under Chairman Lim Kim San in the early years, solving the chronic housing shortage in the 1960s. He undertook the politically and technically arduous task of starting up Toa Payoh New Town, and faced organised opposition to the resettlement of Toa Payoh and the removal of squatters. As Chairman of PSA, Howe went against the advice of professionals to build Singapore's first container terminal in the early 1970s.

In 1991, Howe helped to set up a managed fund, the Mendaki Growth Fund, for the Malay self-help group Mendaki, the Council for the Development of Singapore Muslim Community.

== Political career ==
Howe's first call to enter politics came as early as 1953 from Lee Kuan Yew, then a practising lawyer. However, he declined Lee's invitation as he believed that Singapore needed civil servants in light of the repatriation of British forces during the post-World War II period. In 1979, Howe was again persuaded by Prime Minister Lee and Minister for Finance Goh Keng Swee to enter politics, and he eventually agreed.

In 1979, upon being named as a People's Action Party (PAP) candidate in by-elections called in seven constituencies, Howe said he hoped to serve no more than five years. After submitting his nomination papers in the by-election, Howe dismissed the opposition candidates, including independent Chiam See Tong, as "court jesters" who had come out "to provide comic relief". Howe eventually beat Chiam with almost 67% of the votes to win the Potong Pasir Constituency seat.

On 12 February 1979, Howe was sworn into the Cabinet as Minister for Defence. Directness being his hallmark, just six months after becoming Defence Minister Howe said that those who dodged national service ought to be looked upon as "pariah" in the community.

In the 1980 Singaporean general election, Howe again defeated Chiam for Potong Pasir, and duly was the Member of Parliament for the constituency until 1984. However in an election rally, Howe disparaged Chiam on his professional competence and was subsequently sued by Chiam for defamation. Howe offered compensation which Chiam accepted and dropped the case against him.

Howe relinquished his defence post to become the Minister for Health from 1982 to 1984. There, Howe became best remembered by Singaporeans for his controversial proposal in 1984 to raise the age for the withdrawal of Central Provident Fund (CPF) savings from 55 to 60 years. At a news conference on 26 March 1984, Howe reasoned that Singaporeans could not depend only on their children in their old age. That suggestion, part of the 54-page report of the Committee on the Problems of the Aged which he chaired, was eventually dropped. However, the report that took 20 months to finalise remains an important document with its forward-looking strategies to support Singapore's greying population. Taking up the suggestions in the report, the Singapore Government subsequently introduced the Minimum Sum scheme. This allows workers to withdraw some of their CPF funds at age 55, setting aside a certain minimum sum which can only be withdrawn at retirement age, currently at 62 years. To encourage the employment of aged workers, the CPF contribution rates for both employer and the aged employee were cut in July 1988. In 1993, the government raised the retirement age to 60.

Howe did not contest the general election in 1984. As a result of Howe's controversial report, the PAP lost 12% of the overall votes in that election, and lost the Potong Pasir ward to Chiam. Howe retired from politics that year.

In a letter of appreciation to Howe on his retirement, the then Prime Minister Lee Kuan Yew said he was indebted to Howe for the devoted work he had put in for the people. Lee also predicted that when workers in their 20s and 30s reached their 60s, they would see how difficult it was for children to stretch their salaries to support aged parents. They would then be grateful to Howe for the furore he had stirred by the report on the problems of the aged.

== Business career ==
After leaving politics, Howe returned to DBS as chairman and CEO from 1985 to 1990.

From 1992 to 2000, he was the executive chairman of Great Eastern Life Assurance, and from 1992 to 2007 the president and CEO for The Straits Holding Company, an investment holding firm. He was also chairman of the Rendezvous Hotel Singapore and Rendezvous Hotels & Resorts International.

== Personal life ==
Howe was married to Wan Fook Yin. They had three children; two sons, Tet Sen and Tze Sen and a daughter, Hwee Siew and two grandchildren at the time of his death.

On 21 August 2007, Howe died in Singapore from a stroke after having been hospitalised for three weeks. Several of Singapore's leaders, including Prime Ministers Lee Kuan Yew, Goh Chok Tong and Lee Hsien Loong, attended Howe's wake. Howe's funeral was held at Mandai Crematorium on 24 August 2007.

== Honours ==
In 1963, Howe received a Malaysia Medal and a Pingat Jasa Gemilang. For his contributions to Singapore, Howe was awarded a Distinguished Service Order in 1968. In 1971, the National University of Singapore awarded him with the honorary doctorate.

Howe was also an Honorary Fellow of the Academy of Medicine, Singapore, and an Honorary Life Member of the Young Men's Christian Association of Singapore.

== Bibliography ==
- Tommy Koh (2006). Singapore: The Encyclopedia. Singapore: Editions Didier Millet in association with the National Heritage Board. ISBN 981-4155-63-2.
- "Howe Yoon Chong 1923–2007". Today. 22 August 2007. p. 1.
- Li Xueying (23 August 2007). "He left his mark on today's top leaders". The Straits Times. p. H7.

Political offices
Preceded by Goh Keng Swee	Minister for Defence; 1979–1982	Succeeded by Goh Chok Tong
Preceded by Toh Chin Chye	Minister for Health; 1982–1984	Succeeded by Richard Hu Tsu Tau
