= The Seven Sisters of India (book) =

2001 book by Aglaja Stirn and Peter Van Ham

- The cover page of the book
- Author: Aglaja Stirn; Peter Van Ham
- Language: English
- Subject: Ethnicity, Culture, Tradition and Geography
- Publisher: Prestel Publishing
- Publication date: 4 October 2000
- Publication place: Assam, India
- Media type: Print (Hardcover)
- Pages: 167
- ISBN: 978-3-7913-2399-2

The Seven Sisters of India: Tribal Worlds Between Tibet and Burma is a book by Aglaja Stirn and Peter Van Ham and published by Prestel Publishing in 2001. The book is the first comprehensive publication on India's remote northeast, but also includes information on Tibet and Myanmar (Burma), in addition to the North Eastern states of India. The text focuses on ancient rituals that continue to influence everyday life in these more obscure regions, which may be less well known to western audiences. The text features a number high-quality color photographs.

The book contains individual chapters covering matriarchal tribal structures, daily life, religious rituals and fertility rites, varied geographies, ancestor worship, sun and moon cults, the arts of weaving and dance, and the headhunting practices that prevailed in this region until 50 years ago.
