= Property Report =

Property Report is an English language magazine and website brand started in Thailand in April 2004 by the company Ensign Media from its offices in Bangkok and Phuket.

== History ==
The magazine originally launched as Asia Property Report, a bi-monthly 16-page staple bound publication with a newspaper style layout aimed at the real estate industry throughout Asia.

Within two issues, the title changed to Thailand Property Report and the readership focus shifted to investors as the company's expatriate British founders, Terry Blackburn and Duncan Worthington, sought to capitalize on interest in the booming resort and luxury condominium real estate market in Thailand at the time. The local property market had remained stagnant since the 1997 Asian financial crisis, but went through a period of unprecedented growth between 2004–2008. During this time, the magazine grew to be a 126-page, perfect bound publication, became the best selling real estate magazine in the country and expanded its distribution to Hong Kong and Singapore, to take advantage of local interest in luxury Thai property. Due to local publication licensing laws the magazine was renamed Property Report Thailand in 2006.

In 2007, Ensign Media opened an office in Singapore in order to launch a sister magazine to Property Report Thailand, Property Report Singapore, Malaysia, Indonesia. The publication's primary areas of focus were Singapore, Kuala Lumpur, Bali, Penang and Jakarta. Whilst the publisher reported strong subscriber numbers and newsstand sales, the magazine never attracted the same number of advertising pages as Property Report Thailand, meaning its page count was always around 50% of its more established sibling publication. Plans to launch a Singapore Property Awards were announced but then shelved during the 2008 financial crisis.

In June 2010, Ensign merged Property Report Thailand and Property Report Singapore, Malaysia Indonesia into a single publication, Property Report South East Asia. The magazine was distributed in five countries: Singapore, Malaysia, Indonesia, Thailand and Hong Kong with a claimed circulation of 25,000 copies and was South East Asia’s only monthly real estate publication. Its editor in chief was UK national Andrew Batt, who was previously managing editor of Bloomberg Businessweek Thailand.

== Property Report.com ==
In 2005, propertyreport.com was launched under the original magazine branding of Asia Property Report Online and widened the editorial reach of the magazine to cover residential real estate throughout Asia, as well as carrying property and business listings. The website's most recent redesign was in July 2010, when it scrapped many of its superfluous sections and features to become more opinion, analysis and feature focused, and debuted a new property search engine and villa rental section.

== Thailand Property Awards ==
In 2006, Ensign held the inaugural Thailand Property Awards, to recognize achievements in residential real estate. In order to avoid accusations of favoritism towards advertisers, the organizers used a panel of independent judges and monitoring of the process by auditing firm BDO Advisory Whilst this occasionally produced controversial results, the awards continued to grow over the years and attracted over 500 attendees to the November 2010 gala dinner and considerable local and international media coverage for winners

In November 2010, Ensign Media announced plans for the South East Asia Property Awards to be held in Singapore in 2011.

== Distribution ==
Property Report is available for sale in major English language bookstores throughout Thailand, including Asia Books, Kinokuniya and Bookazine. Complimentary copies can also be found in five star hotels, airport business lounges and at the Emirates gate service at Bangkok International Airport. Property Report is also available by subscription
