= Perakian Malays =

Group of Malay people

Perakian Malay people Oghang Peghak / Oghang Peghok Melayu Perak / ملايو ﭬﻴـراق
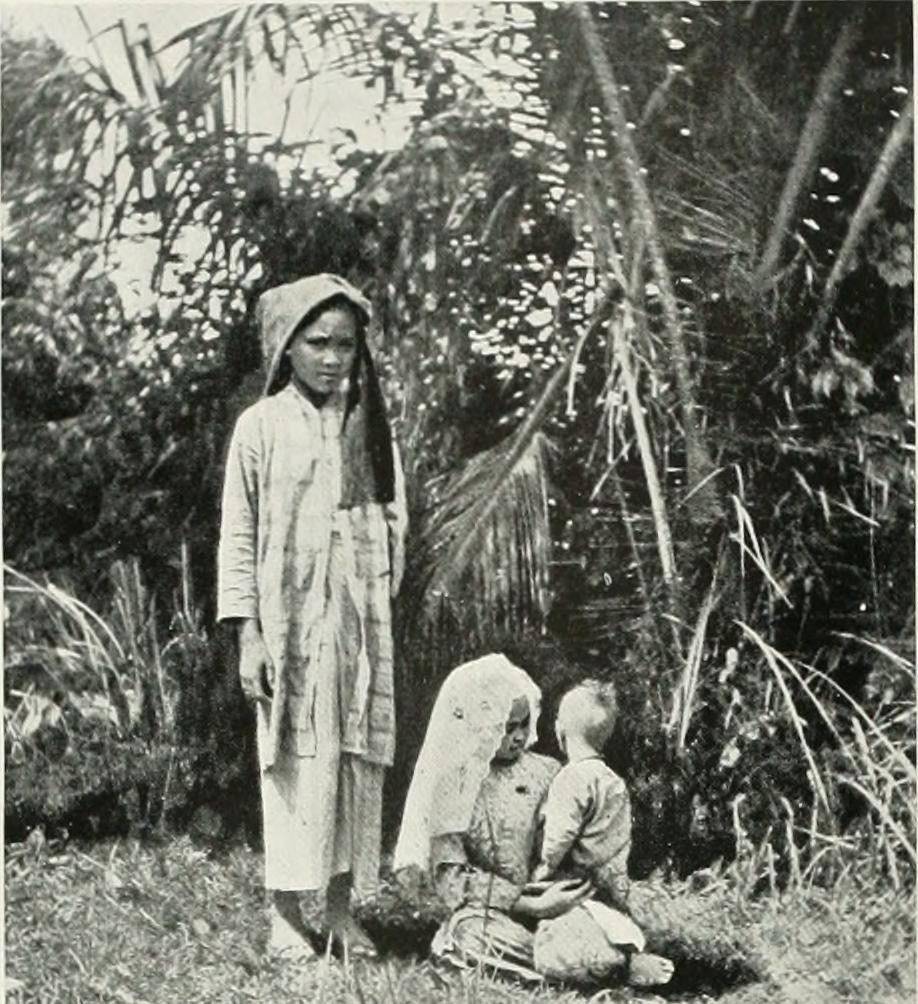
- A Perakian Malay woman with children in traditional attire, 1908.

Total population
- 1,249,000

Regions with significant populations
- Malaysia (Perak)

Languages
- Perak Malay, Malaysian language.

Religion
- Islam

Related ethnic groups
- Kedahan Malays, other Malaysian Malays

Perakian Malay people refers to a group of Malay people originating from the Malaysian state of Perak. As of 2010, it is estimated that the population of the Perakian Malays in Perak are about 55.74% of the state's population.

== Language ==
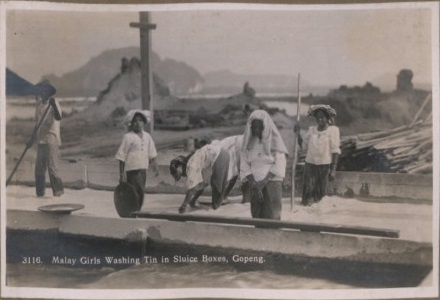
Malay women dressed in traditional Perakian Malay attire washing tin in sluice boxes, Gopeng, Perak, 1924.

Perakian Malays uses a distinct form of Malay variant known as Perak Malay. Linguistically, there are about five Malay dialects traditionally spoken in Perak, only one of which is intended by the name "Perak Malay" and it can be divided into two sub-dialects namely Perak Tengah sub-dialect and Kuala Kangsar sub-dialect. Other Malay dialects used in Perak include Perak Selatan dialect which is more influenced by Selangor Malay and Perak Ulu Malay dialect (also known as Basa Ulu or Basa Grik) but are not considered as part of Perak Malay as they do not share many similarities with Perak Malay but instead it is linguistically much closer to neighbouring Kelantan-Pattani Malay and other East Coast Malay varieties such as Terengganu Malay and Pahang Malay. Malaysian language is used as a second language and English as a third language.

== Culture ==
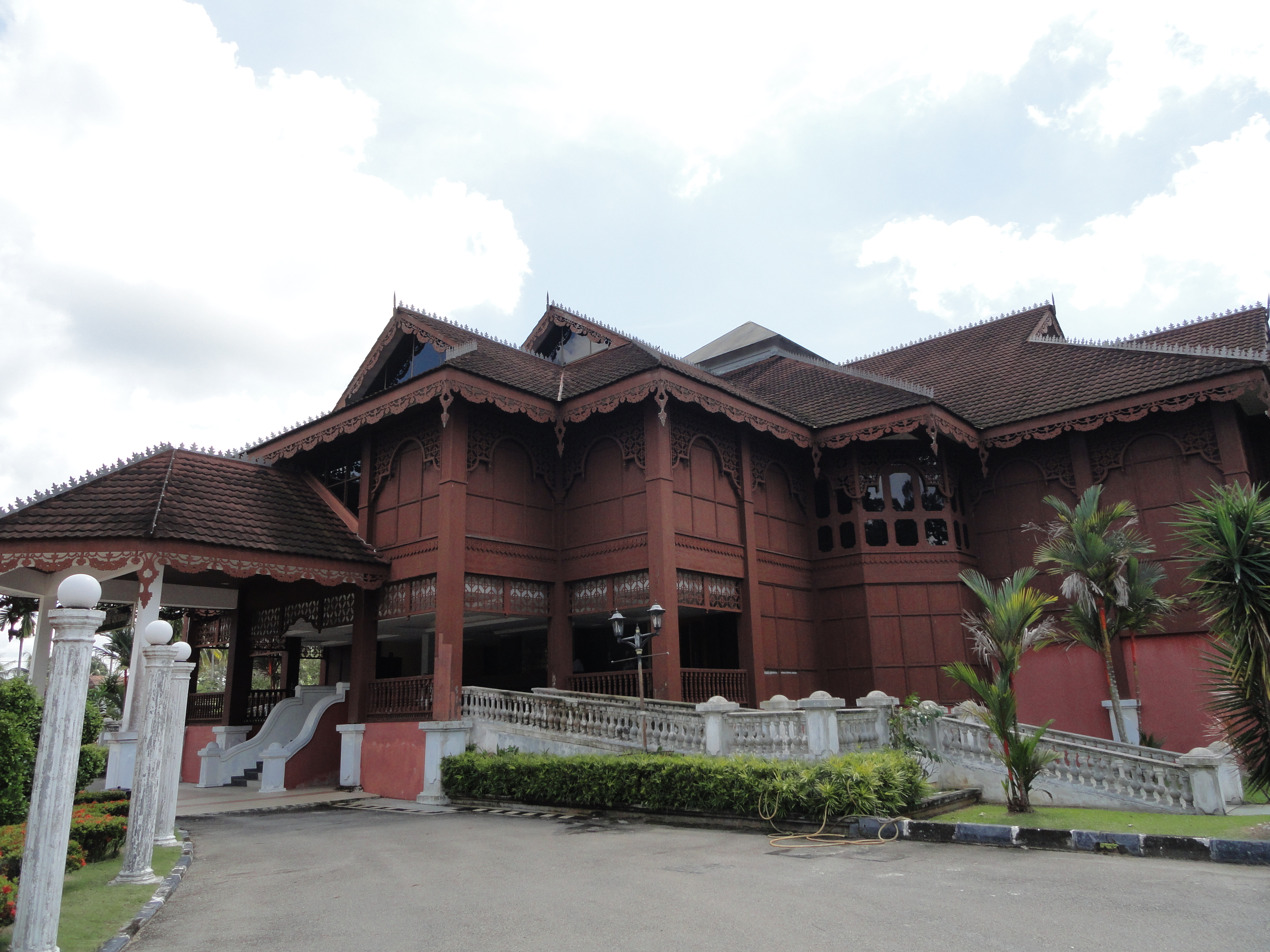
Traditional Malay house in Perak, Malaysia.

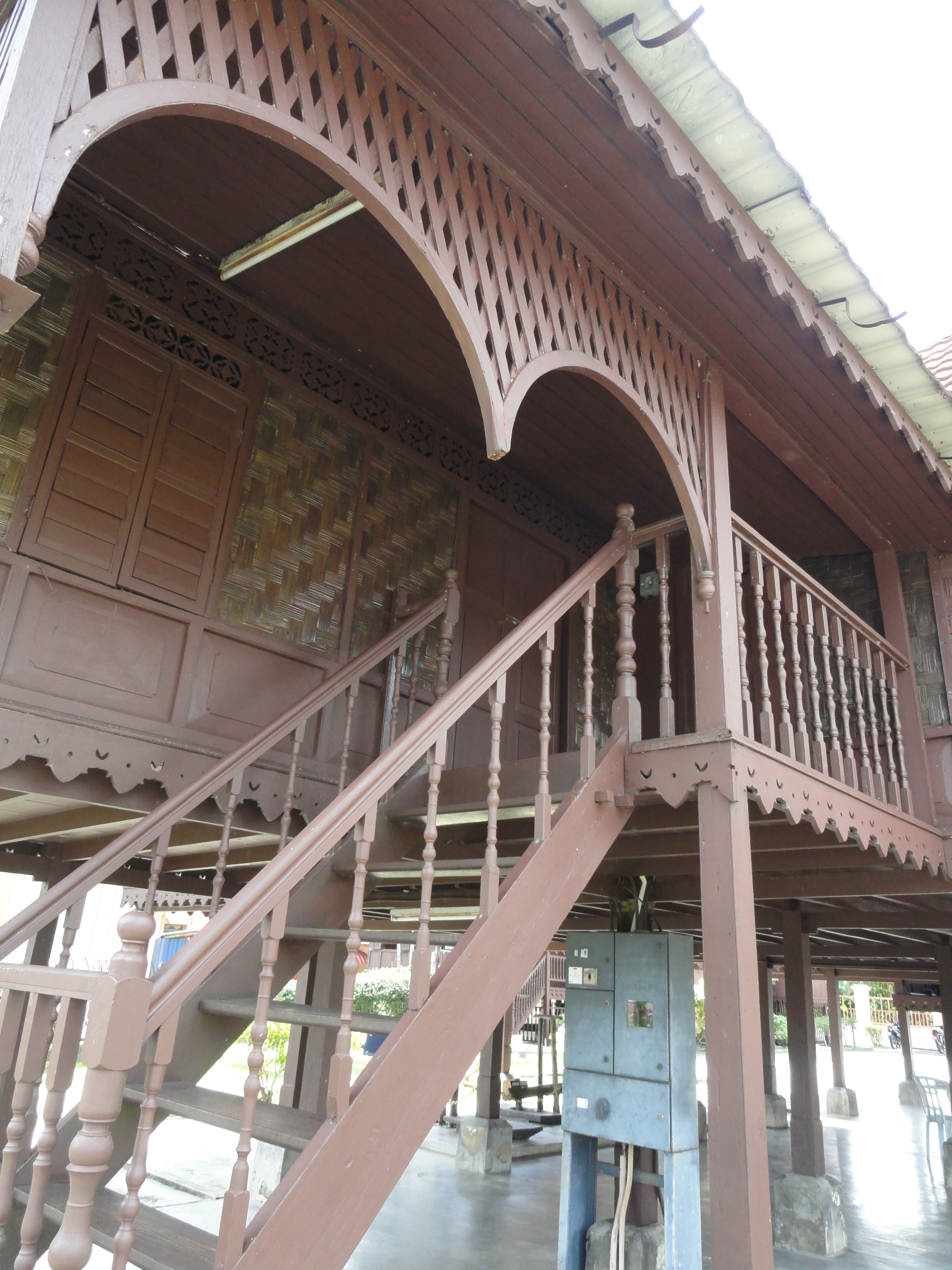
Traditional Malay house architecture in Perak, Malaysia.

=== Dance ===
Traditional Perakian Malay dance include:

- Dabus
- Bubu Menari
- Lenggok
- Zapin Gambus
- Belotah
- Sewang

=== Cuisine ===
- Ikan Pindang Daun Seniar
- Sambal Serai
- Gulai Kemahang
- Kerabu Umbut Bayas
- Kulat Sisir
- Penjan Ubi

=== Martial arts ===
- Silat Serimau Hitam

== Notable people ==
- Abdullah Muhammad Shah II of Perak, the 26th Sultan of Perak and resistor of colonial British Malaya.
- Ahmad Zahid Hamidi, Malaysia's Deputy Prime Minister.
- Amy Mastura, Malaysian singer and actress.
- Awie, Malaysian singer and actor.
- Fauziah Latiff, Malaysian actress.
- Jamal Abdillah, Malaysian singer and actor.
- Jins Shamsuddin, Malaysian actor and film director.
- Mamat Khalid, Malaysian film director.
- Mohammad Nizar Jamaluddin, politician and former Menteri Besar of Perak.
- Mohd Nasir Basharuddin, Malaysian footballer.
- Ngah Ibrahim, Orang Kaya Mantri of Larut in 1858.
- Mohammad Nor Khalid, a Malaysian cartoonist famously known as Lat
- Nazirul Naim Che Hashim, Malaysian footballer.
- Nurridzuan Abu Hassan, Malaysian footballer.
- Syazwan Roslan, Malaysian footballer.
