= Gangga Melayu =

Writing system used for several Austronesian languages

Gangga Melayu توليسن ڬڠڬا ملايو Tulisan Gangga Melayu Hurup Ganga Malayu Tulisan Gangga Malaya توليسن ڬڠڬا ملايا
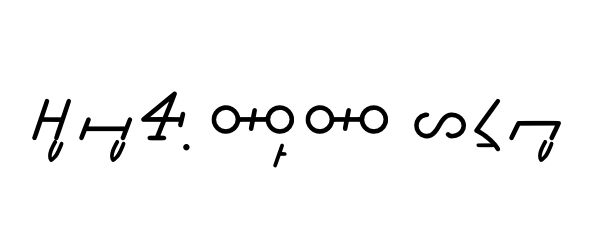
- The Gangga Malay script is believed to have originated from the Gangga Negara kingdom, which was an ancient Malay kingdom that existed in the 2nd century
- Script type: Abugida
- Period: c. 2nd century – Late 20th century
- Direction: Left-to-right
- Region: Malaysia: Perak
- Languages: Old Malay, Perak Malay, Standard Malay

Related scripts
- Parent systems: Egyptian hieroglyphs: Proto-Sinaitic; Phoenician; Aramaic; Tamil-Brahmi; Pallava; Gangga Melayu
- Child systems: Standard Jawi script
- Sister systems: Jawi script; Kawi script; Balinese; Batak script; Baybayin scripts; Javanese script; Lontara script; Makasar script; Rencong script; Rejang script; Sundanese script; Sasak script

Gangga Melayu (Jawi Script: توليسن ڬڠڬا ملايو, Malay: Tulisan Gangga Melayu, Perak Malay: Hurup Ganga Malayu) is a Cipher script and an Abugida that was used to write the Malay and Perak Malay languages in Perak until the 20th century. The writing was previously used to inscribe chiri, the traditional coronation formula of the Malay kings of Perak. The writing system is distinctive in that it incorporates both Abjad (Jawi) and Abugida (Brahmic) features. Since 2011, plans have been in place to introduce the script into its own Unicode.

== History ==
The origin of the Gangga Melayu script is still unknown. However, there is a view that the letters in this script are a modified form of the Arabic script used to write the Malay language. R. A. Kern wrote:

The greater part can be traced back to the usual characters, being reversions of these in a vertical or horizontal direction, and by the replacing of the dots by short strokes variously attached to the character that forms the basis of the several letters, which are differentiated in the ordinary writing by the number of dots employed in each case.

Although the form of the characters may have been derived from Arabic script, the structure of the Gangga Melayu script appears to be based on the Brahmi model, with some features adapted from other writing systems such as Javanese. In fact, Blagden suggests that some of the basic elements of this writing may date back to very early times and possibly existed before the advent of Islam.

According to C. O. Blagden, this script was used in the Malay Peninsula at least until the early 20th century and is described as a “cipher script” or “secret writing” In A Dictionary of the Malay Language (1894), Gangga Malayu is described as “the name of an alphabet used in Pêrak, but of modern origin and used only for purposes of secrecy.”

== Writing System ==
The Gangga Malayu writing system has its own distinctive characteristics, showing a combination of Arabic influence and the Brahmi writing tradition. The technical aspects and structure of the script can be described as follows.

Letters

Letter						
Name	Alif	Ba	Ta	Tha	Jim	Cha
Jawi	ا	ب	ت	ث	ج	چ
Letter						
Name	Ha	Kha	Dal	Zal	Ra	Ze
Jawi	ح	خ	د	ذ	ر	ز
Letter						
Name	Sin	Shin	Sod	Thod	Toh	Zoh
Jawi	س	ش	ص	ض	ط	ظ
Letter						
Name	Ain	Rhin	Nga	Pa	Kop	Kap
Jawi	ع	غ	ڠ	ف	ق	ک
Letter						
Name	Ga	Lam	Mim	Nun	Wau	Ha
Jawi	ݢ	ل	م	ن	و	ه
Letter						
Name	Ya	Nya				
Jawi	ي	ڽ				

Character Repertoire

There are a total of 52 characters, consisting of: 32 consonant letters, 3 vowel signs, 3 nasal signs, 1 gemination mark, 1 virama-like sign, 2 final consonant signs, and 10 numerals.

Character Names

Although the names of some characters may originate from Arabic and Javanese, the spelling conventions presented in Kern (1908) are used. For example, the spelling ALIF is used instead of the Arabic ALEF, and CHECHAQ is used instead of the Javanese CECAK.

Structure

The basic model of this writing system is based on Brahmi and uses a virama-like sign to indicate a bare consonant and consonant clusters. Each consonant letter carries an inherent vowel /a/. The phonological value of a consonant is the value of the corresponding Arabic letter plus the inherent vowel /a/. This inherent vowel is modified through the use of vowel signs and is suppressed using the JAZMA mark.

Writing Direction

This script is written from left to right.

Letter Connection: Each letter is written separately. There is no feature of connected writing between letters.

Virama

The JAZMA mark is used to suppress the inherent vowel of a consonant. It functions similarly to the virama in Indian scripts and appears to be graphically derived from the Arabic sukun. This mark is written explicitly and visibly.

Consonant Clusters

Consonant clusters are formed by marking the consonants without vowels using the JAZMA.

Vowels

Vowels are represented using combining marks. There are three vowel signs: SIGN AA, SIGN I, and SIGN U. These vowel marks are always written.

Diphthongs

The dependent form for the diphthong /ai/ is written as a combination of SIGN I, YA, and JAZMA.

Nasalization

There are three marks for nasalization: AN, IN, and UN. These marks appear to be based on Arabic tanwin.

Gemination

The TASHDID mark is used to indicate doubled consonants.

Final Consonants

There are two final consonant signs; believed to be borrowed from Javanese script:

The LAYAR sign represents the final consonant /r/ The CHECHAQ sign represents the final consonant /ŋ/

Numerals

The numerals represent decimal numbers:

0 (Sifar/Kosong), 1 (Satu), 2 (Dua), 3 (Tiga), 4 (Empat), 5 (Lima), 6 (Enam), 7 (Tujuh), 8 (Lapan), 9 (Sembilan)

Punctuation

No specific punctuation marks for this writing system have been identified
