= GeraNova Bruckmann =

German publishing house

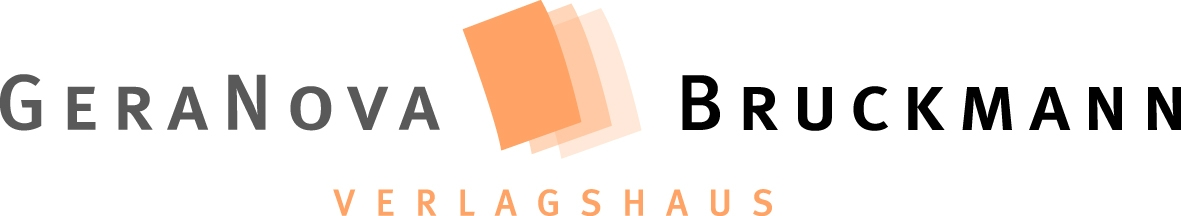
- Industry: Publishing house
- Founded: 2003; 22 years ago
- Headquarters: Munich, Germany
- Key people: Clemens Schüssler, Clemens Hahn and Hans-Joachim Hartmann
- Website: www.verlagshaus.de

The GeraNova Bruckmann is a German publishing house, based in Munich. Managers are Clemens Schüssler, Clemens Hahn and Hans-Joachim Hartmann.

== History ==
In 2003, publishers Bruckmann and GeraNova (today GeraMond) were united under the same roof as the GeraNova Bruckmann publishing house. In 2004 the C.J. Bucher Verlag (now Bucher Verlag) and the J. Berg Verlag were added. In June 2008, the publishing house GeraNova Bruckmann took over the two publishers Christian Verlag and Frederking & Thaler from Prestel Publishing.

From 2009 to 2015, GeraNova Bruckmann published together with the Gong Verlag the magazine Landidee (Country ideas), Landidee Wohnen & Deko (Country ideas Living & Décor), Landapotheke (Country Pharmacy), Landfrisch (Country Fresh), Landgarten (Country Garden) and thematic recipe booklets. Between 2012 and 2015; GeraNova Bruckman together with Gong Verlag the magazines Ein Herz für Tiere (A heart for animals) and their Dutch edition Hart voor Dieren, as well as, Partner Hund (Partner dog), Geliebte Katze (Beloved cat), Dogstoday, Catstoday and monothematic magazine extras for topics related to dogs or cats. In July 2015, Funke Mediengruppe took over Landidee publications completely and the GeraNova Bruckmann publishing house claimed the Ein Herz für Tiere publications 100% its own.

In November 2013, the publishing house took over the home improvement magazine, Selbermachen from Jahreszeiten-Verlag, Hamburg. Therefore, the Hamburg-based Selbermachen Media GmbH was founded as a 100 percent subsidiary.

In January 2014, GeraNova Bruckmann took over Sutton Publishing in Erfurt and in October 2014, the Alba publication Alf Teloeken with the magazines, Eisenbahn-Magazin ('Railroad magazine) and N-Bahn-Magazine (N train magazine).

In April 2016, National Geographic Germany and GeraNova Bruckmann founded NG Publishing. The Piper Verlag resigned from the recent joint venture with National Geographic Germany.

== Program ==
GeraNova Bruckmann publishes books, magazines, calendars, DVDs, online portals, e-books and apps on the topics of Tourism, Outdoor and Sport (Bruckmann Verlag), nature, culture and photography (Frederking & Thaler Verlag), history (Bucher Verlag), activities guide, illustrated books and monographs on topics from Bavaria, the Alpine region and the neighboring regions and countries (J. Berg Verlag) as well as, automotive, motorcycle, train, model, transport, aviation and military history (GeraMond Verlag).
