= Encyclopedia of Malaysia =

The Encyclopedia of Malaysia
- The Encyclopedia of Malaysia 12: People and Traditions
- Author: Over 400 people
- Publisher: Editions Didier Millet
- Publication date: 1998–2007
- Publication place: Malaysia
- Media type: Hardback
- Pages: 144 per volume (152 for volume 11; 148 for volumes 12 and 13)

The Encyclopedia of Malaysia is a multi-volume encyclopedia about Malaysia. Each volume deals with a single subject area and is composed of thematic, double-page spreads. Over 400 authors, mainly Malaysians, have contributed to the series. The patron of The Encyclopedia of Malaysia is Mahathir Mohamad.

== History ==
In 1998, first five volumes were launched by Dato' Seri Mohd. Najib bin Tun Haji Abdul Razak who was then the Minister of Education in Malaysia. Volumes 6 and 7 were launched in 2001 by the Sultan of Selangor (at that time the Regent of Selangor).

Volumes 8 and 9 were launched by Dato' Seri Utama Rais Yatim, Minister of Culture, Arts and Heritage, in 2004. Volume 10 was launched by Dato' Abdullah bin Md Zin, Minister in the Prime Minister's Department for Religious Affairs, in December 2005.

On 29 August 2006, volume 11 was launched by Dato' Sri Mohd Najib Tun Abdul Razak, the Deputy Prime Minister of Malaysia at that time.

== Published ==
1. The Environment ISBN 981-3018-39-9 (Volume editor: Prof. Dato' Dr Sham Sani)
2. Plants ISBN 981-3018-40-2 (Volume editor: Dr E. Soepadmo)
3. Animals ISBN 981-3018-41-0 (Volume editor: Prof. Dr Yong Hoi Sen)
4. Early History ISBN 981-3018-42-9 (Volume editor: Prof. Dato' Dr Nik Hassan Shuhaimi)
5. Architecture ISBN 981-3018-43-7 (Volume editor: Chen Voon Fee)
6. The Seas ISBN 981-3018-45-3 (Volume editors: Prof. Dr Ong Jin Eong and Prof. Dr Gong Wooi Khoon)
7. Early Modern History ISBN 981-3018-47-X (Volume editor: Prof. Dr Cheah Boon Kheng)
8. Performing Arts ISBN 981-3018-56-9 (Volume editor: Prof. Dr Ghulam-Sarwar Yousof)
9. Languages and Literature ISBN 981-3018-52-6 (Volume editor: Prof. Dato' Dr Asmah Haji Omar)
10. Religions and Beliefs ISBN 981-3018-51-8 (Volume editors: Prof. Dr M. Kamal Hassan and Dr Ghazali bin Basri)
11. Government and Politics ISBN 981-3018-55-0 (Volume editor: Prof. Dato' Dr Zakaria Haji Ahmad)
12. Peoples and Traditions ISBN 981-3018-53-4 (Volume editor: Prof. Dato' Dr Hood Salleh)
13. The Economy ISBN 978-981-3018-44-0 (Volume editor: Prof. Dr H. Osman Rani)
14. Crafts and the Visual Arts ISBN 978-981-3018-57-0 (Volume editor: Datuk Syed Ahmad Jamal)
15. Sports and Recreation ISBN 978-981-4155-61-8 (Volume editor: Tan Sri Dato' Seri (Dr) Ahmad Sarji bin Abdul Hamid)
16. The Rulers of Malaysia ISBN 978-981-3018-54-9 (Volume editors: Datuk Prof. Emeritus Dr Mohd Taib Osman and Prof. Emeritus Dato' Dr Khoo Kay Kim)
