= Christian Verlag =

German publishing house

- Founded: 1947
- Country of origin: Germany
- Headquarters location: Munich
- Key people: Clemens Schüssler, Hans-Joachim Hartmann
- Official website: christian-verlag.de

The Christian Verlag is a German publishing house, based in Munich. The publishing house belongs to GeraNova Bruckmann publishing house since 2008. Managers are Clemens Schüssler and Hans-Joachim Hartmann.

== History ==
The Christian Verlag was founded in 1947 in Bad Nauheim. From 1978 it became part of the Time Life Books Group and the program priorities developed more towards enjoyment and lifestyle themes.

From 2001 until 2008 the publishing house belonged to Prestel Publishing Group.

Since summer 2008 it belongs to the publishing house GeraNova Bruckmann. Christian Verlag already received awards from the French organization World Cookbook and the medal from the Gastronomische Akademie Deutschlands (Gastronomic Academy Germany). In 2012, Die vegetarische Kochschule by Christl Kurz was awarded with the Gourmand World Cookbook Awards in the vegetarian cooking category, and in 2013, Die venezianische Küche from Russell Norman won in the category "Italian". From 2009 to 2015, Christian Verlag published in cooperation with the Gong publishing the magazines LandIdee, LandIdee Wohnen&Deko, LandApotheke, LandFrisch and LandGarten.

In addition to its emphasis on cooking and gardening, as well as, home and lifestyle, the publisher is also the publisher of restaurant and wine guide Gault Millau.

As of September 1, 2018, Christian Verlag took over the book program of Christophorus Verlag from OZ Verlag, thus expanding its book program to include the advice-based creative segment (including handicrafts, crafts, creative design, art and decorating).
