= Perak Malay =

Malayic language dialect

- Bahasa Melayu Perak بهاس ملايو ڤيراق
- Bahase Peghok; Ngelabun Peghok
- Native to: Malaysia
- Region: Perak
- Ethnicity: Perakian Malays
- Native speakers: 1.4 million (2010 census)
- Language family: Austronesian: Malayo-Polynesian; (disputed); Malayic; Perak Malay
- Dialects: Kuala Kangsar; Perak Tengah
- Writing system: Latin (Malay alphabet); Arabic (Jawi); Gangga Malayu

Language codes
- ISO 639-3: –
- Glottolog: pera1260

Perak Malay (Bahase Peghok or Ngelabun Peghok; Standard Malay: bahasa Melayu Perak; Jawi script: بهاس ملايو ڤيراق) is one of the Malay dialects spoken within the state of Perak, Malaysia. Although it is neither the official language nor the standard dialect in the whole state of Perak, its existence which co-exists with other major dialects in the state of Perak still plays an important role in maintaining the identity of Perak. In spite of the fact that there are five main dialects traditionally spoken in Perak, only one of which is intended by the name "Perak Malay". There are subtle phonetic, syntactic and lexical distinctions from other major Malay dialects. Perak Malay can be divided into two sub-dialects, Kuala Kangsar and Perak Tengah, named after the daerah (districts) where they are predominantly spoken.

== Classification ==
Linguistically, the Malay dialects spoken in the state of Perak are diverse. In fact, there is still no definite classification of the type of Malay dialects used in Perak. Ismail Hussein (1973) classified the Malay dialects in Perak into five types segregated into five different areas. While Harun Mat Piah (1983) categorized them into six. Although Asmah Haji Omar (1985) divided the Malay dialects in Perak into five types, the specifications of the division did not coincide with that of Ismail's.

== Distribution ==
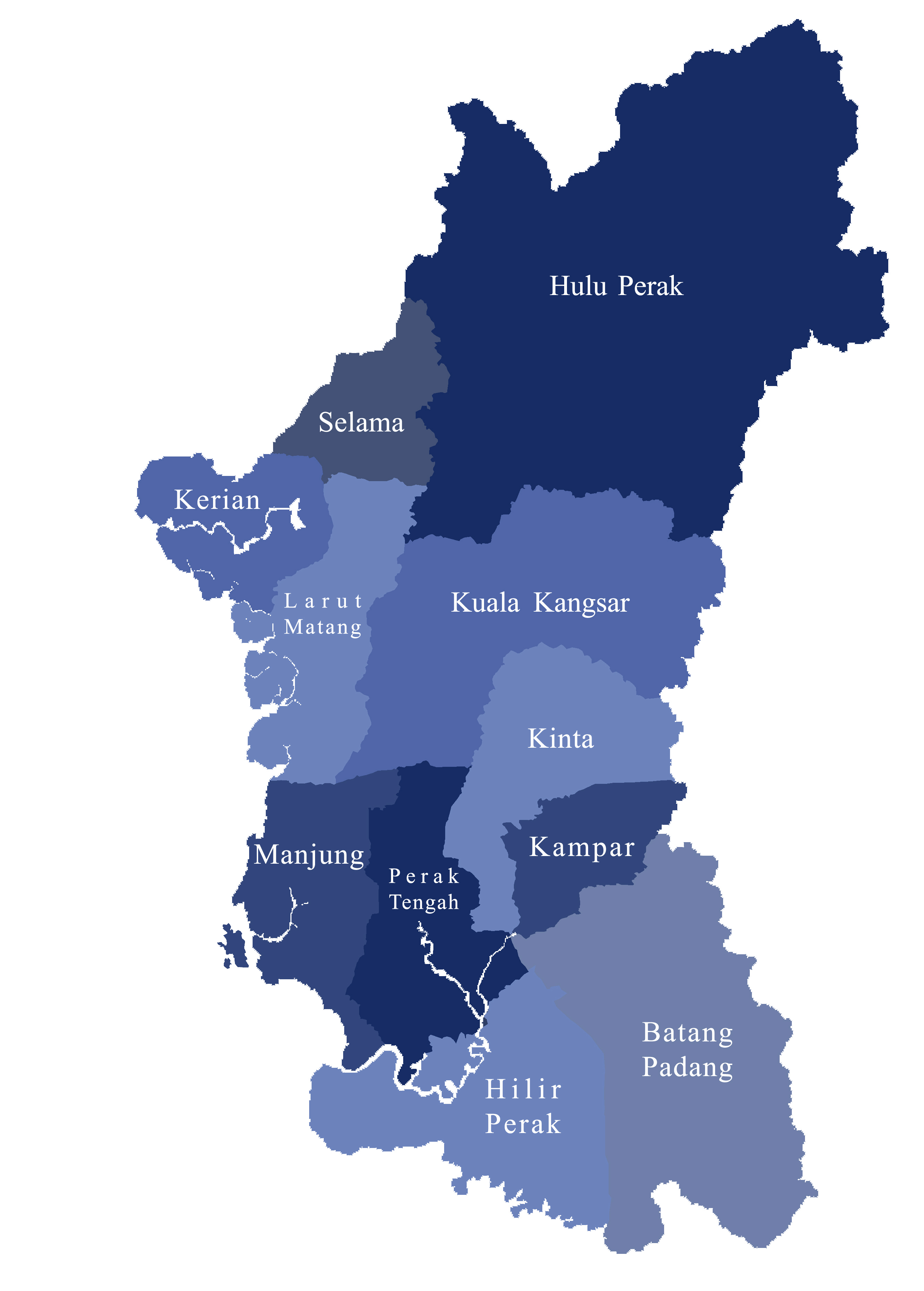
Daerah (districts) in Perak

Perak Malay is spoken throughout the whole state except in the northwestern parts of Perak (Kerian, Larut, Matang and Selama), and a few parts of Manjung district including Pangkor Island where the northern dialect is predominantly spoken.

In the northeastern part of Perak (Hulu Perak) and some parts of Selama and Kerian, the Malay people natively speak a distinct variant of Malay language which is most closely related to Kelantan-Pattani Malay and the Malay dialects of southern Thailand due to geographical borders and historical assimilation. This variant is occasionally classified as a sub-dialect of Yawi. The district of Hulu Perak once was ruled by the Kingdom of Reman. Reman was historically a part of Greater Pattani (which is now a province of Thailand) before gaining independence in 1810 from the Pattani Kingdom via a rebellion by the Royal Family.

In the southern parts of Perak (Hilir Perak and Batang Padang) and also in the districts of Kampar and Kinta and several parts of Manjung, the dialect is heavily influenced by southern Malay dialects of the peninsula such as Selangor, Malacca and Johore-Riau Malay and various languages of Indonesian archipelago namely Javanese, Banjar, Rawa, Mandailing and Buginese as a result of historical immigration, civil war such as Klang War and other inevitable factors.

Whilst there are many Malay dialects significantly found in Perak, all Malay dialectologists basically agreed that Perak Malay is spoken by the native Malay people who traditionally have long been subsisting along the riverine system of Perak which comprises Perak River valley and its vicinity except those at the upper stream. Historically, it was a tradition for the Malay peasants in Perak to settle along the Perak River. Royal residences also were built at various sites along the river basin, and there was never any attempt to move to another tributary.

== Characteristics ==
=== Phonology ===
==== Open final syllables ====
It has been said that in general, the Malay people in Malaya distinguish the dialect of Perak by the final /-a/ vowel in Standard Malay substituted into strong 'e': [-ɛ], in contrast to [-o], [-ɔ], [-ɑ] and [-ə] in the other Malay dialects, similar to inland Terengganu dialect. So as for the word mata (eye) which is shown by the phonemes /mata/ in Standard Malay, is pronounced as [matɛ] in Perak Malay notably in central Perak region. It appears that Perak Malay has a vowel raising rule which changes word final /-a/ vowel of Standard Malay to [-ɛ].

Word	Standard Malay	Perak Malay		Meaning
Word	Standard Malay	Perak Tengah	Kuala Kangsar	Meaning
Bota بوتا	/bota/	[botɛ]	[botə]	Bota (a town in Perak)
mata مات	/mata/	[matɛ]	[matə]	eye
kita كيت	/kita/	[kitɛ]	[kitə]	we, us, our (inclusive)
rupa روڤـا	/rupa/	[ʁopɛ]	[ʁopə]	look (noun)
kena كنا	/kəna/	[kənɛ]	[kənə]	to be subject to (passive voice), to contact with
kereta كريتا	/kəreta/	[kəʁetɛ]	[kəʁetə]	car, cart

Exception of this rule occurs for some words as shown in the table below. This exception is regarded as common amongst most Malay dialects in the peninsula.

Word	Standard Malay	Perak Malay	Meaning
Kinta كينتا	/kinta/	[kinta]	Kinta (a district in Perak)
merdeka مرديـک	/mərdeka/	[məɾdeka]	independent
bola بولا	/bola/	[bola]	ball
beca بيچـا	/betʃa/	[betʃa]	trishaw
lawa لاوا	/lawa/	[lawɐ~o]	pretty, good
maha مها	/maha/	[maha]	very (adj.), the most (superlative)

As the prevalence of Perak Malay, the diphthongs presented by the graphemes -ai and -au are often articulated as varied forms of monophthongs. Still and all, diphthongization of monophthongs occurs in certain conditions instead. For instance, the final vowels sound /-i/ and /-u/ are articulated to some extent as diphthongs [-iy] and [-uw] respectively. The monophthongization patterns phonetically vary by the sub-dialects.

Word	Standard Malay	Perak Malay		Meaning
Word	Standard Malay	Perak Tengah	Kuala Kangsar	Meaning
gulai ڬـولاي	/gulai̯/	[gulaː]	[gulɛʲ]	gulai (a traditional Malay cuisine)
kedai كداي	/kədai̯/	[kədaː]	[kədɛʲ]	shop, store (noun)
sampai سمـڤـاي	/sampai̯/	[sampaː]	[sampɛʲ]	to arrive (verb), until (prep. and conj.), as far as (adverb)
risau ريساو	/risau̯/	[ʁisaː]	[ʁisɔː]	to be worried
bangau باڠـاو	/baŋau̯/	[baŋaː]	[baŋɔː]	stork
limau ليماو	/limau̯/	[limaː]	[limɔː]	lime

The pattern /-ai̯/ transformed to [-aː] is particularly restricted to some areas within the district of Perak Tengah. Typically in most villages in Parit and southward to Bota, this pattern is applied. While in the sub-districts of Kampung Gajah and northward to Lambor, the speakers tend to utter in the similar form as in Kuala Kangsar sub-dialect.

==== Closed final syllables ====
There is a phonological rule in Perak Malay that neutralizes the final nasals to alveolar nasal. The final nasals /-m/ and /-ŋ/ phonetically exist in certain environments. In other circumstances, the nasals are neutralized to [-n]. This neutralizing rule operates only if the final nasals are directly preceded by /i/ or /e/. In addition, the [e] and [o] are allophones of /i/ and /u/ in closed final syllables in general Malaysian phonology.

Word	Standard Malay	Perak Malay	Meaning
Taiping تايـڤـيـڠ	/taipiŋ/	[tɛpen]	Taiping (a sub-district in Perak)
kering كريـڠ	/kəriŋ/	[kəʁen]	dry
bengkeng بيـڠـكيـڠ	/beŋkeŋ/	[bɛŋken]	fierce, livery, pugnacious
kirim كيريم	/kirim/	[keʁen]	to send, to post
musim موسيم	/musim/	[musen]	season
alim عاليم	/alim/	[alen]	pious

==== Rhoticity ====
Most of Malay dialects particularly in Malaysia are non-rhotic. Perak Malay is one of non-rhotic variants of Malay language and the 'r' is guttural. In Perak Malay, if the 'r' appears in the initial and middle position of a word, it will be pronounced as French 'r' specifically voiced uvular fricative, [ʁ] but if it comes in the final position of a word and in a postvocalic setting, it will be dropped or deleted and then substituted into an open vowel; usually 'o' by affecting the open vowel preceding it.

=== Vocabulary ===
==== Personal pronouns ====
Perak Malay differs lexically from Standard Malay for some personal pronouns. The suffix '-me' indicates plural pronoun. Possibly '-me' is derived from the word semua that means 'all' in Malay.

Perak Malay Personal Pronouns
Type of pronoun		Perak Malay	Meaning
First person	Singular	teman (general), awok (intimate), keme (familiar), aye (very polite), aku (informal)	I, me
First person	Plural	keme (general), kume*, temanme (rare)	we, us: they and me, s/he and me (exclusive)
First person	Plural	kite	we, us: you and me, you and us (inclusive)
Second person	Singular	mike (general), kamu (familiar), kome (intimate)	you, thou, thee
Second person	Plural	kome (general), mikeme, mengkeme*, mengkome*	you, y'all
Third person	Singular	die/diye, deme (familiar)	he, she, him, her
Third person	Plural	deme (general), depe**	they, them

Notes:
* Kuala Kangsar variant
** Influence of the northern dialect

==== Intensifiers ====
Instead of using 'bebeno' or 'sangat' as intensifier for an adjective, Perak Malay speakers also use specific intensifiers for some adjectives.

Standard Malay	Perak Malay	Meaning
sangat putih	puteh melepok	very white
sangat hitam	itam bere/legam	very dark/black
sangat merah	meghåh menyale	very red
sangat busuk	busuk bango/melantong	very smelly
sangat manis	maneh meleten	very sweet
sangat tawar	tawo lesyo/besyo	very tasteless
sangat masam	masam meghutuk	very sour
sangat hangus	hangit pengit	very scorched
sangat terik	panah/paneh jantan	very hot (Sun)
sangat panas	hangat pijo	very hot
sangat sejuk	sejuk bedi	very cold
sangat kurus	kuruih merehek	very thin (body)

==== Animals ====
Perak Malay also differs phonetically and lexically from Standard Malay for some animals.

Standard Malay	Perak Malay	Meaning
anjing	anjen	dog
buaya	boye	crocodile
burung	boghong	bird
cacing	cacen	worm
cencurut	cencoghot	Malayan shrew
harimau	ghima/ghimo	tiger
ikan haruan/gabus	anåk maråk/meghåh, ikan bocat/bujuk, ikan bado	snakehead murrel
ikan temelian/tembelian	ikan temoleh	Probarbus jullieni
ikan tongkol	ikan kayu	Euthynnus affinis
kala jengking	kale lipit	scorpion
kambing	kamben	goat
kelekatu	mengkiok	winged caste of termite
kerbau	koba/keghobo	buffalo
kerengga	kongge/koghongge	weaver ant
kucing	kucen	cat
labi-labi	jelebo	softshell tortoise
pepatung/sesibur	cakcibo/cikcibo	dragonfly
pianggang	cenanga/cenango	Leptocoriza varicornis
semut api	semut gata/gatey	fire ant
ular	ulo	snake

==== Fruits and plants ====
Perak Malay has distinct names for specific fruits and plants. Some differ in pronunciation from Standard Malay.

Standard Malay	Perak Malay	Meaning
cili	caba/cabey	chili
cili padi/api	caba/cabey boghong	Bird's eye chili
durian	doyan/deghoyan	durian
durian belanda	doyan/deghoyan mekåh/meghokah	soursop
kabung	kanto	sugar palm
kedondong	amra	Spondias dulcis
kelapa	nyio	coconut
kerdas	geduåk/genuåk	Archidendron bubalinum
kuini	kuinen	fragrant mango
limau bali	lima/limo tambun	pomelo
mangga	pelam/mempelam	mango
manggis	manggeh	mangosteen
mencupu/cerapu	ceghopu	Garcinia prainiana
petai	peta/petey	Parkia speciosa
rambutan	mbutan/ghombutan	rambutan
tampoi	laghah	Baccaurea macrocarpa

== Bibliography ==
- Department of Statistics Malaysia (2010), Total population by ethnic group, mukim and state, Malaysia, 2010 - Perak (PDF), archived from the original (PDF) on 14 November 2012
- Asmah Omar (2008), Susur Galur Bahasa Melayu, Dewan Bahasa dan Pustaka, Kuala Lumpur, ISBN 978-9836-298-26-3
- S. Nathesan (2001), Makna dalam Bahasa Melayu, Dewan Bahasa dan Pustaka, Kuala Lumpur, ISBN 983-62-6889-8
- Cecilia Odé & Wim Stokhof (1997), Proceedings of the Seventh International Conference on Austronesian Linguistics, Rodopi B.V., Amsterdam - Atlanta, ISBN 90-420-0253-0
- Asmah Haji Omar (1991), Bahasa Melayu abad ke 16 : satu analisis berdasarkan teks Melayu 'Aqa'id al-Nasafi, Dewan Bahasa dan Pustaka, Kuala Lumpur
- Zaharani Ahmad (1991), The Phonology and Morphology of the Perak Dialect, Dewan Bahasa dan Pustaka, Kuala Lumpur
- Raja Mukhtaruddin bin Raja Mohd. Dain (1986), Dialek Perak, Yayasan Perak, Ipoh
- James T. Collins (1986), Antologi Kajian Dialek Melayu, Dewan Bahasa dan Pustaka, Kuala Lumpur
- Barbara Watson Andaya (1979), Perak, the Abode of Grace. A Study of an Eighteenth Century of Malay State, Oxford in Asia: Kuala Lumpur, ISBN 978-0-19-580385-3
- Asmah Hj. Omar (1977), Kepelbagaian Fonologi Dialek-Dialek Melayu, Dewan Bahasa dan Pustaka, Kuala Lumpur
- Charles Cuthbert Brown (1941), Perak Malay, The Federated Malay States Government Press, Kuala Lumpur
- John Frederick Adolphus McNair (1878), Perak and the Malays, Cornell University Library, New York, ISBN 978-1-4297-4312-9
