= Prestel Publishing =

German publisher

- Parent company: Penguin Random House
- Founded: 1924; 101 years ago
- Founder: Hermann Loeb
- Country of origin: Germany
- Headquarters location: Munich
- Distribution: self-distributed (Germany); Innovative Logistics (US fulfillment); Grantham Book Services (UK); Interart (France); Exhibitions International (Belgium); Peribo (Australia); Nationwide Book Distributors (New Zealand); Jacana Media (South Africa)
- Publication types: Books
- Nonfiction topics: art, architecture, photography and design
- Official website: prestel.de

Prestel Publishing is an art book publisher, with books on art, architecture, photography, design, fashion, craft, culture, history and ethnography. Lists range from museum guides, to encyclopaedias, art and architecture monographs to facsimile volumes and books for children.

Founded in 1924 by Hermann Loeb in Frankfurt, Germany, originally for the publication of old master prints, the company is named after Johann Gottlieb Prestel, the famous 18th-century German engraver.

Prestel has its head office in Munich, and a branch in London. It is owned by Penguin Random House.

== History ==
=== Inception and founding ===
In 1774 German engraver and painter Johann Gottlieb Prestel founded an art dealership in Nuremberg, which developed into an art gallery and was relocated to Frankfurt in 1783. At the end of the 19th century, one of his heirs converted the business into an auction house, which the antiquarian Albert Voigtländer-Tetzner acquired in 1910.

In the 1920s, Prestel Verlag was finally separated from the rest of the company. The art historian Hermann Loeb bought the publishing holdings and had Prestel-Verlags GmbH registered in the commercial register on 18 July 1924.

=== Nazi Germany and the war years ===
In 1933 the Nazis forced the Jewish Loeb to sell the publishing house to one of his employees. In exile in Switzerland, Loeb founded the Holbein Verlag, which worked closely with Prestel and also published works in his name. The Frankfurt parent company, whose new owner was also made an officer of the company, got into serious economic difficulties at the end of the 1930s. The business could only be maintained with the financial support of a paper wholesaler in Augsburg. As a result, Prestel Verlag was sold to Paul Capellmann, a lawyer from Aachen, who converted the company into a limited partnership based in Munich in 1940. The books stored in Leipzig and the office in Munich fell victim to the Second World War, and on 15 February 1945 the Reich Chamber of Culture closed Prestel Verlag.

=== Post-war revival and expansion ===
After the war, Capellmann and his wife resumed publishing in Gmund am Tegernsee. In 1946 typographer and printer Gustav Stresow was appointed head of Prestel Verlag. Hermann Loeb and others advised him on the reconstruction. Following Capellmann's death in 1947, his widow Georgett and Stresow took over the publishing house and expanded its production from books on drawings and prints to include painting, architecture, and photography. In 1950, Prestel Verlag left Gmund and moved into the premises of a printing company in Munich. After initial failures, Prestel developed under Stresow into an important publishing house for travel literature, art history, and fine arts. Stresow remained a company director until his death in July 2010.

In 1977, Jürgen Tesch joined the company as a shareholder and managing director. He established subsidiaries in London and New York City, and he also expanded the company's publishing to include architectural guides, exhibition catalogues, museum guides, and related materials. Tesch also started an English-language publishing program and set up distribution throughout the world. The company currently has over 1,000 books in print, with more than three-quarters in English.

In 1999 there was a change in the shareholder structure of the publishing house: The Frankfurter Allgemeine Zeitung (FAZ) took over the shares of Nadine Capellmann Biffar and Gina Capellmann Lütkemeier and part of the shares of Jürgen Tesch. Tesch initially retained a 40% stake in Prestel-Verlag GmbH & Co. as managing partner and responsible publisher. In early 2005, the FAZ also bought Tesch's remaining shares in Prestel Verlag.

=== 21st century: Acquisition by Random House ===
At the end of 2005, the Frankfurter Allgemeine Zeitung decided to part with most of its book publishers. Deutsche Verlags-Anstalt and the publishing houses Kösel-Verlag and Manesse Verlag were sold to the Random House publishing group, which belongs to Bertelsmann. Prestel and also participation in the dtv Verlagsgesellschaft initially remained with the FAZ.

In August 2006, the FAZ finally sold Prestel Verlag as well. The ownership shares were divided in three equal parts between Martin Dort and Johannes Heyne – who between them owned the publishing companies Christian Verlag and Frederking & Thaler – and Prestel's managing director Jürgen Krieger.

Random House bought Prestel in June 2008. Martin Dort and Johannes Heyne left the company, and Christian Verlag and Frederking & Thaler were sold to publishing house GeraNova Bruckmann.

Jürgen Krieger stayed on at Prestel as publisher. He pushed the internationalization of the publishing house; he separated the sales offices in London and New York City from the publishing house and separated them into small independent publishing units.

As part of the integration of Prestel into the Random House publishing group, Prestel-Verlag GmbH & Co. KG was deleted from the commercial register in 2009. Random House stated that Prestel should work largely independently under the umbrella of the publishing group.

In 2010, Christian Rieker took over the management of Prestel. He strengthened the children's books and gift books segments, and also steered the publishing house more towards "lifestyle topics". After having published the original catalog for the first documenta in 1955, Prestel worked with the Kassel art show again in 2017 by publishing the catalogs for documenta 14.

In 2020, Bertelsmann acquired full ownership of Penguin Random House and Random House's German operations were integrated into the company.
