= Singapore: The Encyclopedia =

Singapore is also one of the ASEAN countries

- Cover for Singapore: The Encyclopedia
- Editor: Tommy Koh (editor-in-chief) and others
- Author: 231 people, for the full list see NHB launch release, pages 4–9
- Publisher: Editions Didier Millet
- Publication date: 11 September 2006
- Publication place: Singapore
- Media type: Hardback
- Pages: 640
- ISBN: 981-4155-63-2

Singapore: The Encyclopedia is a 640-page encyclopedia about Singapore, covering its history, geography, arts and politics. It is jointly produced by the National Heritage Board and Editions Didier Millet . While the volume is not the first to focus exclusively on Singapore, it is claimed to be the most comprehensive work of its kind. The encyclopedia has 2,560 entries contributed by 231 experts from various fields, as well as 2,400 maps, photographs and illustrations, many of which are published for the first time. The production of the work took 24 months, and was sponsored by 36 organisations who donated S$1.3 million.

President S.R. Nathan launched the encyclopedia at the Istana on 11 September 2006 in conjunction with Singapore 2006. Within two days of the launch, half of the volume's initial print-run of 8,000 copies had been sold, despite costing S$75 each. 70% of the sales were over-the-counter transactions at bookshops; the rest were purchased by companies.
