= Asia Books =

English-language bookseller in Thailand

- Native name: เอเซียบุ๊คส
- Type: Subsidiary
- Industry: Retail; Bookselling; Publishing
- Founded: September 1969; 57 years ago in Bangkok, Thailand
- Number of locations: More than 80 (2026)
- Area served: Thailand
- Products: Books; Magazines; Stationery
- Parent: Berli Jucker Public Company Limited
- Website: https://asiabooks.com/

Asia Books (Thai: เอเซียบุ๊คส) is a chain of bookstores in Thailand that specialises in English-language books and magazines. It opened its first shop in Bangkok in September 1969 and became a subsidiary of Berli Jucker (BJC) in 2011. The company describes itself as the largest English-language bookstore chain in Thailand, and it operated more than 80 branches in 2026. Besides its stores, Asia Books runs an online bookstore and distributes books and magazines to more than 300 outlets and 400 libraries and schools.

== History ==
Asia Books Flagship Store at CentralWorld, Bangkok

Asia Books opened its first shop in Bangkok in September 1969. The shop sold English-language books, and it became known for its titles about Thailand and Southeast Asia. The company says that its target customers include English-speaking Thais, expatriates who live in Thailand, and tourists.

In 2006, the investment firm Actis bought Distri-Thai, the operator of the Bookazine chain and the main competitor of Asia Books. At that time, Asia Books was owned by the Thailand Equity Fund, and Lombard Investments sent Surasak Khaoroptham to lead the company as chairman and acting CEO. The two companies merged in 2007, and the combined business held about 60 percent of the English-language book retail market in Thailand with 65 shops.

In July 2011, Berli Jucker Public Company Limited (BJC) bought 100 percent of Asia Books from Actis and the Thailand Equity Fund. Since then, Asia Books has been part of the BJC Group, which also owns Big C Supercenter. By late 2011, the chain had 70 branches, and it was preparing to open its largest store at CentralWorld. In 2026, Asia Books partnered with Tsutaya Books Malaysia to open the first Tsutaya Bookstore in Thailand at One Bangkok. The store was scheduled to open on 20 October 2026.

== Stores and market ==
=== Geography ===
Most Asia Books shops are in Bangkok, where branches can be found in many of the city’s shopping malls. Outside the capital, the chain has stores in provinces such as Chiang Mai, Phuket and Chonburi, and at international airports including Suvarnabhumi and Don Mueang. In 2011, the company had 70 branches and planned to open 15 more in Bangkok and other provinces. By 2026, it operated more than 80 branches across the country.

=== Retail distribution ===
The chain uses several types of stores. Most branches are shops inside shopping centres, while others are located in airports, hospitals and office buildings. Some branches are shop-in-shop sections inside B2S stores. Bookazine shops were placed mainly in tourist areas from the north to the south of the country to serve foreign visitors.

=== Market climate ===
After the 2007 merger, the company held about 60 percent of the English-language book retail market in Thailand. In 2012, it expected its revenue to grow by 20 to 25 percent to about 1.2 billion baht. At its CentralWorld store, about 60 percent of customers were Thai and 40 percent were foreign. Other English-language booksellers in Bangkok include Books Kinokuniya, a Japanese chain with three stores in the city. Although e-books made up only about 5 percent of the company’s sales, it expected this share to reach at least 10 percent by 2014.

== Lifestyle and stationery ==
Besides books and magazines, Asia Books stores sell stationery, gifts, and lifestyle products. The CentralWorld branch, for example, also carries toys, board games, and trading cards. In 2026, Asia Books and Tsutaya Books Malaysia prepared to open Thailand’s first Tsutaya Bookstore at One Bangkok, where books are arranged next to stationery and design products from Japan. The store also has a children’s section of more than 15,000 books, a manga zone with licensed anime and manga merchandise, and a café.

== E-commerce and distribution ==
=== Online store ===
Asia Books sells books online through its website, asiabooks.com. By 2011, the website also sold e-books in Thai and English. The e-books came in PDF and EPUB formats with digital rights management. At that time, e-books made up about 5 percent of the company’s sales. According to BJC, the website offers about one million books, e-books and e-magazines for home delivery. Asia Books also has an official store on the online marketplace Lazada.

=== Distribution ===
Asia Books also works as a book and magazine distributor in Thailand. The company describes itself as the only distributor of international magazines in the country. Its distribution network covers more than 300 outlets. These outlets include other bookstore chains, hotel kiosks and supermarkets. The company also sells books directly to more than 400 libraries and schools. In 2011, it managed English-language book sections inside the B2S and SE-ED bookstore chains.

== Branches ==
=== Bangkok Metropolitan Region ===
==== Major Shopping Malls and Retail Complexes ====
- CentralWorld (Flagship Store, 6th Floor)
- Siam Paragon (2nd Floor)
- Emsphere (Ground Floor)
- Emsphere (2nd Floor)
- Terminal 21 Asok (LG Floor)
- Silom Complex (3rd Floor)
- Central Festival Eastville
- Central Bangna
- Central Rama 9
- Fashion Island (3rd Floor)
- Seacon Square Srinakarin (2nd Floor)
- Paradise Park (2nd Floor)
- The Crystal Park (Phase 3)
- Queen Sirikit National Convention Center (QSNCC)

==== Corporate Offices and Hospitals ====
- All Seasons Place (1st Floor)
- Empire Tower (2nd Floor)
- Park ventures (1st Floor)
- Bangkok Hospital (1st Floor)
- Samitivej Hospital Sukhumvit (Ground Floor)
- BJC2 Co-Working Space

==== Suburban Bangkok (Nonthaburi, Pathum Thani, Samut Prakan) ====
- Future Park Rangsit
- Central Plaza Chaengwattana (4th Floor)
- The Mall Ngamwongwan
- The Crystal SB Ratchapruek (2nd Floor)
- Mega Bangna (2nd Floor)
- Central Northville (1st Floor)

==== Airport Transit Location ====
- Suvarnabhumi Airport (KPS 1 Concourse C)
- Suvarnabhumi Airport (KPS 2 Concourse E)
- Suvarnabhumi Airport (KPS 4 Concourse A)
- Suvarnabhumi Airport (KPS 5 Concourse G)
- Don Mueang International Airport (Terminal 2)

==== Shop-in-Shop Concept ====
- B2S Central Chidlom
- B2S Central World (4th Floor)
- B2S Central Ladprao
- B2S Central Pinklao
- B2S Central Rama 2
- B2S Central Rama 3
- B2S Central Bangrak
- B2S Marketplace Nang Linchi
- B2S Central Westgate (Nonthaburi)
- B2S Central Westville (Nonthaburi)

=== Northern Region ===
- MAYA Lifestyle Shopping Center, Chiang Mai (3rd Floor)
- B2S Central Chiang Mai (3rd Floor)
- Suriwong Book Center, Chiang Mai (2nd Floor)
- Chiang Mai International Airport International Terminal (3rd Floor)
- Chiang Mai International Airport Domestic Terminal (2nd Floor)
- B2S Central Nakhon Sawan
- B2S Robinson Chiang Rai

=== Southern Region ===
- Central Phuket Floresta (3rd Floor)
- Central Festival Phuket (3rd Floor)
- SengHo Bookstore, Phuket
- B2S Porto de Phuket
- B2S Central Festival Samui (1st Floor)
- Samui International Airport
- Haven Samui Community Mall
- B2S Central Hat Yai (2nd Floor)
- Krabi International Airport (in both International and Domestic Terminals)

=== Eastern Region ===
- B2S Central Pattaya (4th Floor)
- Big C Pattaya

=== Northeastern Region ===
- B2S Central Korat (4th Floor)
- B2S Robinson Khon Kaen

=== Western Region ===
- Bluport Huahin Resort Mall
- Huahin Market Village
- B2S Central Nakhon pathom
