= Foodbank of Indonesia =

Non-profit foundation of Indonesia

- Founded: 2015
- Type: Nonprofit
- Location: Jakarta, Indonesia
- Website: foodbankindonesia.org

The Foodbank of Indonesia (FOI) is a non-profit foundation operating in the social sector. Located in Jakarta, the Food Bank of Indonesia is the first food bank in the country actively working to provide access to food and eradicate hunger in various regions across Indonesia. FOI also supports the country in achieving Sustainable Development Goals (SDGs), by promoting food sovereignty and implementing responsible patterns of production and consumption.

FOI has the slogan "Take what you need, give what you can."

The Food Bank of Indonesia operates through two distinct branches, each serving a specific facet of our mission. Firstly, we endeavor to address the issue of surplus food by directing these resources towards providing sustenance for individuals across various socioeconomic strata who find themselves in need. This initiative aligns with our commitment to mitigating hunger and ensuring that surplus food is utilized for the betterment of communities.

Secondly, in instances where surplus food is not suitable for direct consumption, FOI engages in strategic food production in regions with established agricultural expertise. This involves transforming inedible items into valuable agricultural inputs, particularly fertilizers. By doing so, we contribute to the advancement of sustainable agricultural practices and bolster the overall resilience of the agricultural sector.

== History ==
The Foodbank of Indonesia, established on May 20, 2015, in Jakarta, holds the distinction of being the first food bank in Indonesia. Founded by Wida Septiyani and Hendro Utomo, dedicated individuals who have become the driving force behind the organization, Foodbank of Indonesia (FOI) operates as a non-profit entity serving as a repository for surplus food, channeling it to communities in need. The establishment of FOI in May 2015 marked a concrete step in their commitment to supporting The Global Foodbank Network, a global non-profit organization dedicated to distributing food to those in need.

FOI plays a crucial role in collecting surplus food for distribution to beneficiaries, especially vulnerable groups such as children, the elderly, and those facing economic challenges. Currently, FOI's coverage extends to 39 locations in Java and beyond. The organization has a network comprising 4,454 volunteers and donors from various companies, stores, food producers, and retail traders. Together, FOI, along with its donors and volunteers, has distributed 1,246 tons or 88,095 food packages to FOI clients, including children, victims of natural disasters, the elderly, informal workers, and others.

== The issue of food waste in Indonesia ==
Food loss and waste (FLW) have emerged as key targets for achieving the Sustainable Development Goals (SDGs) by 2030. According to the Ministry of Environment and Forestry, a significant portion, 44%, of Indonesia's landfills is attributed to food waste. A report from the EIU highlights Indonesia as one of the world's major contributors to food waste, with an alarming figure of 300 kg/capita/year.

Ministry of National Development Planning estimates the FLW in Indonesia, spanning from 2000 to 2019, to be in the range of 115–184 kg/capita/year. This study emphasizes the need for a national policy addressing FLW reduction and the provision of comprehensive national FLW data. The integration of technology throughout the food supply chain, from harvest to retail distribution, is proposed as a solution to minimize food loss. Successful strategies to combat food waste require widespread socialization, educational initiatives, and a concerted public movement. Early cultural education discouraging food wastage is deemed crucial. The implementation of regulations and strategies to reduce FLW holds the potential to significantly boost food availability, promoting sustainable food security and nutrition in Indonesia.

== Food waste issue ==
The most recent global data reveals that 8% of all produced food worldwide is lost at the farm level, 14% between the farm gate and the retail sector, and 17% at the consumer level (including households, retailers, restaurants, and other food services). The economic repercussions of FLW are primarily tied to the value of lost food, which could be preserved with effective waste prevention. Numerous studies indicate that programs combating food waste often yield a high economic return, offering substantial benefits with minimal investment, especially when focusing on prevention. The environmental impact of FLW stems from the use of raw materials and natural resources for producing unconsumed food, contributing to 26% of global greenhouse gas emissions, primarily from agricultural processes and livestock rearing. With current FLW rates, it means that as much as 6% of global greenhouse gas emissions are attributed to producing food that is lost within the supply chain or during consumption. Inefficiencies in FLW also affect food security, jeopardizing the ability of food supply chains to adequately feed the growing population, which is projected to reach nine billion. From an ethical standpoint, the wastage of billions of tonnes of food is lamentable, especially when one in ten people globally is undernourished.

Initial studies on FLW provided an overview of the problem's magnitude and played a crucial role in raising awareness about the issue. The number of studies reporting FLW amounts at different stages of the food chain significantly increased after 2010, offering evidence of FLW generation in various settings. However, the approach remained fragmented for several years, with studies often focusing on case studies that were challenging to scale up or generalize. In recent years, following the global agreement on the Sustainable Development Goals of Agenda 2030, there has been increasing pressure to standardize FLW measurement methods across countries and stages of the food supply chain. The aim is to provide reliable input data for monitoring progress towards the targets set for FLW reduction.
