= Rachmat Pambudy =

Indonesian politician (born 1959)

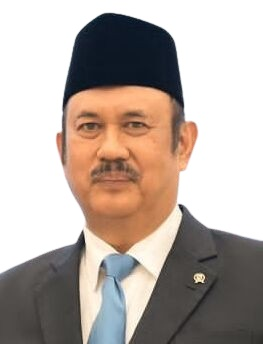

Minister of National Development Planning
- Incumbent
- Assumed office 21 October 2024
- President: Prabowo Subianto
- Preceded by: Suharso Monoarfa
- Deputy: Febrian Alphyanto Ruddyard

Personal details
- Born: Rachmat Pambudy; 23 December 1959 (age 66) Yogyakarta, Indonesia
- Party: Gerindra Party
- Spouse: Ninuk Mardiana Esilistiati
- Children: 3

Rachmat Pambudy (born 23 December 1959) is an Indonesian academic and politician serving as minister of national development planning since 2024. Since 2022, he has been a professor at IPB University.
