= Golden Indonesia 2045 Vision =

Indonesian vision statement

Golden Indonesia Vision 2045
- Visi Indonesia Emas 2045
- Official logo

Development program overview
- Formed: 9 May 2019; 7 years ago
- Type: Development program
- Jurisdiction: Government of Indonesia
- Minister responsible: Minister of National Development Planning
- Website: indonesia2045.go.id

The Golden Indonesia 2045 Vision (Indonesian: Visi Indonesia Emas 2045) is an Indonesian ideal that sets the goal for the country to be sovereign, advanced, fair and prosperous by its centennial in 2045. The goal is set in 2045, since by then Indonesia will commemorate 100 years of its independence. The vision was formulated by the Ministry of National Development Planning and was launched by Indonesian president Joko Widodo on 9 May 2019. Jokowi is optimistic that Indonesia will become the world's fourth or fifth largest economy by 2045. He reiterated the vision once again during his second term inauguration speech on 20 October 2019, in which he envisioned that Indonesia will become a developed country, to rise among the world's top five largest economies by 2045.

== History and development ==
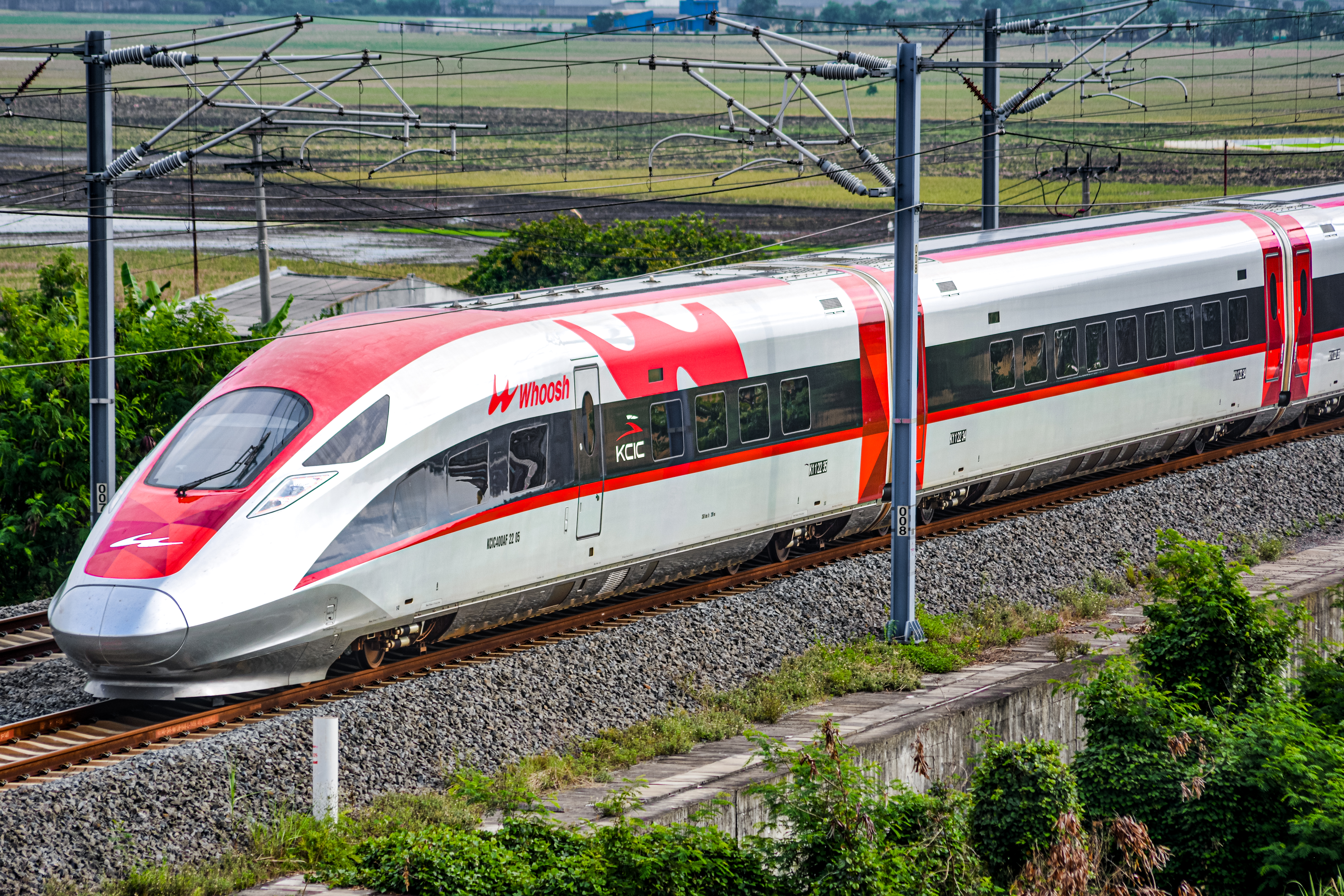
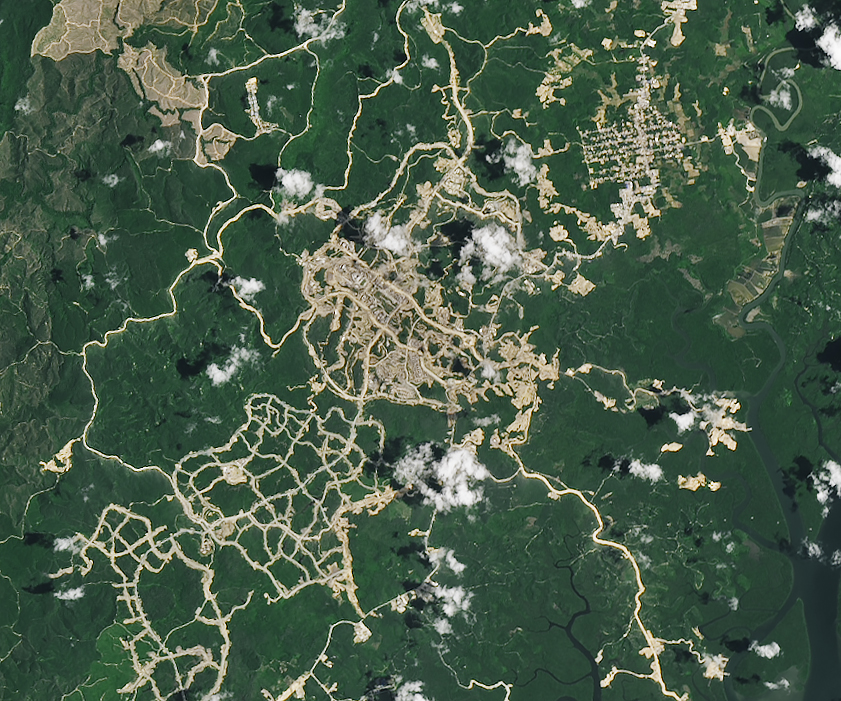
Whoosh high-speed train (left) and future capital city Nusantara (right). Indonesia is currently boosting its infrastructure development.

The shared national vision—that in the future Indonesia will transition from a modest agriculture and raw commodity-based developing country into an advanced industrial, service and technology-based developed nation—has been contemplated for generations. During Suharto's New Order administration around 1970s to mid 1990s, the planning took form as Garis-Garis Besar Haluan Negara (GBHN) or outlines of state's policy, aimed for Lepas Landas or "take-off" as the country gradually transformed into a newly industrialized country. However, the 1997 Asian financial crisis hit Indonesia hard, which caused the economic contraction and crippled the development. Subsequently, the crisis sparked the unrest and reformation movement that led to the fall of Suharto regime.

In the several years following the turn of the 21st century, Indonesian economy has recovered, and the rising trends of economic growth and development continues. After 10 years, Indonesia has succeed weather the storm, transformed itself from a chaotic almost-failed state in 1998, into a thriving democratic society, also one of the strongest economies in Asia by 2007. This has led to a more optimistic outlook regarding Indonesian future. In 2009 Indonesia was admitted as a member of G20 among world's major economies, thus become a sole representative of Southeast Asian region.

In June 2013, in his speech in Bali, President Susilo Bambang Yudhoyono expressed his high hopes; that in the 100th Anniversary of the Republic of Indonesia, the nation would rise to become a developed country in terms of economic, political, and social aspects, and also exercise considerable international influence in the region. He said; "I have a vision and a dream that in 2045 our economy will be truly strong and just, our democracy will mature, and our civilisation will flourish."

Moreover, Indonesia is predicted to enjoy demographic bonus between 2030 and 2040, that will boost Indonesian development towards vision 2045 as a developed nation. By that time, the number of workforce or the population of productive age (aged 15–64 years old) is greater than the population of non productive age (aged at under 15 years and above 64 years old). During this period, the population of productive age is predicted to reach 64 percent of the total projected Indonesian population of 297 million.

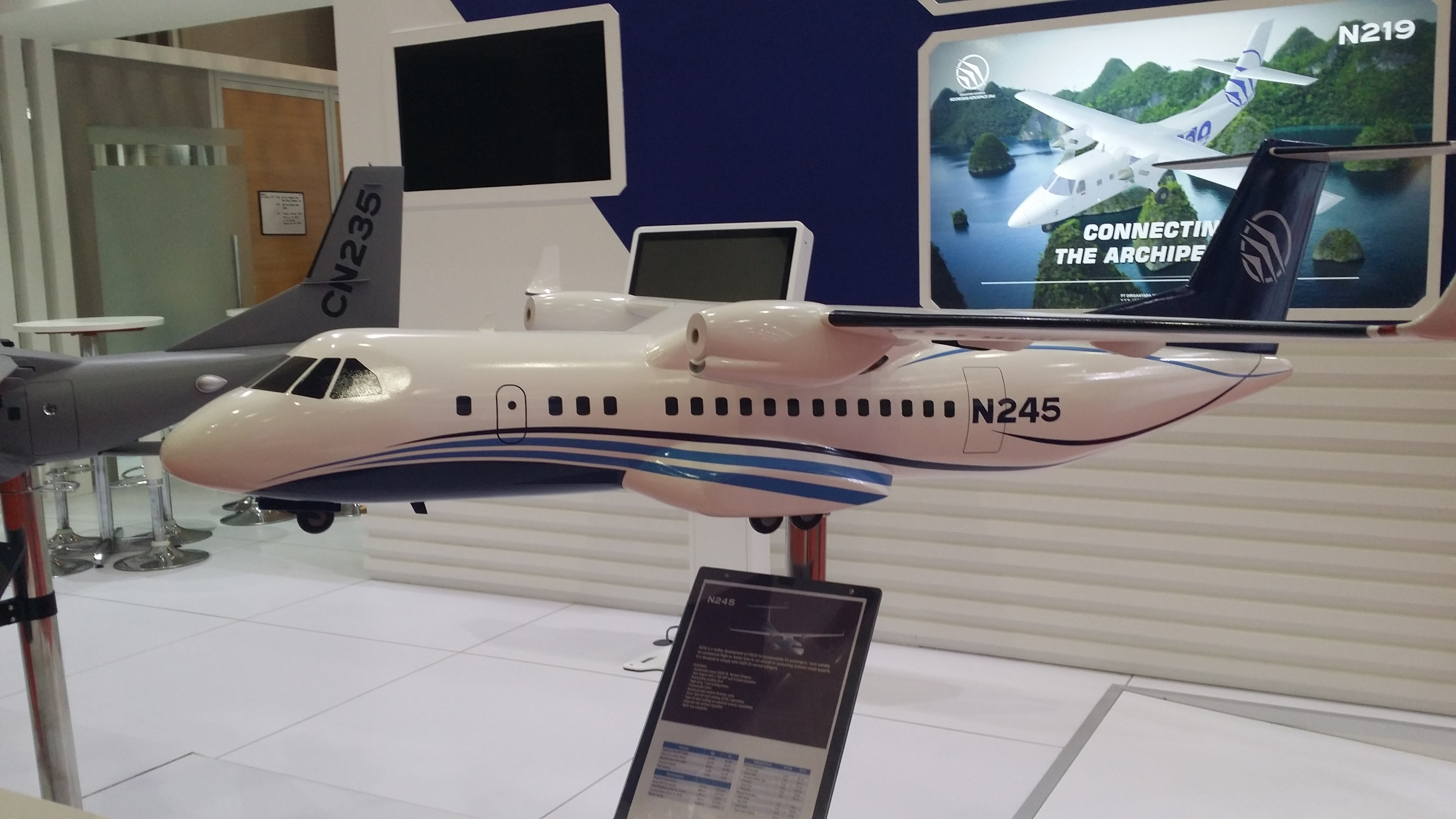
A model of N-245. Indonesia is also pursuing science and technology mastery, among others by developing its own aviation industry.

On 30 December 2015 in Merauke, President Joko Widodo wrote his vision titled "Indonesian Dream 2015–2085". In his notebook he wrote seven dreams of lofty goals for Indonesian future, they are:

1. Indonesian human resources whose intelligence outperforms other nations in the world
2. Indonesian people who uphold pluralism, cultured, religious, and uphold ethical values
3. Indonesia is the center of education, technology and world civilisation
4. Society and government apparatus are free from corruption
5. Equitable infrastructure development throughout Indonesia
6. Indonesia is an independent and free country and one of the most influential in the Asia Pacific
7. Indonesia is a benchmark (example) of world economic growth

On 2017, the Ministry of National Development Planning of Indonesia (Kementerian PPN-Bappenas) has finished formulating the vision. The vision was officially launched by President Joko Widodo on 9 May 2019. In this vision, the government set a target for Indonesia in 2045 to become the fifth largest economy in the world with a GDP of US$7.3 trillion and per capita income reaching US$25,000.

President Joko Widodo reiterated the vision once again during his second term inauguration speech in Parliamentary Complex on 20 October 2019. To achieve these goals, Joko Widodo has set 5 policies that he would implement during his second term administration between 2019 and 2024:

1. Continuing the infrastructure development
2. Developing human resource
3. Inviting investments to the maximum extent
4. Reforming bureaucracy
5. Ensuring that the state budgets spending are focused and better-targeted

== Four pillars of vision 2045 ==
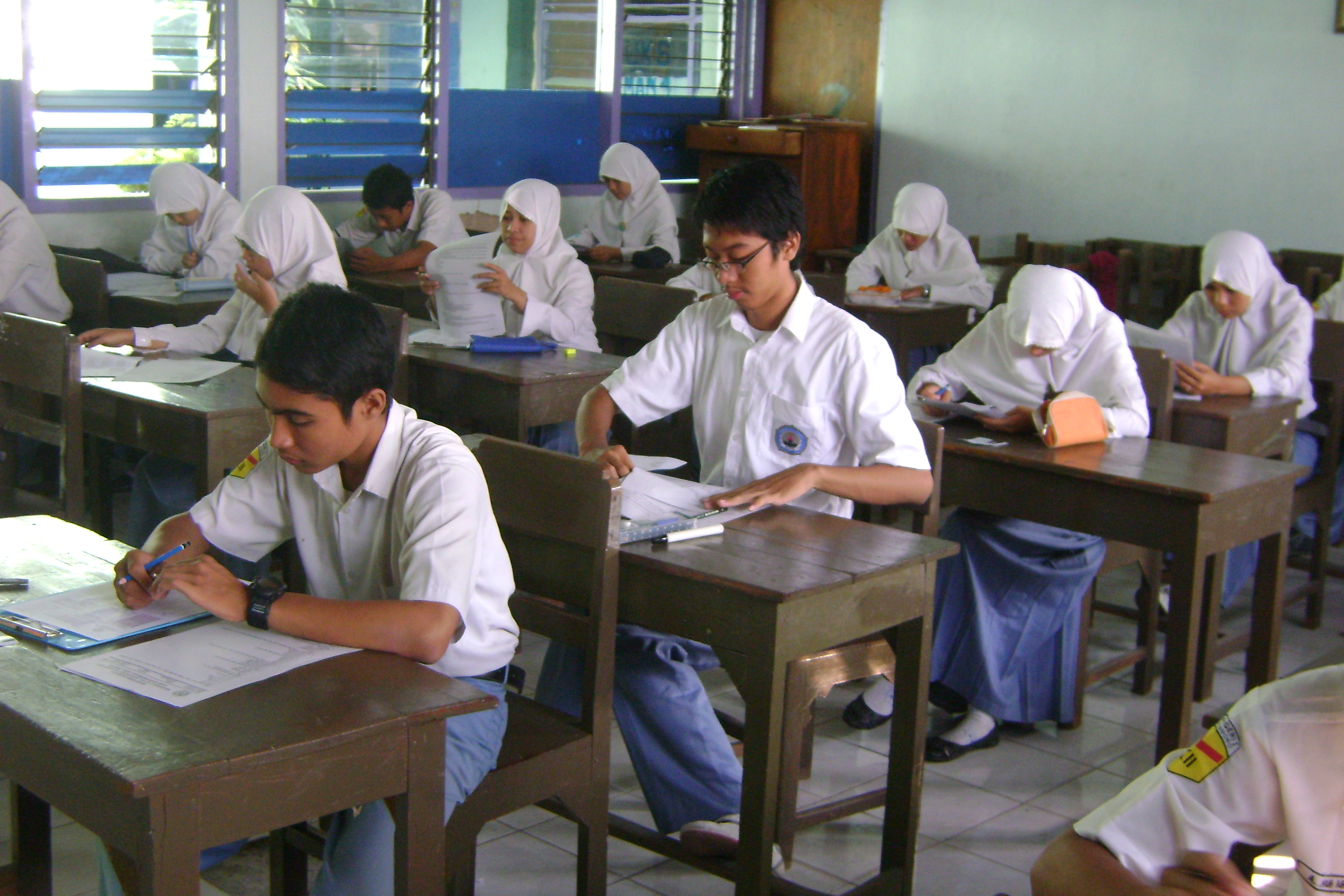
Education plays an important role in improving the quality of Indonesian human resources to achieve its 2045 goals.

The vision 2045 is built upon four pillars in accordance to Pancasila and National Constitution of 1945, these pillars are:

1. Human development and the mastery of science and technology
2. Sustainable economic development
3. Equitable development
4. Strengthening national resilience and governance

The four goals of these pillars in accordance to the preamble of the national constitution are: (Note: The national goal, which was written in the Preamble to the 1945 Constitution, explains that the goals of Indonesian independence which are "to protect the whole of the Indonesian people and to create common public welfare, improve national education, and to participate to carrying out world order based on the liberty, eternal peace, and social justice".)

1. Protect all Indonesian citizen and all its people
2. Promotes general welfare
3. Enlighten the national life
4. Implement world order based on liberty, eternal peace and social justice

== See also ==
- Wawasan Nusantara
- Economy of Indonesia
- Demographics of Indonesia
- Egypt Vision 2030
