= Nusantara (term) =

Sociopolitical term for Maritime Southeast Asia

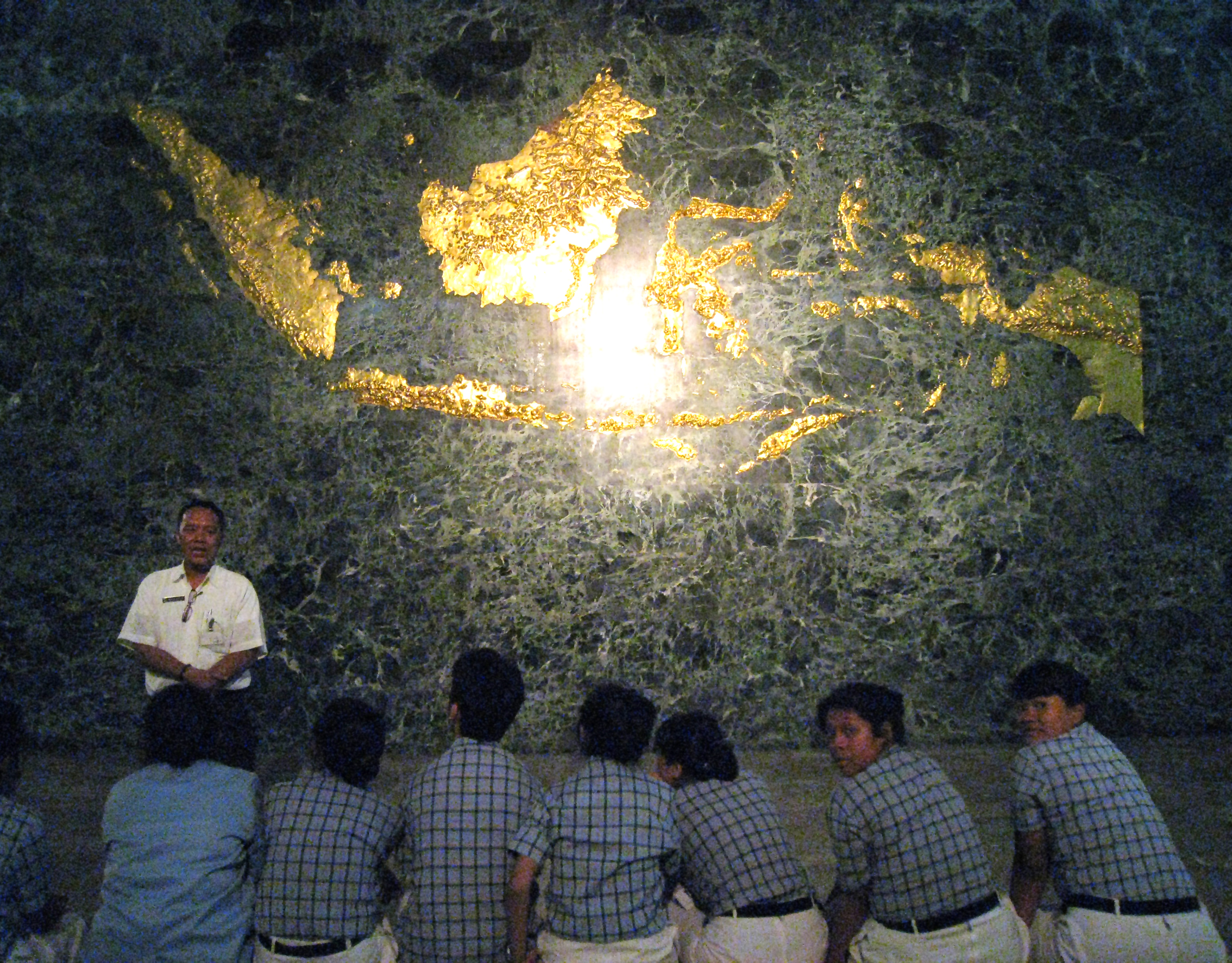
A gilded map in the Hall of Independence, Indonesian National Monument, Jakarta. Also included are Sabah, Sarawak, and Labuan (states and a federal territory of Malaysia), Brunei, and Timor Leste.

Nusantara is the Indonesian name of Maritime Southeast Asia (or certain parts of it). It is an Old Javanese term that literally means "outer islands". In Indonesia, it is generally taken to mean the Indonesian Archipelago. Outside of Indonesia, the term has been adopted to refer to the Malay Archipelago.

The term 'Nusantara' first recorded in the 1177 Saka (1255 AD) Mūla Malurung inscription of the Singhasari Kingdom. The word Nusantara is also taken from an oath by Gajah Mada in 1336, as written in the Old Javanese Pararaton. Gajah Mada was a powerful military leader and prime minister of Majapahit credited with bringing the empire to its peak of glory. Gajah Mada delivered the Palapa oath, in which he vowed not to eat any food containing spices until he had conquered all of Nusantara under the glory of Majapahit. The concept of Nusantara as a unified region was not invented by Gajah Mada in 1336. Furthermore, in 1275, the term Cakravala Mandala Dvipantara was used by Kertanegara of Singasari to describe the aspiration of united Southeast Asian archipelago under Kertanegara and marked the beginning of his Pamalayu campaign to achieve it. Dvipantara is a Sanskrit word for the "islands in between", making it a synonym to Nusantara as both dvipa and nusa mean "island". Kertanegara envisioned the union of Southeast Asian maritime kingdoms and polities under Singhasari as a bulwark against the rise of the expansionist Mongol-led Yuan dynasty of China.

The term 'Nusantara' also appears in the Sulalatus Salatin manuscript, specifically within the narrative titled Peristiwa Tatal dan Menarah Kepala Budak.

In a wider sense, Nusantara in modern language usage includes Austronesian-related cultural and linguistic lands, namely, Indonesia, Malaysia, Singapore, Southern Thailand, the Philippines, Brunei, Timor Leste and Taiwan, while excluding Papua New Guinea.

== Etymology ==
The term Nusantara derives from two words of Austronesian and Sanskrit origin, the word nūsa (see also nusa) meaning "island" in Old Javanese, is ultimately derived from the Proto-Malayo-Polynesian word *nusa with the same meaning, and the word antara is a Javanese loanword borrowed from Sanskrit अन्तरा (antarā) meaning "between" or "in the middle", thus creating a compound word of nūsa (“island”) + antara (“interval, interspace; other, another, different”), which together means "the outer islands", as mentioned in the 13th century Old Javanese Mūla Malurung inscription. The Pararaton and Negarakertagama manuscripts written in the 14th century also include it.

== Attestation ==
Other attestations of term are found in Sarwadharma inscription (1269 CE), Adan-adan inscription (1301 CE), Balawi inscription (1305 CE). Alongside the form of Dwipantara as found in Camunda inscription (1292 CE). Both it and Nusantara have the same meaning, as dwipa and nusa are synonyms for island.

Excerpts from Mula Malurung inscription (1255 CE):

- Plate VI.b

mwaŋ dumadyakěn wŕ ddhi niŋ yaśānurāga nira narāryya smi niŋ rāt. prakaśita riŋ nūśa para nūśa. tinūt i parāmadigwijaya nira narāryya smi niŋ rāt. an mahakěn samalělö niŋ sayawadwīpa mańůala. anūlūya ni nūsāntara

Translation:

The Prabhu's position became stronger on the golden throne and became a test for the fame of Narāryya Sminingrāt's virtues which was prominent throughout the entire Java Island and continued to [the entire] nusantara.

- Plate IX.b

nakaikacchātra niŋ bhūwana sayawadwīpamaṇḍala. anuluyani nūṣāntara. an maṅkana panambaḥ saŋ rāmapati

Translation:

as an umbrella that cover the world of Java, followed by Nusantara. Thus the Ramapati's words of worship

The most well known excerpt is perhaps from the Pararaton, a late Old Javanese (sometimes termed "middle Javanese") language text chronicling the royal dynasty of Singasari and Majapahit. In the relevant passage, the term is used in relation to the Palapa oath undertaken by the Majapahit mahapatih (grand regent) Gajah Mada:

Sira Gajah Madapatih amangkubhumi tan ayun amuktia palapa, sira Gajah Mada: "Lamun huwus kalah nusantara isun amukti palapa, lamun kalah ring Gurun, ring Seran, Tañjungpura, ring Haru, ring Pahang, Dompo, ring Bali, Sunda, Palembang, Tumasik, samana isun amukti palapa"

Translation:

[Eventually] Gajah Mada became patih mangkubumi, [but] did not want to amukti palapa. Gajah Mada [swore], "If I have conquered the Nusantara Archipelago, [then] I will amukti palapa. If [I have] conquered Gurun, Seran, Tanjungpura, Haru, Pahang, Dompo, Bali, Sunda, Palembang, Tumasik, then I will amukti palapa."

The word Nusantara was not only used by the Javanese and did not disappear after the fall of Majapahit. This word can be found in Malay Annals, a classic Malay literature written as early as 1612, but it remained known even in the 1808 manuscript:

Terlalu sekali besar kerajaan Baginda (Majapahit) pada zaman itu, segala seluruh Jawa semuanya dalam hukum Baginda, dan segala raja-raja Nusantarapun setengah sudah ta-luk kepada baginda

Translation:

Very big was the kingdom of Baginda (the king of Majapahit) at that time, all of Java was under Baginda's law, and half of the kings of the Nusantara archipelago were submissive to Baginda.

== Ancient concepts ==
Majapahit Negara Agung (grand state) and Mancanagara (provinces) in eastern and central parts of Java, including the islands of Madura and Bali.

The extent of Majapahit Nusantara according to Nagarakretagama.

In Javanese, Nusantara is derived from nūsa 'island' and antara, 'between'. It means "outer islands" or "other islands" (in the sense of "islands beyond Java in between the Indian and Pacific Oceans"), referring to the islands outside of Java under hegemony of the Majapahit Empire. The term is commonly erroneously translated as "archipelago" in modern times. Based on the Majapahit concept of state, the monarch had power over three areas:

1. Negara Agung, or the Grand State — the core realm of the kingdom where Majapahit formed before becoming an empire. This included the capital city and the surrounding areas where the king effectively exercised his government: the area in and around royal capital of Trowulan, port of Canggu and sections of Brantas River valley near the capital, as well as the mountainous areas south and southeast of the capital, all the way to the Pananggungan and Arjuno-Welirang peaks. The Brantas river valley corridor, connecting the Majapahit Trowulan area to Canggu and the estuarine areas in Kahuripan (Sidoarjo) and Hujung Galuh (Surabaya), is also considered to be part of Negara Agung.
2. Mancanegara, the areas surrounding Negara Agung — this traditionally referred to the Majapahit provinces of East and Central Java ruled by the Bhres (dukes), the king's close relatives. This included the rest of Java as well as Madura and Bali. These areas were directly influenced by Majapahit court culture and obliged to pay annual tributes; their rulers might have been directly related to, allied with, and/or intermarried with the Majapahit royal family. Majapahit officials and officers were stationed in these places to regulate their foreign trade activities and collect taxes, but beyond this mancanegara provinces enjoyed substantial autonomy in internal affairs. In later periods, overseas provinces which had adopted Javanese culture or possessed significant trading importance were also considered mancanegara. The ruler of these provinces was either a willing vassal of the Majapahit king or a regent appointed by the king to rule the region. These realms included Dharmasraya, Pagaruyung, Lampung and Palembang in Sumatra.
3. Nusantara, areas which did not reflect Javanese culture, but were included as colonies which had to pay annual tribute. This included the vassal kingdoms and colonies in the Malay Peninsula, Borneo, the Lesser Sunda Islands, Sulawesi, Maluku, New Guinea, and the Sulu Archipelago. These regions enjoyed substantial autonomy and internal freedom, and Majapahit officials and military officers were not necessarily stationed there; however, any challenges to Majapahit oversight might have drawn a severe response.

== Nusantara concept in the 20th century ==
Modern Wawasan Nusantara, the Indonesian archipelagic baselines pursuant to article 47, paragraph 9, of the United Nations Convention on the Law of the Sea (UNCLOS)

In 1920, Ernest Francois Eugene Douwes Dekker (1879–1950), also known as Setiabudi, proposed Nusantara as a name for the independent country of Indonesia which did not contain any words etymologically related to the name of India or the Indies. This is the first instance of the term Nusantara appearing after it had been written into Pararaton manuscript.

The definition of Nusantara introduced by Setiabudi is different from the 14th-century definition of the term. During the Majapahit era, Nusantara described vassal areas that had been conquered. Setiabudi defined Nusantara as all the Indonesian regions from Sabang to Merauke.

== Modern usage ==
=== Indonesia ===
Nowadays, in Indonesian, Nusantara is synonymous with either the Indonesian Archipelago or the national territory of Indonesia. In this sense, the term Nusantara excludes Malaysia, Singapore, Brunei, Timor Leste, and the Philippines. In 1967, it transformed into the concept of Wawasan Nusantara, or "archipelagic outlook," which regards the archipelagic realm of Indonesia (the islands and seas within/surrounding the country) as a single unity of several aspects, mainly socio-cultural, linguistic, political, economic, security-driven and defensive unity.

Nusantara is also the name of the future capital of Indonesia.

=== Outside Indonesia ===
In Brunei, Malaysia and Singapore, the term is generally used to refer to the Malay Archipelago or the Malay realm (Malay: Alam Melayu) which includes those countries.

In a more scholarly manner without national borders, Nusantara in a modern language usage "refers to the sphere of influence of the Austronesian-related cultural and linguistic islands that comprise Indonesia, Malaysia, Singapore, the southernmost part of Thailand, the Philippines, Brunei, Timor Leste and perhaps even Taiwan, but it does not involve the areas of Papua New Guinea."

== Foreign Nusantara studies ==
The Nusantara Society in Moscow conducts studies on the Nusantara region's history, culture, languages and politics.

== See also ==
- East Indies
- Greater Indonesia
- History of Indonesia
- Indonesian archipelago
- Irredentism
- Islam Nusantara
- Malay Archipelago
- Malay race
- Malay world
- Malayness
  - Bumiputera
  - Pribumi
- Maphilindo
- Maritime Southeast Asia
- Nanyang (region)
- Nusantao Maritime Trading and Communication Network
- Nusantara Society
- Wawasan Nusantara
