= Geospatial Information Agency =

Indonesian mapping agency

- Badan Informasi Geospasial
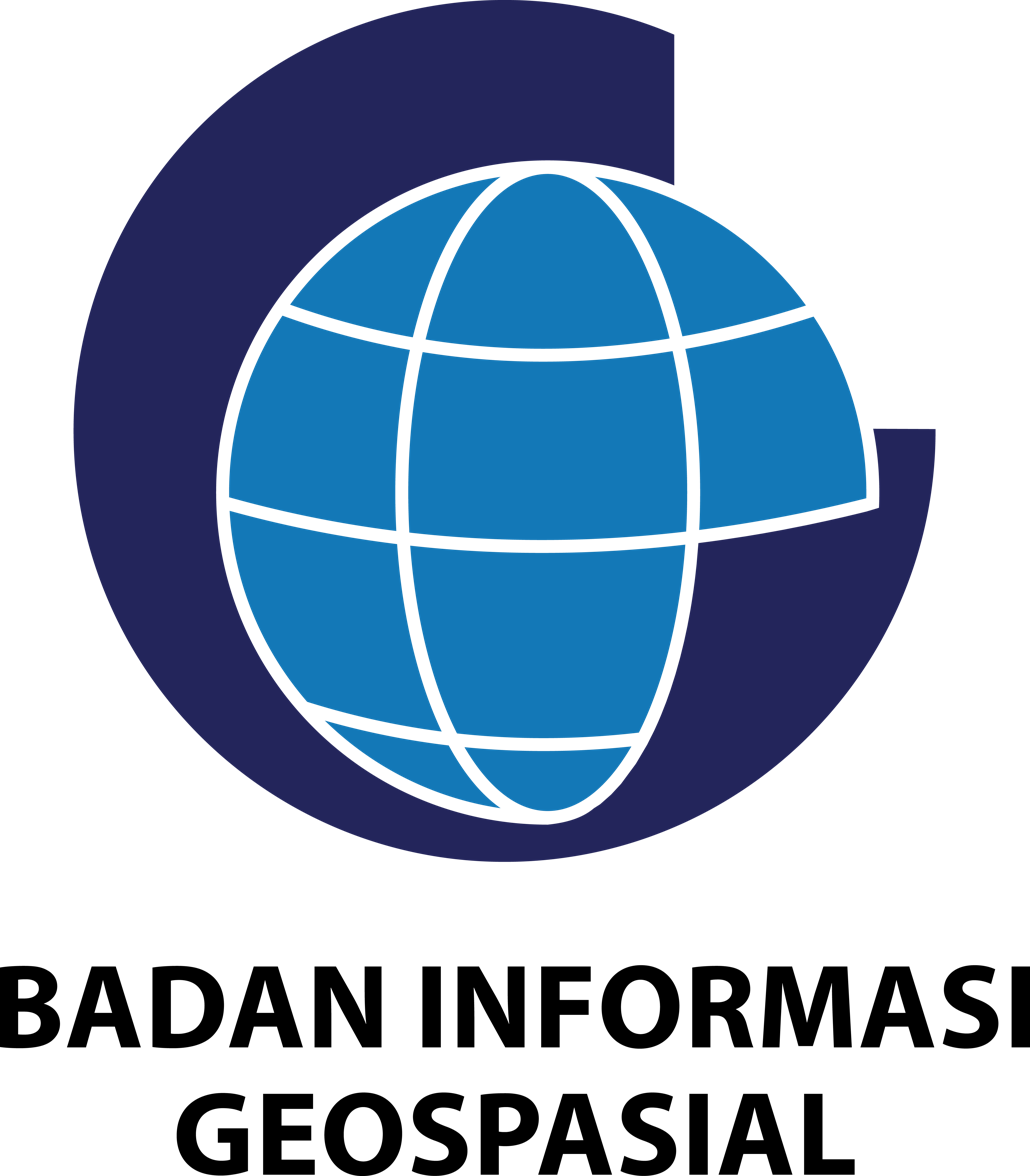
- Logo of the Geospatial Information Agency

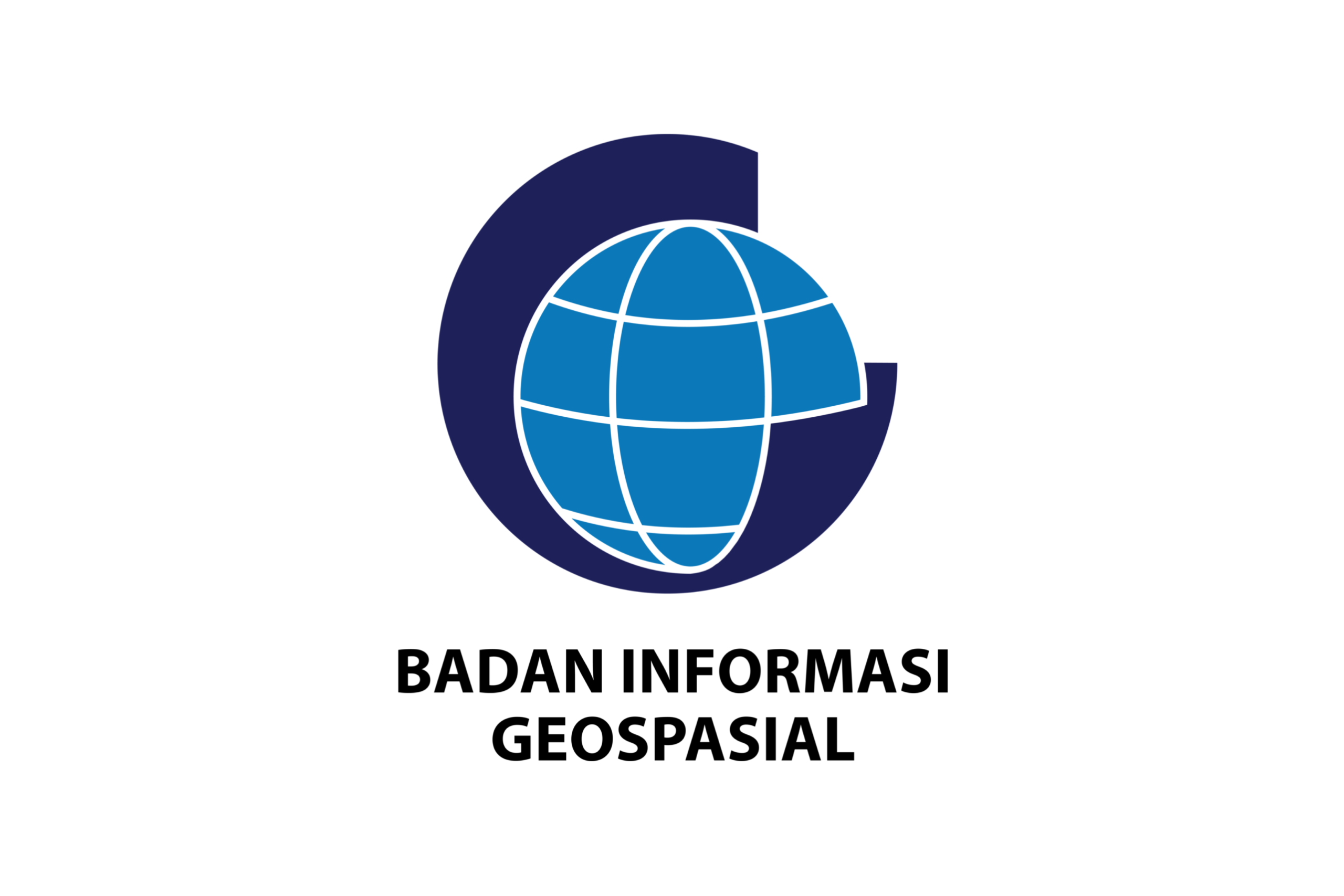
- Flag of the Geospatial Information Agency

Agency overview
- Formed: 17 October 1969
- Jurisdiction: Indonesia
- Headquarters: Jalan Raya Jakarta – Bogor km 46, Cibinong 16911, Indonesia
- Agency executive: Muh Aris Marfai, Head
- Parent department: Ministry of National Development Planning
- Website: www.big.go.id

Geospatial Information Agency (Indonesian: Badan Informasi Geospasial, abbreviation: BIG) is the national mapping agency of Indonesia. BIG was formerly named National Coordinator for Survey and Mapping Agency (Indonesian: Badan Koordinasi Survei dan Pemetaan Nasional, abbreviation: Bakosurtanal). This national agency is responsible for Indonesian geospatial information per one map policy implementation. In 2010, Susilo Bambang Yudhoyono (former president of Indonesia) stated that Indonesia should have a single referenced map, so there would not be any differences in spatial data for country development.

Geospatial Information Agency is mandated by the Presidential Regulation No. 9 Year 2016 pertaining to the Implementation of One Map Policy to play a key role in achieving the goal of having one standardized map by the end of 2019. Specifically, Geospatial Information Agency is tasked to chair the One Map Policy Implementation Team as stipulated in Chapter 6, Article 3 of the regulation. Furthermore, this agency is also responsible to assist the Acceleration Team chaired by Indonesia's Coordinating Ministry of Economic Affairs to resolve land and map conflicts as the result of One Map Policy implementation.

Despite the agency function as primary imagery intelligence agency of Indonesia and part of Indonesian intelligence system, the agency was coordinated under the Ministry of Research and Technology prior 1 November 2015. On 1 November 2015, the agency coordination transferred to the Ministry of National Development Planning in pursuant of the Presidential Decree No. 127/2015. On 1 November 2022, based on the latest constituting document, Presidential Decree No. 128/2022, the agency placed under the President with Ministry of National Development Planning coordination.

== Structure ==
The latest BIG structure, based on Geospatial Information Agency Regulation No. 7/2023,

1. Chairman of BIG
2. Prime Secretary of BIG
  1. Bureau of Planning, Human Resources, and Organization
  2. Bureau of Public Relations and Cooperation
  3. Bureau of General Affairs and Finance
    1. Division of General Affairs and Procurement Service
    2. Division of Administration and Protocols
3. Deputy Chairman of Base Geospatial Information
  1. Directorate for Geospatial Referencing System
  2. Directorate for Terrestrial Mapping
  3. Directorate for Marine and Coastal Mapping
  4. Directorate for Boundary Mapping and Toponymy
4. Deputy Chairman of Thematic Geospatial Information
  1. Directorate for Integration and Synchronization of Thematic Geospatial Information
  2. Directorate for Thematic Mapping
  3. Directorate for Atlas and Geospatial Information Utilization
5. Deputy Chairman of Geospatial Information Infrastructure
  1. Directorate for Geospatial Information Human Resources
  2. Directorate for Institutional Affairs and Geospatial Information Network
  3. Directorate for Geospatial Standards and Information Technology
6. Center for Geospatial Competency Development
7. Inspectorate
8. Indonesian Center for Geospatial Services and Products, Cibinong, Bogor
9. Parangtritis Geomaritime Science Park, Yogyakarta
