= Wawasan Nusantara =

Geopolitical views of Indonesia

Modern Wawasan Nusantara, the Indonesian archipelagic baselines pursuant to article 47, paragraph 9, of the United Nations Convention on the Law of the Sea (UNCLOS)

Wawasan Nusantara, or Indonesian Archipelagic Vision, is the national vision of Indonesia towards their people, nation, and territory of the unitary state of the Republic of Indonesia (including its land and sea as well as the air and space above it) as a unity of political, economic, social, cultural, defensive and security-driven entities. This national insight subsequently serves as the perspective or vision of the nation towards its national goals and ideals.

Wawasan Nusantara is meant to be adopted as the Indonesian geopolitical stance, or the geographic effect of the archipelago on regional politics and international relations, regarded from an Indonesian perspective that advocates for the national interest of the entire republic. The wawasan nusantara geopolitical stance is often used by the Indonesian government to argue for national maritime integrity in some issues of territorial disputes with neighbouring countries.

Since the mid-1980s, the concept of wawasan nusantara has been included in the Indonesian education curriculum and taught within geography education in high school. The subject of wawasan nusantara is also taught in kewiraan (civics and citizenship) education in universities to educate about citizenship, nationalism and Indonesian geopolitical standpoints. In 2019, the Indonesian Geography Community (Komunitas Geografi) submitted a proposal to teach geography as early as elementary school, a wawasan nusantara concept with emphasis on disaster mitigation, management and response processes as part of national resilience; it would be in accordance with Indonesian geography and geology as an archipelagic nation located right on top of the Ring of Fire, which is prone to natural disasters.

== Etymology and definition ==
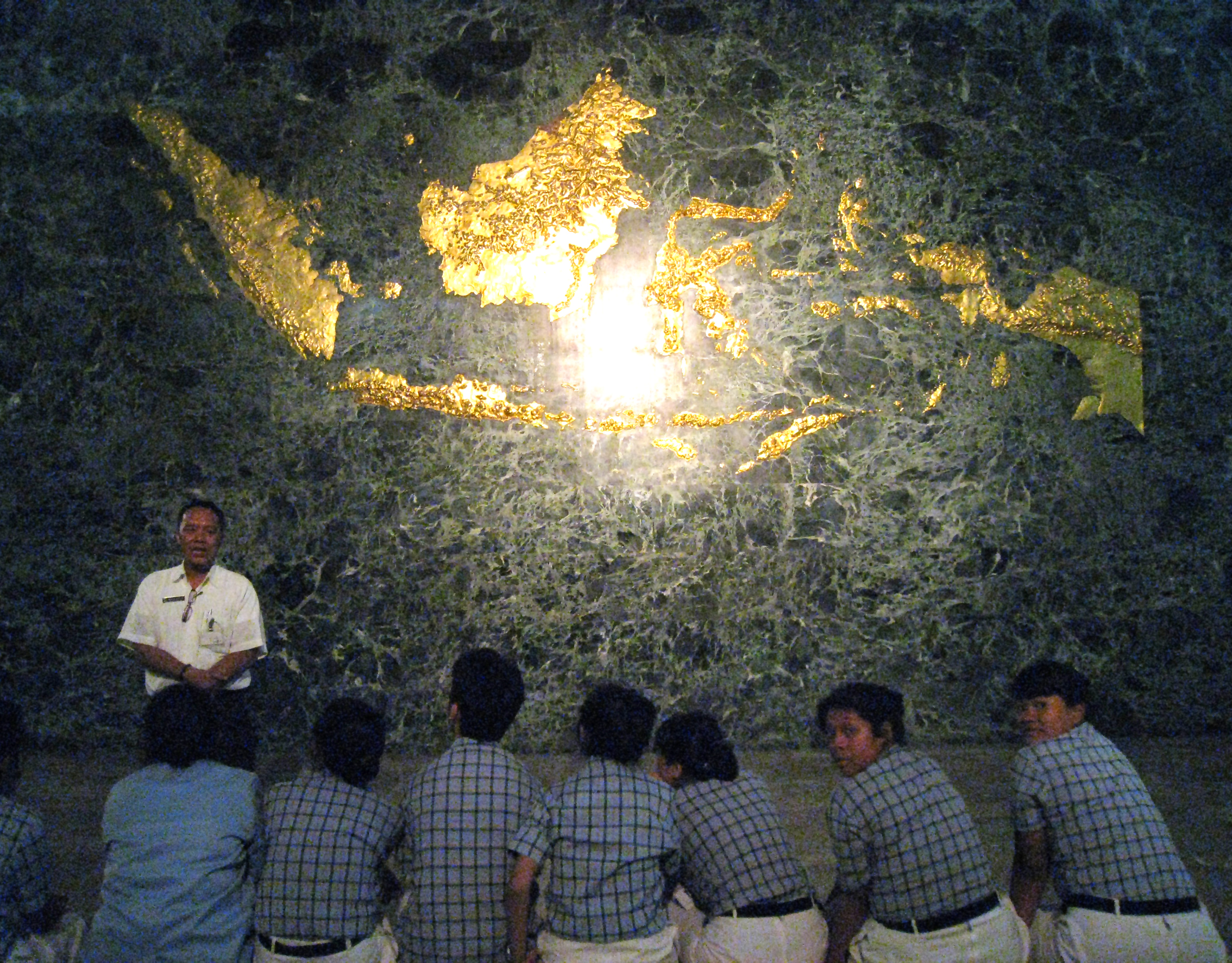
Students get an explanation about the concept of Nusantara, in front of the gold-plated archipelago map, symbolizing the homeland of the Unitary Republic of Indonesia in the Monas Independence Hall, Jakarta.

In Indonesian, wawasan means "vision", "insight" or "concept", while Nusantara generally refer to the Indonesian archipelago,

Wawasan nusantara is the fundamental standpoint of Indonesian geopolitics. Literally, wawasan nusantara means the "archipelagic concept"; contextually this term is more accurately translated as "Indonesian archipelagic vision". Wawasan nusantara is a way for Indonesia to look at itself (geographically) as a unity of ideology, politics, economy, socio-cultural, security and defense aspects.

Wawasan Nusantara is the archipelagic insight of Indonesian geopolitics. It is the perspective of the Indonesian people regarding themselves, their homeland, and the strategic values of their surroundings. It prioritize national unity and integrity, while still respecting every aspect of regional diversity to achieve national goals.

The concept attempts to overcome Indonesia inherent geographic challenges—a state that comprises thousands of islands as well as thousands of socio-cultural backgrounds of its people. Vis-à-vis the state that eager and fighting for a national unification, the waters between the islands must be considered as the connectors rather than separators.

Furthermore, wawasan nusantara is related to the ideological and constitutional basis, namely as a perspective and attitude of the Indonesian people regarding themselves and their geographical location, according to the national ideology Pancasila and the Constitution of 1945. In its implementation, wawasan nusantara prioritises regional unity while honouring its diversity to achieve social harmony, common prosperity, progress, and other national goals.

Two Indonesian statesman are credited for the development this Indonesian geopolitics concept; they are Djuanda Kartawidjaja—credited for the 1957 Djuanda Declaration, and Mochtar Kusumaatmadja—former Indonesian foreign minister (1978–1988) that advocated for archipelagic insight to be accepted internationally.

== Background ==
=== History ===
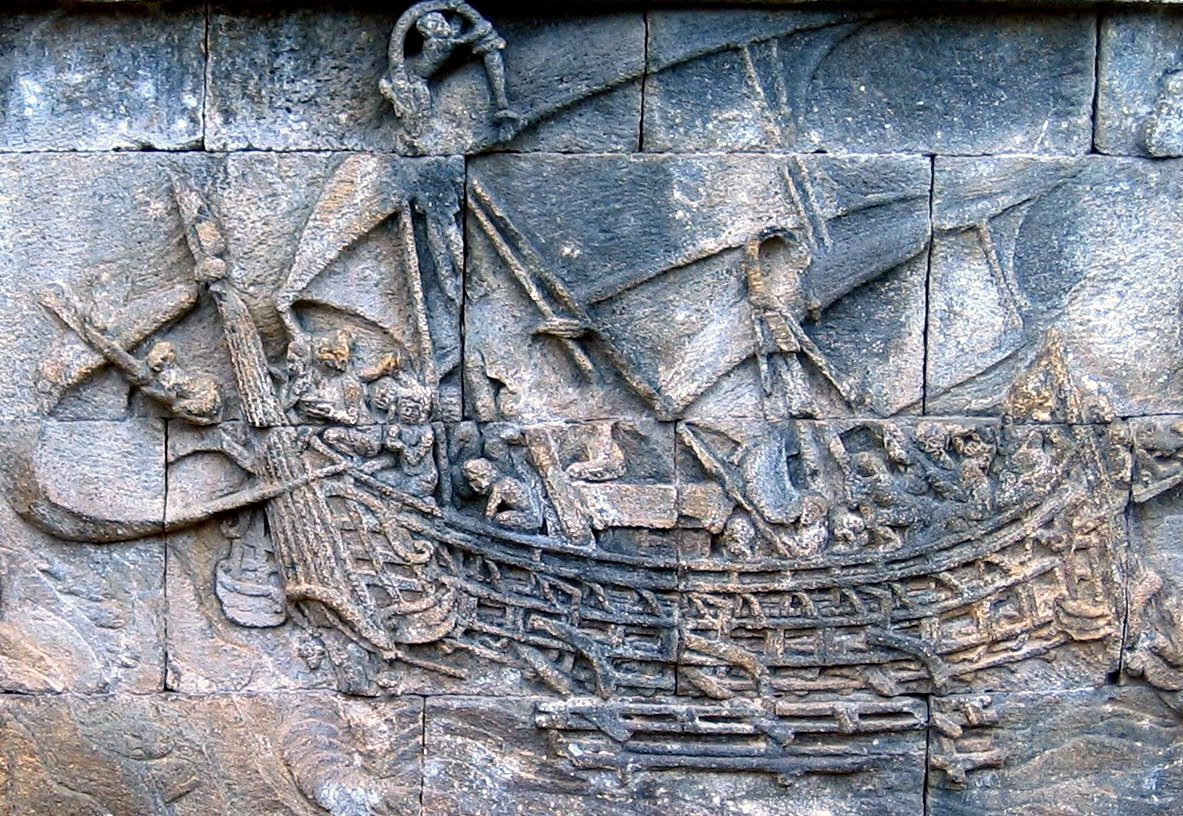
The image of a 9th-century ship on Borobudur bas relief, which argues for Indonesia's past as a regional maritime power.

In Indonesian history, the native ancient kingdoms that rose to become a regional hegemon are usually a thalassocracy; such as Srivijaya (7th to 12th century) and Majapahit (14th to 15th century). This was much owed to the strategic location of Indonesian archipelago as the nexus of ancient global trade connecting two centers of Asian civilisations—ancient India and imperial China, involved actively in global spice trade, which was also the important part of the ancient Maritime Silk Road.

During the Dutch East Indies period, the Ordonantie (Dutch Law) 1939, mentioned about the determination of the territorial sea which was along the 3 nautical miles width by drawing along a base line based on the tidal or island contour. This provision creates international waters in many parts of the sea between Indonesian islands (e.g. in the center of Java Sea and Banda Sea) which was outside the national jurisdiction.

Indonesians shared a historical experiences of regional disunity, which must be avoided for the survival of the nation. This is because the national independence has been achieved through the spirit of unity among Indonesian people themselves. Thus, this spirit must be nurtured and maintained for national unity to preserve and protect territorial integrity of Indonesia.

After the independence, Indonesia find itself as the custodian of world's main shipping lanes connecting Pacific Ocean with Indian Ocean, connecting East Asia with Middle East and Australia. Those main lanes are Malacca Strait, Karimata Strait, Sunda Strait, Makassar Strait, Lombok Strait and Ombai Strait. Sitting on the nexus of global maritime trade route has made Indonesian waters prone to be involved in global power struggle between global maritime powers. Thus, ensuring security of its territorial waters is a national priority.

On 13 December 1957, Indonesian Government announced Djuanda Declaration regarding the territorial waters of the Republic of Indonesia. In this declaration, the sea boundaries is no longer based on tidal lines, but on a straight base line measured from the outline connecting the outermost points of the islands which are included within the territory of the Republic of Indonesia. This erased international waters between Indonesian islands, thus increase the territorial waters. The determination of territorial waters are increased from 3 nautical miles to 12 nautical miles. The Exclusive Economic Zone (EEZ) as an International Law regime, in which the 200-mile archipelagic boundaries are measured from the baseline of Indonesian territorial waters. With the Djuanda Declaration, thus legally and formally Indonesia became a whole undivided unity of lands and waters.

=== Socio-cultural ===
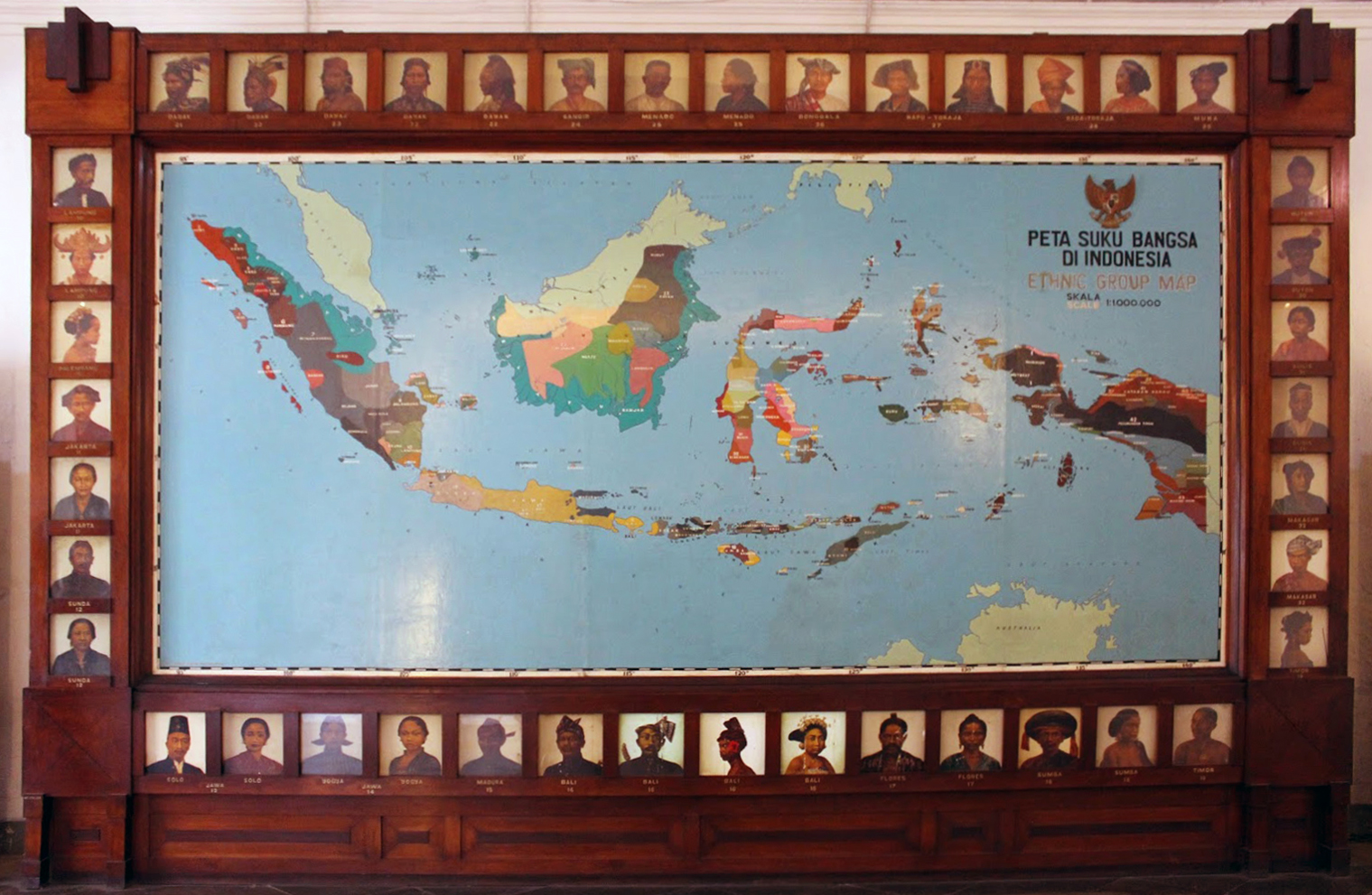
A map in National Museum displaying ethnic distribution and diversity in Indonesia.

Indonesia consists of hundreds of ethnic groups, each of which has different customs, languages, religions, and belief systems. Naturally, that national life related to inter-group interactions, contains the potential for conflicts over such differences in cultural diversity.

=== The territorial aspects of the archipelago ===
The geographic factor, its effects and influences, are the phenomenon that needs to be carefully examined, because Indonesia is rich in various natural resources as well as the diversity of its ethnic groups.

=== Pancasila philosophy ===
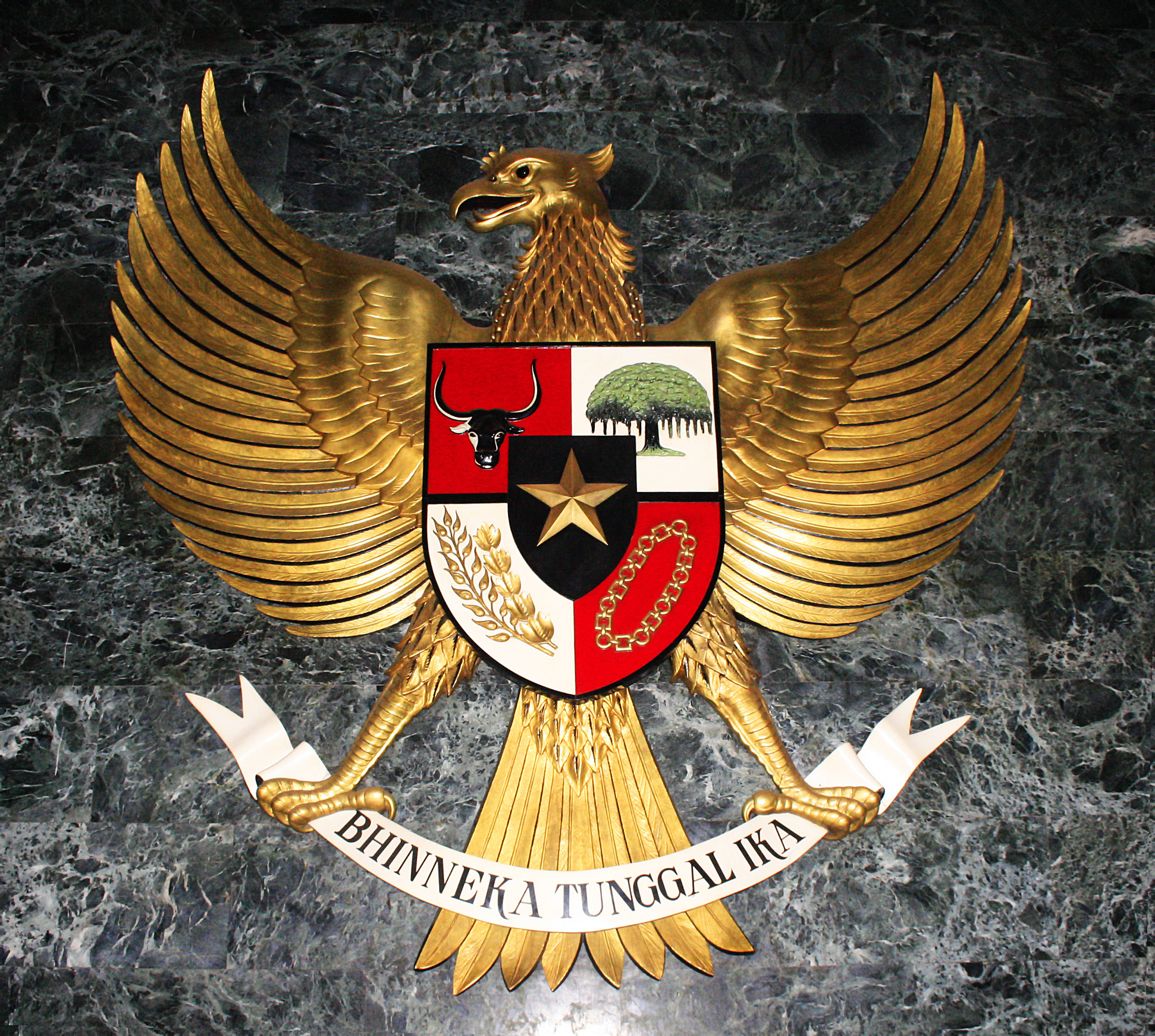
The golden Garuda Pancasila in Monas bearing the symbols of Pancasila, the national ideology of Indonesia.

Pancasila values underlie the development of the wawasan nusantara concept. These values are:

1. Implementation of human rights, such as freedom of religion; providing opportunities to practice worship in accordance with their respective religions.
2. Prioritising the interests of the whole larger society rather than those of individuals or groups.
3. Decision making based on deliberation to reach consensus.

== Purpose ==
Law of Sea Convention as described in Djuanda declaration

1. Wawasan nusantara as a concept of national resilience; namely as a concept in national development, security, defense and territorial aspects.
2. Wawasan nusantara as a development perspective; it has the scope of political unity, economic unity, socio-economic unity, socio-political unity, also defense and security unity.
3. Wawasan nusantara as a vision of national defense and security; as a geopolitical view of Indonesia within the scope of its homeland as a unity that encompasses all of its territory and which protected with all of the might the nation.
4. Wawasan nusantara as territorial vision; which clearly defines Indonesia's national boundaries, to avoid disputes with neighboring countries. Boundaries and challenges of Indonesia are:
- Treatise of the BPUPK session on May 29-June 1, 1945 discussed about the territory of the future Republic of Indonesia and mentioned several opinions of founding fathers. Dr. Soepomo said Indonesia included the boundary of the former Dutch East Indies. Moh. Yamin said that Indonesia includes Sumatra, Java, Lesser Sunda Islands, Borneo, Celebes, Maluku, Malay Peninsula, Timor, and West New Guinea. Sukarno stated that the Indonesian archipelago is an inseparable unit.
- Ordonantie (Dutch Law) 1939, mentioned about the determination of the territorial sea which was along the 3 nautical miles width by drawing along a base line based on the tidal or island/land contour. This provision makes Indonesia not a unitary state, because in many parts of the sea between Indonesian islands (e.g. Java Sea and Banda Sea) there are some international waters that was outside the national jurisdiction.
- Djuanda Declaration, 13 December 1957 constitutes the announcement of the Indonesian government regarding the territorial waters of the Republic of Indonesia, which states:
1. The way to withdraw sea boundaries is no longer based on tidal lines (low water line), but on a straight base line measured from the outline connecting the outermost points of the islands which are included within the territory of the Republic of Indonesia.
2. Determination of territorial waters are increased from 3 nautical miles to 12 nautical miles.
3. Exclusive Economic Zone (EEZ) as an International Law regime, in which the 200-mile archipelagic boundaries are measured from the baseline of Indonesian territorial waters. With the Djuanda Declaration, thus legally and formally Indonesia became a whole and not divided again.

== Objective ==
The purpose of wawasan nusantara consists of two objectives, they are:

1. The national goal, which was written in the Preamble to the 1945 Constitution, explains that the goals of Indonesian independence which are "to protect the whole of the Indonesian people and to create common public welfare, improve national education, and to participate to carrying out world order based on the liberty, eternal peace, and social justice".
2. The inward purpose of is to ensure the unity of all aspects of life both natural and social. It can be concluded that the goal of the Indonesian people is to uphold national interests, as well as regional interests, also to enforce and foster common prosperity, peace, and uphold human dignity throughout the world.

== Implementation ==
=== Political aspect ===
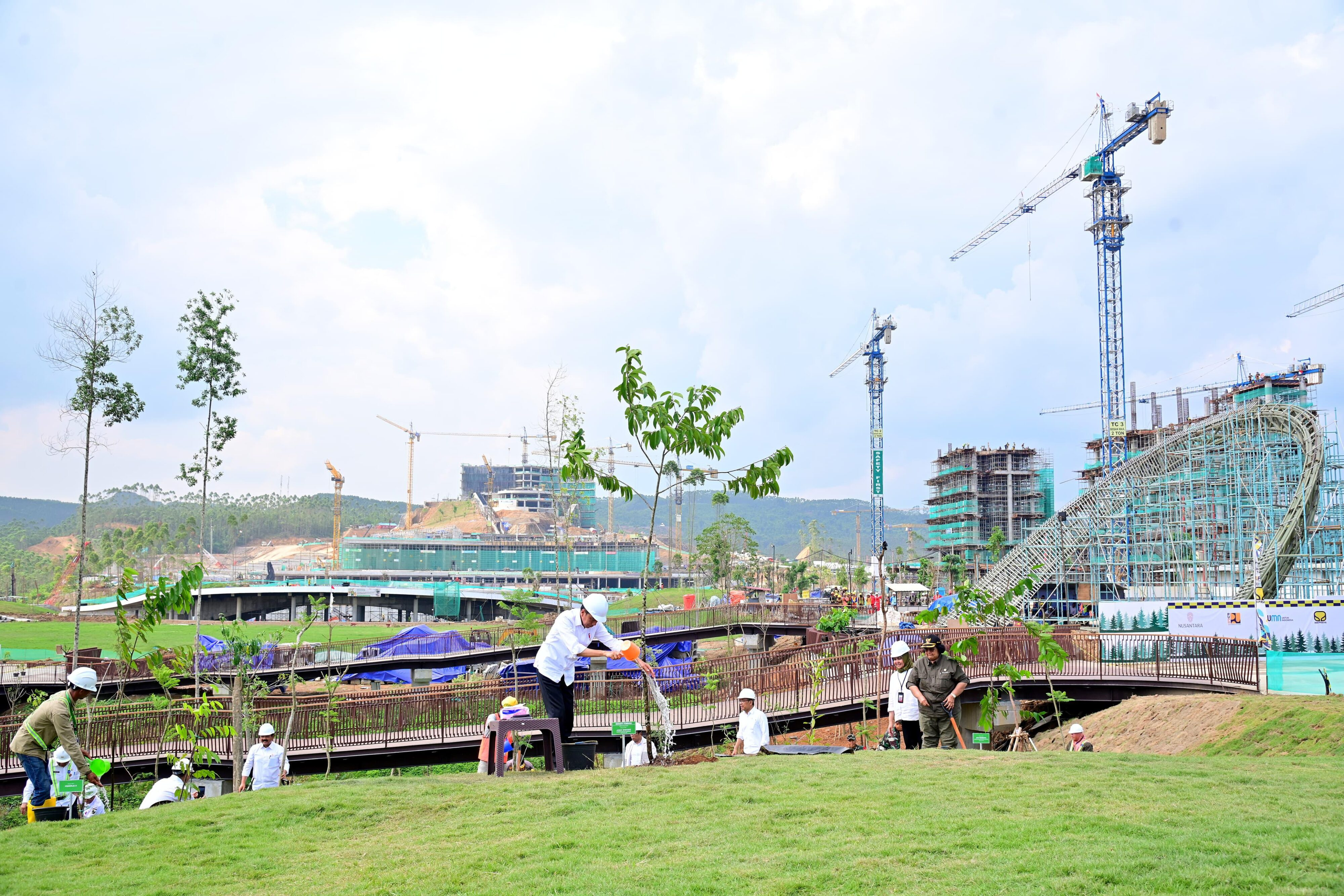
The future capital Nusantara is a strategic move to place the capital city right in the center of the Indonesian archipelago

There are several things that need to be considered in implementing the wawasan nusantara:

1. The implementation of political life is regulated in laws, such as the Political Party Law, the Election Law, and the Presidential Election Law. The implementation of this law must be in accordance with the law and prioritize national unity. For example, in the presidential election, members of the DPR and regional heads must implement democratic principles and justice, so as not to destroy national unity.
2. The implementation of community and state life in Indonesia must be in accordance with applicable law. All Indonesians must have the same legal basis for every citizen, without exception. In Indonesia there are many legal products that can be issued by provinces and districts in the form of regional regulations (perda) that do not conflict with applicable national laws.
3. Developing human rights attitudes and pluralism attitudes to unite different ethnicities, religions, and languages, so as to foster an attitude of tolerance.
4. Strengthen political commitment to political parties and government institutions to enhance the spirit of nationalism, unity and unity.
5. Increasing the role of Indonesia in the international arena and strengthening the diplomatic corps as an effort to safeguard Indonesia's territory, especially the outer islands and uninhabited islands.

=== Economic aspect ===
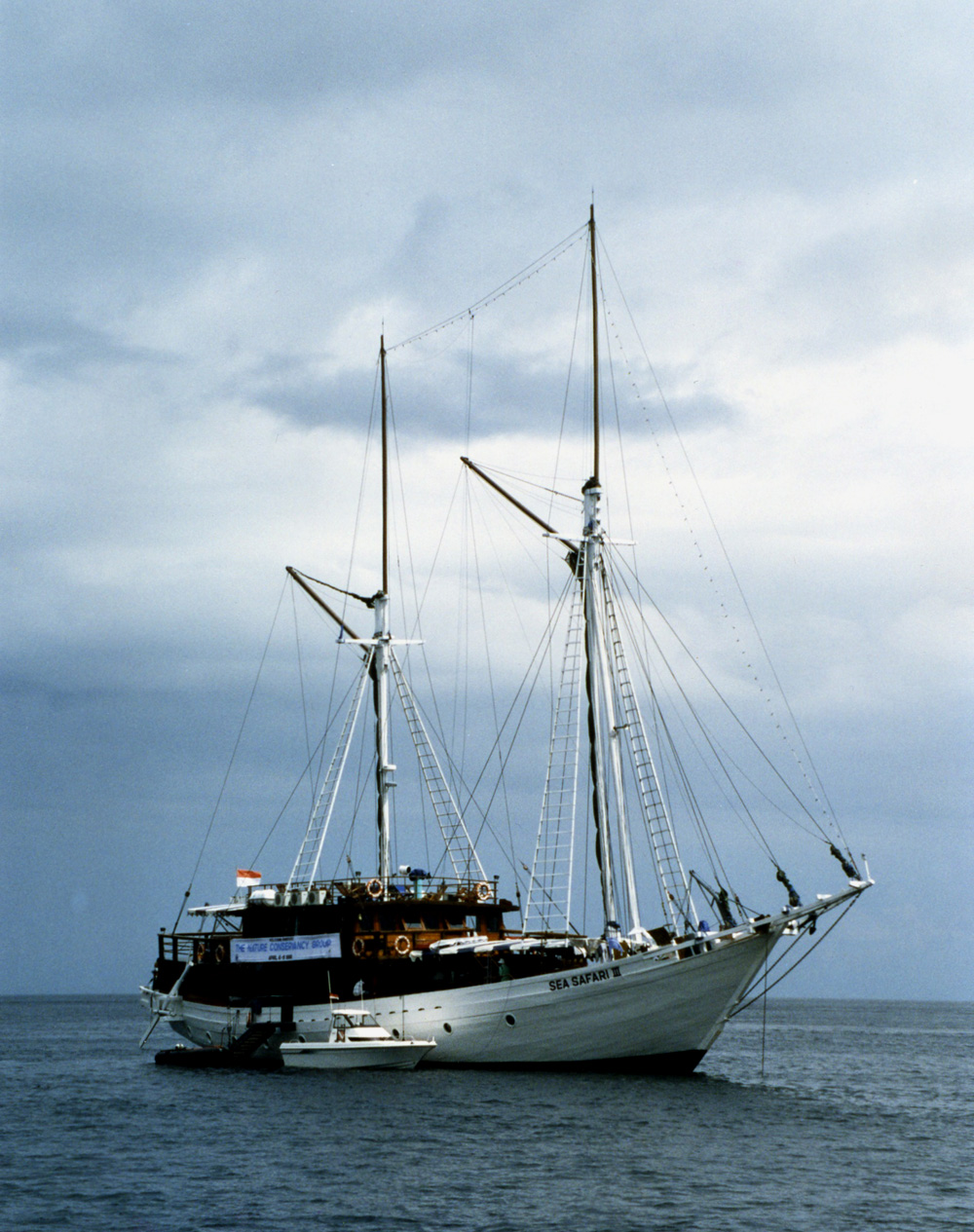
A pinisi tall masted sailing schooner, traditionally connects ports within Indonesian archipelago.

1. The archipelago has a high economic potential, such as the position of the equator, a vast sea area, large tropical forests, large mining and oil products, and has a population in sufficient numbers. Therefore, implementation in economic life must be oriented to the government, agriculture and industry sectors.
2. Economic development must pay attention to fairness and balance between regions. Therefore, the existence of regional autonomy can create efforts in economic justice.
3. Economic development must involve people's participation, such as by providing micro credit facilities in the development of small businesses.

=== Socio-cultural aspect ===
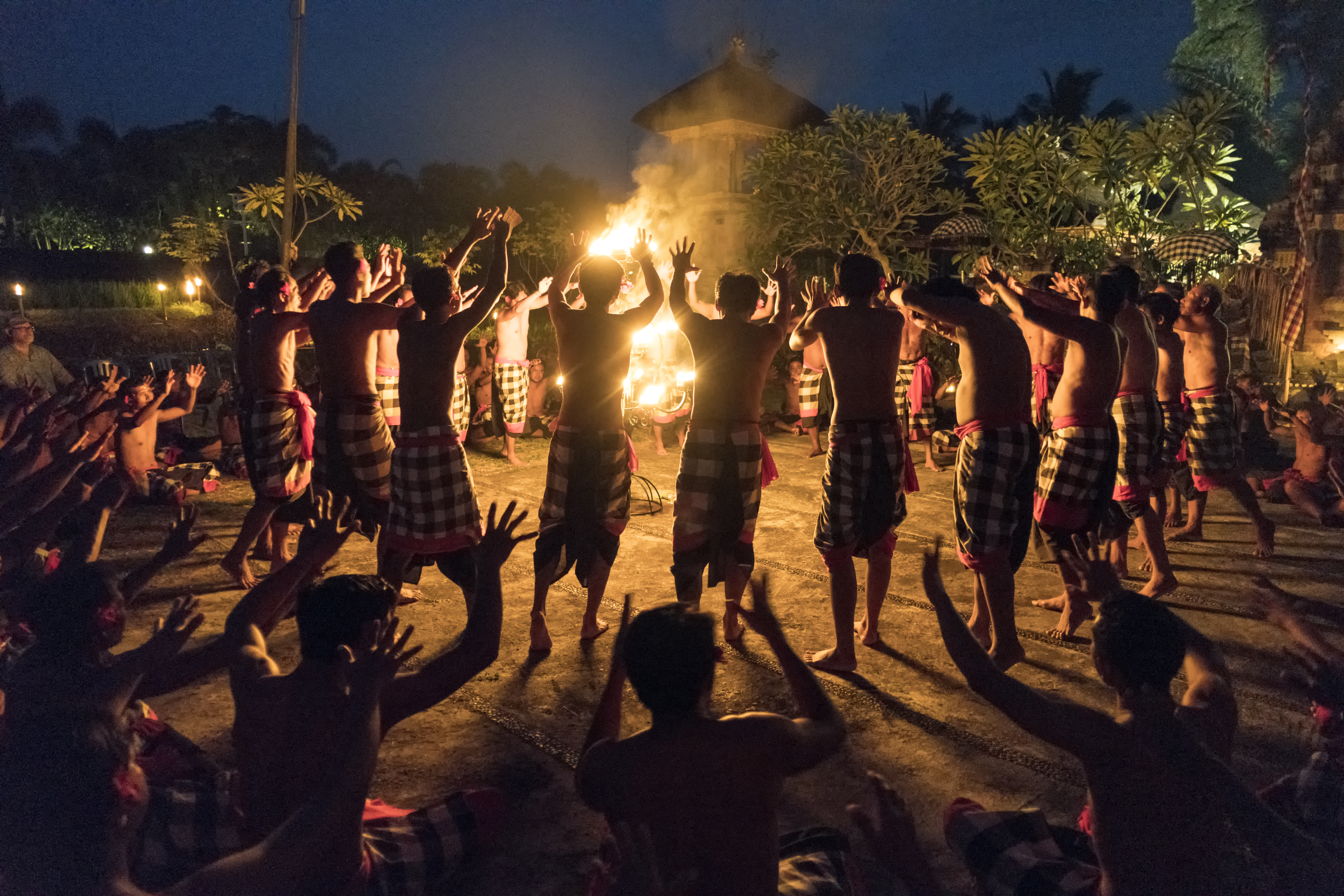
Preserving cultural diversity to strengthen national identity as well as become a tourism attraction, such as the kecak dance in Bali.

Some things to consider in social and cultural life, namely:

1. Developing a harmonious national life between different communities; in terms of culture, social status, and region. For example, with equal distribution of education in all regions and compulsory education programs which must prioritising disadvantaged regions.
2. Development of Indonesian culture, to preserve and nurture the cultural diversity of Indonesia, that can be employed as a tourism attraction that provide the economic value for the region. For example, with cultural preservation, museum and cultural sites development.

=== Defense and security aspect ===
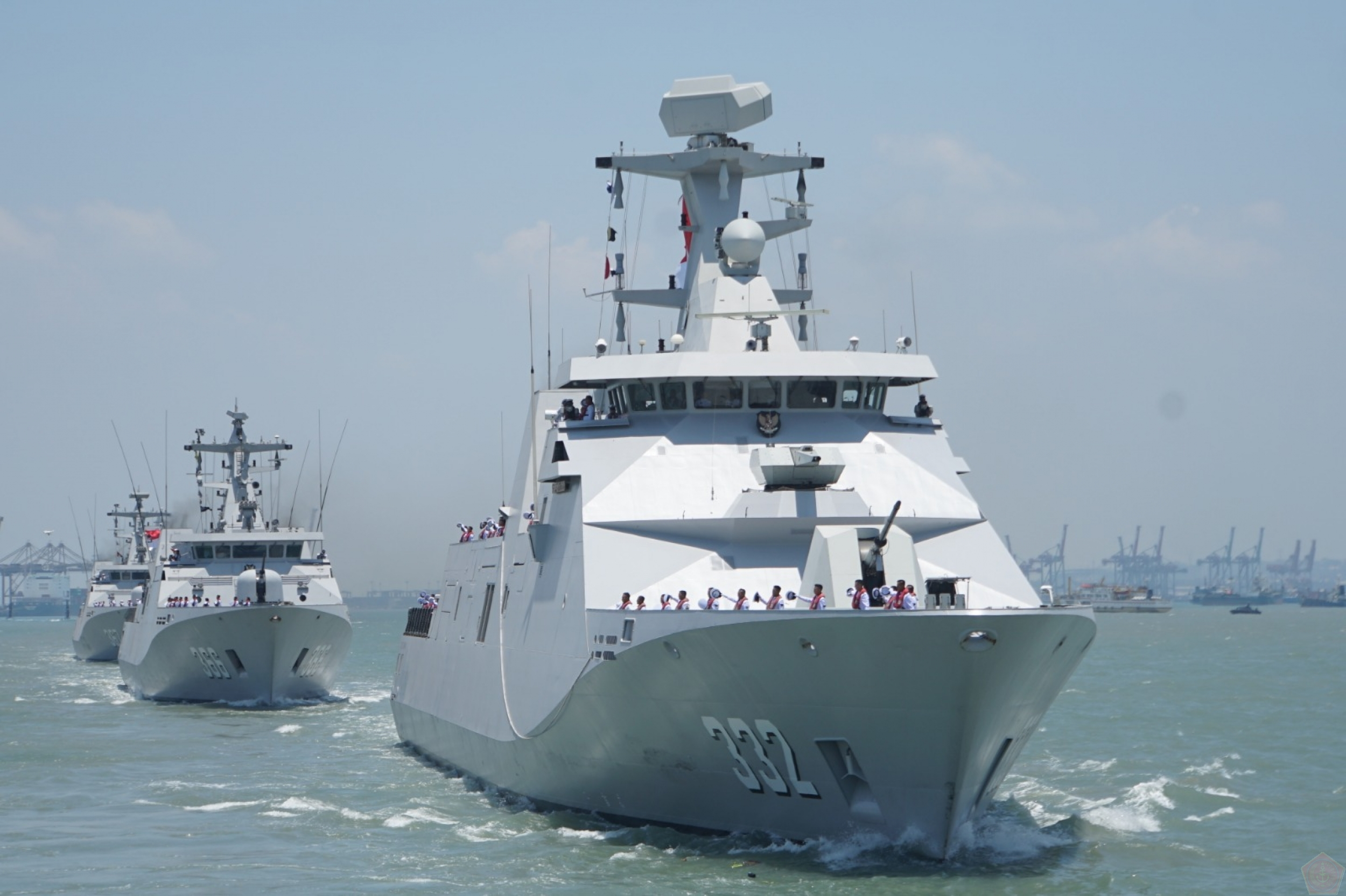
Building a professional TNI armed force and enhancing naval capabilities, facilities and infrastructures, are the implementation in the defense and security aspect.

Some things to consider in the defense and security aspect, namely:

1. Defense and security development activities must provide an opportunity for every citizen to participate. Such activities such as maintaining a residential order, improving social discipline, reporting security matters to the authorities are the citizen's obligations.
2. Building a sense of national unity, so that the threat of an area or island is perceived as a threat to the whole nation. This sense of national unity can be created by building solidarity and close relations between citizens of different regions.
3. Building a professional TNI armed force and providing adequate facilities and infrastructure for security activities in the territory of Indonesia, especially the outer islands and border regions of Indonesia.

== See also ==
- Indonesia Vision 2045
- Nusantara
- Greater Indonesia
- Military history of Indonesia
- Nine-dash line
- Territorial disputes in the South China Sea
- Ambalat
- Djuanda declaration
