= Ministry of National Development Planning =

Government ministry of Indonesia

Ministry of National Development Planning/National Development Planning Agency
- Kementerian Perencanaan Pembangunan Nasional/Badan Perencanaan Pembangunan Nasional
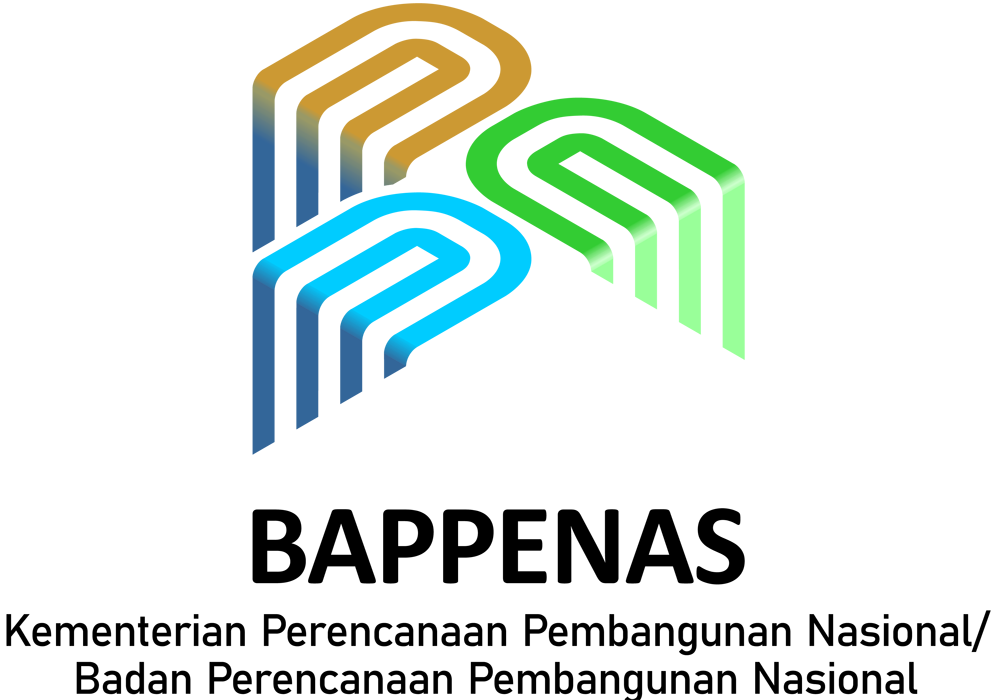

Ministry overview
- Formed: 12 April 1947; 79 years ago
- Jurisdiction: Government of Indonesia
- Headquarters: Jalan Taman Suropati No. 2 Jakarta 10310, Indonesia
- Minister responsible: Rachmat Pambudy, Minister for National Development Planning/Head of the National Development Planning Agency
- Deputy Minister responsible: Febrian Alphyanto Ruddyard, deputy Minister for National Development Planning/Head of the National Development Planning Agency
- Website: www.bappenas.go.id

The Ministry of National Development Planning/National Development Planning Agency (Indonesian: Kementerian Perencanaan Pembangunan Nasional/Badan Perencanaan Pembangunan Nasional) (abbreviated PPN/Bappenas) is a ministry of the Republic of Indonesia that has the task to oversee government affairs in the field of national development planning to assist the President in organizing state government. The minister is responsible to the President. The Ministry of National Development Planning uses organizational units and resources within the National Development Planning Agency.

The current Minister for National Development Planning, which is ex officio also the Head of the National Development Planning Agency, is Rachmat Pambudy, appointed by President Prabowo Subianto on 21 October 2024.

== History ==
After independence of Indonesia, the Planning Board was established on 12 April 1947. The board formulated Indonesia's first development planning document, called the Dasar-dasar Pokok Daripada Plan Mengatur Ekonomi Indonesia (Basic Plan for Developing Indonesia's Economy). On 7 January 1952, it became the Badan Perancang Negara (State Development Agency), which formulated Indonesia's first 5-year plan, namely the development plan for 1956–1960. The term Bappenas originated from Presidential Decree Number 12 of 1963, which integrated the Depernas into the working cabinet. Functions of Bappenas is guided by Law No. 25 of 2004 and the Long-Term National Development Planning Law No. 17 of 2007.

== Functions ==
The Ministry of National Development Planning organizes functions:

1. Formulation and determination of policies in the field of national development planning, national development strategies, sectoral, cross-sectoral and cross-regional policy directions, as well as macroeconomic framework that includes a comprehensive picture of the economy including fiscal policy direction, regulatory framework, institutions, and funding;
2. Coordination and synchronization of policy implementation in the field of national development planning and budgeting;
3. Fostering and providing administrative support to all elements of the organization within the Ministry of National Development Planning;
4. Management of state property / assets that are the responsibility of the Ministry of National Development Planning; and
5. Oversight of the implementation of tasks within the Ministry of National Development Planning.

== Organizational structure ==
Based on Presidential Decrees No. 194/2024, and as expanded by Ministry of National Development Planning Decree 2/2025, the organizational structure of the Ministry of National Development Planning is:

1. Office of the Minister of National Development Planning (concurrent post with Chief of National Development Planning Agency)
2. Office of the Deputy Minister of National Development Planning (concurrent post with Vice Chief of National Development Planning Agency)
3. Ministry Secretariat
  1. Office of the Ministerial Secretary of the Ministry of National Development Planning (concurrent post with Main Secretary of National Development Planning Agency)
4. Expert Staff of Regional Development Equity
5. Expert Staff of Social Affairs and Poverty Countermeasure
6. Expert Staff of Development of Leading Sectors and Digital Innovation
7. Expert Staff of Institutional Relationship
8. Expert Staff of Development Funding Innovation

Based on Presidential Regulation Decrees No. 195/2024, and as expanded by Ministry of National Development Planning Decree 2/2025, the organizational structure of the Ministry of National Development Planning is:

1. Office of the Chief of National Development Planning Agency
2. Office of the Vice Chief of National Development Planning Agency
3. Main Secretariat
  1. Office of Main Secretary of National Development Planning Agency
    1. Bureau of Public Relations, Archives, and Leadership Administration
    2. Bureau of Human Resources
    3. Bureau of Legal Affairs
    4. Bureau of Planning, Organization, and Procedures
    5. Bureau of General Affairs
4. Deputy for Macrodevelopment Planning (Deputy I)
  1. Directorate of Macroeconomy Planning and Development of Development Models
  2. Directorate of Fiscal, Monetary, and Financial Development Planning
  3. Directorate of Downstreaming and International Economics Partnership
  4. Directorate of Productivity Enhancement and Thematic Development Planning
  5. Directorate of Synergy and Development Management
5. Deputy for Regional Development (Deputy II)
  1. Directorate of Regional Governance, Regional Finance, and Regional Transfer
  2. Directorate of Spatial Management, Urban Affairs, Agrarian, and Disaster Management
  3. Directorate of Village Affairs, Affirmed Regions, and Transmigration
  4. Directorate of Western Indonesian Development
  5. Directorate of Eastern Indonesian Development
6. Deputy for Economy and Digital Transformation (Deputy III)
  1. Directorate of Industry, Trade, and Investment
  2. Directorate of Tourism, Creative Economy, and Digital Economy
  3. Directorate of Sharia Economy and State-owned Enterprises (SOEs)
  4. Directorate of Digital Infrastructures, Ecosystem, and Security
  5. Directorate of Development Data and Digital Government
7. Deputy for Politics, Law, Human Rights Defense, and Security (Deputy IV)
  1. Directorate of Ideology, Statehood, Politics, and Democracy
  2. Directorate of Legal, Human Rights, Immigration, and Correction Development
  3. Directorate of Defense and Security
  4. Directorate of Foreign Relations
  5. Directorate of Bureaucratic Transformation and Government
8. Deputy for Community Development, Population, and Manpower Affairs (Deputy V)
  1. Directorate of Poverty Countermeasures and Social Welfare
  2. Directorate of Manpower
  3. Directorate of Population and Social Security
  4. Directorate of Social and Economic Independence
  5. Directorate of Cooperatives and Micro, Small, Medium Businesses and Enterprises (MSMBEs)
9. Deputy for Development of Human and Cultural Affairs (Deputy VI)
  1. Directorate of Health and Public Nutrition
  2. Directorate of Primary and Secondary Education
  3. Directorate of Higher Education, Science, and Technology
  4. Directorate of Family, Parenting, Women, and Children
  5. Directorate of Religion, Culture, Youth, and Sports
10. Deputy for Foods, Natural Resources, and Environment (Deputy VII)
  1. Directorate of Foods and Agriculture
  2. Directorate of Marine Affairs and Fisheries
  3. Directorate of Energy Resources, Minerals, and Mining
  4. Directorate of The Environment
  5. Directorate of Forestry and Water Resources Conservation
11. Deputy for Infrastructure (Deputy VIII)
  1. Directorate of Infrastructure Development Partnership and Integrity
  2. Directorate of Connectivity and Logistics Infrastructure
  3. Directorate of Water Resources
  4. Directorate of Housings and Settlement Infrastructures
  5. Directorate of Transmission, Electricity, Aeronautics, and Space Affairs
12. Deputy for Funding of Development (Deputy IX)
  1. Directorate of Funding Strategy and Development Investment
  2. Directorate of Central Government and Regional Government Funding Allocation
  3. Directorate of Foreign Funding and Grants
  4. Directorate of Domestic Funding and Grants
  5. Directorate of Funding for Strategic and Innovative Development
13. Deputy for Monitoring, Evaluation, and Control of Development (Deputy X)
  1. Directorate of System and Risk Management
  2. Directorate of Control and Strategic Policies Evaluation I (Political, Legal, Defense, Security, Government Administration, Welfare, and Equity)
  3. Directorate of Control and Strategic Policies Evaluation II (Food, Water, Energy, and Environment)
  4. Directorate of Control and Strategic Policies Evaluation III (Infrastructure, Economics, and Digital Transformation)
  5. Directorate of Control and Strategic Policies Evaluation IV (Human Resources Development, Society, Culture, Gender Equality, and Inclusivity)
14. Main Inspectorate
  1. Financial Accountability Inspectorate
  2. Institutional Performance Inspectorate
  3. Investigative Inspectorate
15. Centers
  1. Center for Fostering, Education, and Training for National Development Planning Human Resources
  2. Center for National Development Planning System, Data, and Information
  3. Center for Policy Analysis and Performance Analysis

Aside of these offices, the ministry also possessed several agencies under the ministry coordination:

1. Geospatial Information Agency (Indonesian: Badan Informasi Geospasial)
2. National Public Procurement Agency (Indonesian: Lembaga Kebijakan Pengadaan Barang/Jasa Pemerintah)

== See also ==
- Administrative divisions of Indonesia
- Indonesia Vision 2045

== Bibliography ==
Mustopadidjaja AR et al. 2012. Bappenas dalam Sejarah Perencanaan Pembangunan Indonesia 1945-2025 [Bappenas in the History of Development Planning in Indonesia]. Jakarta: LP3ES. ISBN 978 979 3330 97 6
