= Dewan Rakyat committees =

The following is the list of members of Dewan Rakyat committees, which comprise Committee of Selection, House Committee, Standing Orders Committee, Committee of Privileges and Public Accounts Committee. The list of committee members from the first to the 13th Parliament, however, reflect those of Selection Committee only.

== 15th Parliament ==
=== Committee of Selection ===
Member	Party	Constituency	Date of appointment
Johari Abdul, chairman	PH (PKR)	–	14 February 2023
Fadillah Yusof	GPS (PBB)	Petra Jaya	14 February 2023
Anthony Loke Siew Fook	PH (DAP)	Seremban	14 February 2023
Aminuddin Harun	PH (PKR)	Port Dickson	28 August 2025
Azalina Othman Said	BN (UMNO)	Pengerang	14 February 2023
Hamzah Zainudin	PN (BERSATU)	Larut	14 February 2023
Takiyuddin Hassan	PN (PAS)	Kota Bharu	14 February 2023

=== House Committee ===
Member	Party	Constituency	Date of appointment
Johari Abdul, chairman	-	–	22 February 2023
Mohd Isam Mohd Isa	BN (UMNO)	Tampin	22 February 2023
Doris Sophia Brodi	GPS (PRS)	Sri Aman	22 February 2023
Lo Su Fui	GRS (PBS)	Tawau	22 February 2023
Khoo Poay Tiong	PH (DAP)	Kota Melaka	22 February 2023
Shahidan Kassim	PN (PAS)	Arau	22 February 2023
Ronald Kiandee	PN (BERSATU)	Beluran	22 February 2023

=== Standing Orders Committee ===
Member	Party	Constituency	Date of appointment
Johari Abdul, chairman	-	–	22 February 2023
Johari Abdul Ghani	BN (UMNO)	Titiwangsa	22 February 2023
William Leong Jee Keen	PH (PKR)	Selayang	22 February 2023
Roy Angau Gingkoi	GPS (PRS)	Lubok Antu	22 February 2023
Kulasegaran Murugeson	PH (DAP)	Ipoh Barat	22 February 2023
Mas Ermieyati Samsudin	PN (BERSATU)	Masjid Tanah	22 February 2023
Mumtaz Md. Nawi	PN (PAS)	Tumpat	22 February 2023

=== Committee of Privileges ===
Member	Party	Constituency	Date of appointment
Johari Abdul, chairman	-	–	22 February 2023
Noraini Ahmad	BN (UMNO)	Parit Sulong	22 February 2023
Dzulkefly Ahmad	PH (AMANAH)	Kuala Selangor	22 February 2023
Henry Sum Agong	GPS (PBB)	Lawas	22 February 2023
Syed Saddiq Syed Abdul Rahman	MUDA	Muar	22 February 2023
Mohd Radzi Md Jidin	PN (BERSATU)	Putrajaya	22 February 2023
Idris Ahmad	PN (PAS)	Bagan Serai	22 February 2023

== 14th Parliament ==
=== Committee of Selection ===
Member	Party	Constituency	Date of appointment
Azhar Azizan Harun, chairman	-	–	13 July 2020
Mohamed Azmin Ali	PN (BERSATU)	Gombak	13 July 2020
Fadillah Yusof	GPS (PBB)	Petra Jaya	13 July 2020
Hamzah Zainudin	PN (BERSATU)	Larut	13 July 2020
Ahmad Zahid Hamidi	BN (UMNO)	Bagan Datuk	13 July 2020
Abdul Hadi Awang	PN (PAS)	Marang	13 July 2020
Anwar Ibrahim	PH (PKR)	Port Dickson	13 July 2020

=== House Committee ===
Member	Party	Constituency	Date of appointment
Azhar Azizan Harun, chairman	-	–	
Mas Ermieyati Samsudin	PN (BERSATU)	Masjid Tanah	
Shahidan Kassim	BN (UMNO)	Arau	
Abdul Latiff Abd Rahman	PN (PAS)	Kuala Krai	
Tiong King Sing	GPS (PDP)	Bintulu	
Alice Lau Kiong Yieng	PH (DAP)	Lanang	
Mohd Hatta Md Ramli	PH (AMANAH)	Lumut	

=== Standing Orders Committee ===
Member	Party	Constituency	Date of appointment
Azhar Azizan Harun, chairman	-	–	
Wan Junaidi Tuanku Jaafar	GPS (PBB)	Santubong	
Ahmad Amzad Hashim	PN (PAS)	Kuala Terengganu	
Azizah Mohd Dun	PN (BERSATU)	Beaufort	
Ahmad Nazlan Idris	BN (UMNO)	Jerantut	
Xavier Jayakumar Arulanandam	PBM	Kuala Langat	
Hannah Yeoh	PH (DAP)	Segambut	

=== Committee of Privileges ===
Member	Party	Constituency	Date of appointment
Azhar Azizan Harun, chairman	-	–	
Mohd Fasiah Mohd Fakeh	PN (BERSATU)	Sabak Bernam	
Mohamad Alamin	BN (UMNO)	Kimanis	
Nik Muhammad Zawawi Salleh	PN (PAS)	Pasir Puteh	
Wilson Ugak Kumbong	GPS (PRS)	Hulu Rajang	
Shamsul Iskandar Mohd Akin	PH (PKR)	Hang Tuah Jaya	
Ramkarpal Singh Karpal Singh	PH (DAP)	Bukit Gelugor	

== 13th Parliament ==
Member	Party	Constituency	Date of appointment
Ahmad Zahid Hamidi	BN (UMNO)	Bagan Datok	19 October 2015
Anwar Ibrahim	PKR	Permatang Pauh	18 July 2013
Joseph Entulu Belaun	BN (PRS)	Selangau	18 July 2013
Lim Kit Siang	DAP	Gelang Patah	18 July 2013
Liow Tiong Lai	BN (MCA)	Bentong	18 July 2013
Muhyiddin Yassin	BN (UMNO)	Pagoh	18 July 2013
Palanivel Govindasamy	BN (MIC)	Cameron Highlands	18 July 2013
Pandikar Amin Mulia, chairman	BN (UMNO)	–	18 July 2013
Subramaniam Sathasivam	BN (MIC)	Segamat	19 October 2015
Wan Azizah Wan Ismail	PKR	Permatang Pauh	19 October 2015

== 12th Parliament ==
Member	Party	Constituency	Date of appointment
Anwar Ibrahim	PKR	Permatang Pauh	18 December 2008
Bernard Giluk Dompok	BN (UPKO)	Penampang	26 May 2008
Lim Kit Siang	DAP	Ipoh Timor	26 May 2008
Muhyiddin Yassin	BN (UMNO)	Pagoh	15 December 2009
Najib Razak	BN (UMNO)	Pekan	26 May 2008
Ong Ka Ting	BN (MCA)	Kulai	26 May 2008
Pandikar Amin Mulia, chairman	BN (UMNO)	–	26 May 2008
Subramaniam Sathasivam	BN (MIC)	Segamat	26 May 2008
Wan Azizah Wan Ismail	PKR	Permatang Pauh	26 May 2008

== 11th Parliament ==
Member	Party	Constituency	Date of appointment
Bernard Giluk Dompok	BN (UPKO)	Ranau	24 May 2004
Leo Michael Toyad	BN (PBB)	Mukah	24 May 2004
Lim Kit Siang	DAP	Ipoh Timor	24 May 2004
Mohamed Zahir Ismail, chairman	BN (UMNO)	–	24 May 2004
Najib Razak	BN (UMNO)	Pekan	24 May 2004
Ong Ka Ting	BN (MCA)	Tanjong Piai	24 May 2004
Ramli Ngah Talib, chairman	BN (UMNO)	Pasir Salak	
Samy Vellu	BN (MIC)	Sungai Siput	24 May 2004

== 10th Parliament ==
Member	Party	Constituency	Date of appointment
Abdullah Ahmad Badawi	BN (UMNO)	Kepala Batas	15 February 2000
Fadzil Noor	PAS	Pendang	15 February 2000
Leo Moggie Irok	BN (PBDS)	Kanowit	15 February 2000
Ling Liong Sik	BN (MCA)	Labis	15 February 2000
Mohamed Zahir Ismail, chairman	BN (UMNO)	–	15 February 2000
Osu Sukam	BN (UMNO)	Papar	15 February 2000
Samy Vellu	BN (MIC)	Sungai Siput	15 February 2000

== 9th Parliament ==
Member	Party	Constituency	Date of appointment
Anwar Ibrahim	BN (UMNO)	Permatang Pauh	12 June 1995
Leo Moggie Irok	BN (PBDS)	Kanowit	12 June 1995
Lim Kit Siang	DAP	Tanjong	12 June 1995
Ling Liong Sik	BN (MCA)	Labis	12 June 1995
Mohamed Zahir Ismail, chairman	BN (UMNO)	–	12 June 1995
Osu Sukam	BN (UMNO)	Papar	12 June 1995
Samy Vellu	BN (MIC)	Sungai Siput	12 June 1995

== 8th Parliament ==
Member	Party	Constituency	Date of appointment
Abdul Ghafar Baba	BN (UMNO)	Jasin	5 December 1990
Leo Moggie Irok	BN (PBDS)	Kanowit	5 December 1990
Lim Kit Siang	DAP	Tanjong	5 December 1990
Ling Liong Sik	BN (MCA)	Labis	5 December 1990
Mohamed Zahir Ismail, chairman	BN (UMNO)	–	5 December 1990
Sakaran Dandai	BN (UMNO)	Semporna	5 December 1990
Samy Vellu	BN (MIC)	Sungai Siput	5 December 1990

== 7th Parliament ==
Member	Party	Constituency	Date of appointment
Abdul Ghafar Baba	BN (UMNO)	Jasin	8 October 1986
Kasitah Gaddam	BN (USNO)	Kinabalu	8 October 1986
Leo Moggie Irok	BN (PBDS)	Kanowit	8 October 1986
Lim Kit Siang	DAP	Tanjong	8 October 1986
Ling Liong Sik	BN (MCA)	Labis	8 October 1986
Mohamed Zahir Ismail, chairman	BN (UMNO)	–	8 October 1986
Samy Vellu	BN (MIC)	Sungai Siput	8 October 1986

== 6th Parliament ==
Member	Party	Constituency	Date of appointment
Lee San Choon	BN (MCA)	Seremban	12 October 1982
Leo Moggie Irok	BN (SNAP)	Kanowit	12 October 1982
Lim Kit Siang	DAP	Kota Melaka	12 October 1982
Mohamed Zahir Ismail, chairman	BN (UMNO)	–	12 October 1982
Musa Hitam	BN (UMNO)	Panti	12 October 1982
Pengiran Othman Pengiran Rauf	BN (BERJAYA)	Kimanis	12 October 1982
Samy Vellu	BN (MIC)	Sungei Siput	12 October 1982

== 5th Parliament ==
Member	Party	Constituency	Date of appointment
Lee San Choon	BN (MCA)	Segamat	11 October 1978
Leo Moggie Irok	BN (SNAP)	Kanowit	11 October 1978
Lim Kit Siang	DAP	Petaling	11 October 1978
Mahathir Mohamad	BN (UMNO)	Kubang Pasu	11 October 1978
Musa Hitam	BN (UMNO)	Labis	3 November 1981
Ong Kee Hui	BN (SUPP)	Bandar Kuching	11 October 1978
Samy Vellu	BN (MIC)	Sungei Siput	3 November 1981
Syed Nasir Ismail, chairman	BN (UMNO)	–	11 October 1978
V. Manickavasagam	BN (MIC)	Pelabuhan Kelang	11 October 1978

== 4th Parliament ==
Member	Party	Constituency	Date of appointment
Edmund Langgu Saga	SNAP	Saratok	6 November 1974
Lee San Choon	BN (MCA)	Segamat	6 November 1974
Mohamad Asri Muda	BN (PAS)	Nilam Puri	6 November 1974
Mohamed Yaacob	BN (UMNO)	Tanah Merah	6 November 1974
Nik Ahmad Kamil Nik Mahmood, chairman	BN (UMNO)	–	6 November 1974
V. Manickavasagam	BN (MIC)	Pelabuhan Kelang	6 November 1974

== 3rd Parliament ==
Member	Party	Constituency	Date of appointment
Chen Man Hin	DAP	Seremban Timor	9 March 1971
Chik Mohamed Yusuf Sheikh Abdul Rahman, chairman	Alliance (UMNO)	–	9 March 1971
Ismail Abdul Rahman	Alliance (UMNO)	Johore Timor	9 March 1971
Mohamad Asri Muda	PMIP	Kota Bharu Hulu	9 March 1971
Mohamed Ghazali Jawi	Alliance (UMNO)	Kuala Kangsar	9 March 1971
Tan Siew Sin	Alliance (MCA)	Malacca Tengah	9 March 1971
V. Manickavasagam	Alliance (MIC)	Klang	9 March 1971

== 2nd Parliament ==
Member	Party	Constituency	Date of appointment
Abdul Razak Hussein	Alliance (UMNO)	Pekan	20 May 1964; 26 May 1965; 15 June 1966; 15 June 1967; 6 June 1968
Chia Chin Shin		Sarawak	15 June 1966; 15 June 1967; 6 June 1968
Chik Mohamed Yusuf Sheikh Abdul Rahman, chairman	Alliance (UMNO)	–	20 May 1964; 26 May 1965; 15 June 1966; 15 June 1967; 6 June 1968
Ismail Abdul Rahman	Alliance (UMNO)	Johore Timor	20 May 1964; 26 May 1965; 15 June 1966
Khir Johari	Alliance (UMNO)	Kedah Tengah	15 June 1967; 6 June 1968
Mohamad Asri Muda	PMIP	Pasir Puteh	20 May 1964; 26 May 1965; 15 June 1966; 15 June 1967; 6 June 1968
S. Rajaratnam	PAP	Singapore	20 May 1964; 26 May 1965
Tan Siew Sin	Alliance (MCA)	Malacca Tengah	20 May 1964; 26 May 1965; 15 June 1966; 15 June 1967; 6 June 1968
V. Manickavasagam	Alliance (MIC)	Klang	20 May 1964; 26 May 1965; 15 June 1966; 15 June 1967; 6 June 1968

== 1st Parliament ==
Member	Party	Constituency	Date of appointment
Abdul Razak Hussein	Alliance (UMNO)	Pekan	12 September 1959; 20 April 1960; 20 April 1961; 26 April 1962; 23 May 1963
Ahmad Boestamam	Socialist Front (Ra'ayat)	Setapak	12 September 1959; 20 April 1960; 26 April 1962
Burhanuddin al-Helmy	PMIP	Besut	12 September 1959; 20 April 1960; 20 April 1961; 26 April 1962; 23 May 1963
Ismail Abdul Rahman	Alliance (UMNO)	Johore Timor	26 April 1962; 23 May 1963
Karam Singh Veriah	Socialist Front (Ra'ayat)	Damansara	20 April 1961
Lim Kean Siew	Socialist Front (Labour)	Dato' Kramat	23 May 1963
Mohamad Noah Omar, chairman	Alliance (UMNO)	Johore Bahru Timor	12 September 1959; 20 April 1960; 20 April 1961; 26 April 1962; 23 May 1963
Ong Yoke Lin	Alliance (MCA)	Ulu Selangor	12 September 1959; 20 April 1960; 20 April 1961; 26 April 1962; 23 May 1963
Sulaiman Abdul Rahman	Alliance (UMNO)	Muar Selatan	12 September 1959; 20 April 1960; 20 April 1961
V. Manickavasagam	Alliance (MIC)	Klang	12 September 1959; 20 April 1960; 20 April 1961; 26 April 1962; 23 May 1963
