= Committee of Privileges (Malaysian House of Representatives) =

The seal of the Houses of Representatives.

The Committee of Privileges (Malay: Jawatankuasa Hak dan Kebebasan) is a select committee of the House of Representatives in the Parliament of Malaysia. The committee is headed by the Speaker, and six members appointed by the Committee of Selection at the beginning of each Parliament. It is responsible for considering matters concerning the Houses of Representatives.

The committee is responsible for matters pertaining to the parliament while it is in session. Any members of parliament can notify the Speaker on matters that affects the privileges accorded to Parliament, of which requires the Speaker's approval before being handed to the committee, where they will issue a statement on the matter.

== Membership ==
=== 14th Parliament ===
As of April 2021, the member of the committee are as follows:

| Member | Party | Constituency |
|---|---|---|
| Azhar Azizan Harun (Chairperson) | Independent | – |
| Fasiah Fakeh MP | PN | Sabak Bernam |
| Mohamad Alamin MP | PN | Kimanis |
| Nik Muhammad Zawawi Salleh MP | PAS | Pasir Puteh |
| Wilson Ugak Kumbong | GPS | Hulu Rajang |
| Shamsul Iskandar Md. Akin MP | PKR | Hang Tuah Jaya |
| Ramkarpal Singh MP | DAP | Bukit Gelugor |

Up to December 2019, the members of the committee are as follows:

| Member | Party | Constituency |
|---|---|---|
| Mohamad Ariff Md Yusof (Chairperson) | Independent | – |
| Abdul Latiff Ahmad MP | BERSATU | Mersing |
| Shamsul Iskandar Md. Akin MP | PKR | Hang Tuah Jaya |
| Sivakumar Varatharaju Naidu MP | DAP | Batu Gajah |
| Ahmad Hassan MP | WARISAN | Papar |
| Ismail Sabri Yaakob MP | UMNO | Bera |
| Khairuddin Razali MP | PAS | Kuala Nerus |

Former members of the committee are as follows:

| Member | Party | Constituency | Successor |
|---|---|---|---|
| Abdullah Sani Abdul Hamid MP | PKR | Kapar | Shamsul Iskandar Md. Akin |
| Mohamed Farid Md Rafik MP | BERSATU | Tanjung Piai | Abdul Latiff Ahmad |

== See also ==
- Parliamentary Committees of Malaysia
