= Parliamentary committees of Malaysia =

Committee meetings take place in committee rooms at the Malaysian Houses of Parliament, often in front of press and media or in private sessions

The Parliamentary Select Committees of Malaysia are sub-legislative bodies each consisting of small number of Members of Parliament (MPs) from the House of Representatives, or senators from the Senate, or a mix of both appointed to deal with particular areas or issues; most are made up of members of the Representatives. appointed to deal with particular areas or issues. The majority of parliamentary committees are Select committees. It was first announced in August 2018 by Mohamad Ariff Md Yusof, Speaker of the House of Representatives, that six new parliamentary select committees will be established, before later announcing in April 2019 a massive reformation of the Malaysian parliamentary institution with a further planned eleven new select committees, each focusing on particular ministries or governmental agencies. Prior to the 14th session of parliament, only five permanent and two temporary committees had been in operation. The remit of these committees vary depending on whether they are committees of the House of Representatives or the Senate.

The creation of four new select committees were announced by the Minister in the Prime Minister's Department in charge of legal affairs, Liew Vui Keong, on 17 October 2019.

== House of Representatives ==

=== Select Committees ===
- Departmental (Dept) select committees are designed to oversee and examine the work of individual government departments and any related departmental bodies and agencies.
- Topical select committees examine topical issues of importance.
- Internal select committees have responsibility with respect to the day-to-day running of Parliament.

=== 15th Parliament ===
Departmental select committees
Committee	Established	Chairperson				Responsibility
Committee	Established	Name	Constituency	Coalition (party)	Since	Responsibility
Finance and Economy	4 April 2023	Mohd Shahar Abdullah	Paya Besar	BN (UMNO)	4 April 2023	Ministry of Finance; Ministry of Economy; Ministry of Investment, Trade and Industry; Prime Minister's Department
Health	4 April 2023	Suhaizan Kayat	Pulai	PH (AMANAH)	11 March 2024	Ministry of Health
Entrepreneurship, Costs of Living and Agriculture	4 April 2023	Cha Kee Chin	Rasah	PH (DAP)	4 April 2023	Minister of Entrepreneur Development and Cooperative; Ministry of Domestic Trade and Cost of Living; Ministry of Agriculture and Food Security
Infrastructure, Transport and Communications	4 April 2023	Yusuf Abd. Wahab	Tanjong Manis	GPS (PBB)	4 April 2023	Ministry of Works; Ministry of Transport; Ministry of Communications; Ministry of Digital; Ministry of Rural and Regional Development; Ministry of Local Government Development; Prime Minister's Department
Nation Building, Education and Human Resource Development	4 April 2023	Saifuddin Abdullah	Indera Mahkota	PN (BERSATU)	4 April 2023	Ministry of Tourism, Arts and Culture; Ministry of Education; Ministry of Higher Education; Ministry of Human Resources; Ministry of Communications; Ministry of Youth and Sports
Environment, Science and Plantation	4 April 2023	Ahmad Amzad Mohamed @ Hashim	Kuala Terengganu	PN (PAS)	4 April 2023	Ministry of Natural Resources and Environmental Sustainability; Ministry of Energy Transition and Water Transformation; Ministry of Science, Technology and Innovation; Ministry of Plantation and Commodities
Security	4 April 2023	Jonathan Yasin	Ranau	GRS	4 April 2023	Ministry of Home Affairs; Ministry of Defence; Prime Minister's Department
International Trade and Relations	4 April 2023	Wong Chen	Subang	PH (PKR)	4 April 2023	Ministry of Foreign Affairs; Ministry of Investment, Trade and Industry; Ministry of Economy
Human Rights, Elections and Institutional Reforms	4 April 2023	William Leong Jee Keen	Selayang	PH (PKR)	4 April 2023	Prime Minister's Department; Attorney General Chambers; Election Commission
Women, Children and Community Development	4 April 2023	Yeo Bee Yin	Puchong	PH (DAP)	4 April 2023	Ministry of Women, Family and Community Development; Ministry of Youth and Sports; Ministry of Rural and Regional Development; Ministry of National Unity

Internal select committees
Committee	Established	Chair				Responsibility
Committee	Established	Name	Constituency	Coalition (party)	Since	Responsibility
Committee of Selection	1959	Johari Abdul	None	PH (PKR)	14 February 2023	Notify the House when a member becomes a member of a particular Committee by issuing a statement
House Committee	1959	Johari Abdul	None	PH (PKR)	22 February 2023	Advises the Chairman on all matters related to all the conveniences, services and privileges of the House
Committee of Privileges	1959	Johari Abdul	None	PH (PKR)	22 February 2023	Considers matters concerning to the House and issues statements
Standing Orders Committee	1959	Johari Abdul	None	PH (PKR)	22 February 2023	Consider from time to time and report on all matters relating to the Standing Orders which may be referred to it by the House

=== 14th Parliament ===
Departmental select committees
Committee	Established	Chair		Responsibility
Committee	Established	Name	Since	Responsibility
Agriculture, Fishery and Natural Resources	TBA	TBA	TBA	Ministry of Agriculture and Agro-based Industry, Ministry of Water, Land and Natural Resources and related bodies
Budget	4 December 2018	Mustapa Mohamed	4 December 2018	Ministry of Finance, Ministry of Economic Affairs and related bodies
Defence and Home Affairs	4 December 2018	Nik Nazmi Nik Ahmad	4 December 2019	Ministry of Defence, Ministry of Home Affairs and related bodies
Economy, Urban Affairs, Rural	TBA	TBA	TBA	Ministry of Housing and Local Government, Ministry of Rural Development and related bodies
Elections	17 October 2019 (Note: A similar select committee was established in October 2011, however, in that instance the committee was temporary and only functioned for a six-month timeframe.)	Syed Ibrahim Syed Noh	4 December 2019	Election Commission of Malaysia and associated bodies
Gender Equality and Family Development	4 December 2018 (Note: The Gender Equality and Family Development Select Committee was initially created as the Rights and Gender Equality Select Committee before the human rights portfolio was moved to the Human Rights and Constitutional Affairs Select Committee on 17 October 2019.)	Nor Azrina Surip	4 December 2018	Ministry of Women, Family and Community Development and related bodies
Health, Education, Community and Social Development	TBA	TBA	TBA	Ministry of Education, Ministry of Health and related bodies
Human Resource	TBA	TBA	TBA	Ministry of Human Resources and related bodies
Integrity and Anti-Corruption	TBA	TBA	TBA	Malaysian Anti-Corruption Commission and associated bodies
International Relations and Trade	17 October 2019	Wong Chen	4 December 2019	Ministry of Domestic Trade and Consumer Affairs, Ministry of International Trade and Industry, Ministry of Foreign Affairs and related bodies
Science, Innovation and Environment	17 October 2019	Fadillah Yusof	4 December 2019	Ministry of Energy, Science, Technology, Environment and Climate Change and related bodies
Transportation and Communication	TBA	TBA	TBA	Ministry of Transport, Ministry of Communications and Multimedia and related bodies
Works	TBA	TBA	TBA	Ministry of Works and related bodies

Topical select committees
Committee	Established	Chair		Responsibility
Committee	Established	Name	Since	Responsibility
Consideration of Bills	4 December 2018	Ramkarpal Singh Karpal Singh	18 July 2019	
Federal-State Relations	4 December 2018	Hassan Abdul Karim	4 December 2018	
Human Rights and Constitutional Affairs	17 October 2019	Charles Anthony Santiago	4 December 2019	
Major Public Appointments	4 December 2018	William Leong	4 December 2018	Examine government-linked companies (GLC) that use ministries’ budget for their business purpose
Public Accounts	1959	Wong Kah Woh	27 August 2020	Examines government and parliamentary expenditure to ensure honesty and fairness

Internal select committees
Committee	Established	Chair		Responsibility
Committee	Established	Name	Since	Responsibility
House Committee	1959	Azhar Azizan Harun	13 July 2020	Advises the Chairman on all matters related to all the conveniences, services and privileges of the House
Committee of Privileges	1959	Azhar Azizan Harun	13 July 2020	Considers matters concerning to the House and issues statements
Committee of Selection	1959	Azhar Azizan Harun	13 July 2020	Notify the House when a member becomes a member of a particular Committee by issuing a statement
Standing Orders Committee	1959	Azhar Azizan Harun	13 July 2020	Consider from time to time and report on all matters relating to the Standing Orders which may be referred to it by the House

Causus Committee
Committee	Established	Chair		Responsibility
Committee	Established	Name	Since	Responsibility
Caucus on Reform and Governance	4 December 2018	Anwar Ibrahim	4 December 2018	Empowering the parliament as branch of the government responsible in instituting reforms in all aspects of the administration

== Senate ==

=== Internal ===
- House Committee
- Committee of Privileges
- Committee of Selection
- Standing Orders Committee

== Former committees ==
=== Representatives ===
- Select Committee On Lynas Advanced Materials Plant (LAMP) - abolished 20 June 2012 following expiration of three-month time frame
