= House Committee =

A house committee is a type of committee existing in several legislatures. It may refer to

- House Committee (Malaysian House of Representatives)
- House Committee (Malaysian Senate)
- House Committee (Parliament of the United Kingdom)
- House Committee (United States House of Representatives)
- House Committee (Israel)
