= Gender Equality and Family Development Select Committee =

Committee appointed by the Malaysian House of Representatives

The Gender Equality and Family Development Select Committee (Malay: Jawatankuasa Pilihan Khas Kesaksamaan Gender dan Pembangunan Keluarga; Chinese: 馬來西亞性別平等與家庭發展專責委員會; Tamil: மலேசிய பாலின சமத்துவம் மற்றும் குடும்ப மேம்பாட்டு சிறப்பு தேர்வுக் குழு) is a select committee of the Malaysian House of Representatives. It is among six new bipartisan parliamentary select committees announced by Speaker of the House of Representatives, Mohamad Ariff Md Yusof, on 4 December 2018 in an effort to improve the institutional system. It was previously known as the Human Rights and Gender Equality Select Committee before the Human Rights and Constitutional Affairs Select Committee was set up on 17 October 2019.

== Membership ==
=== 14th Parliament ===
As of December 2019, the committee's current members are as follows:

Member	Party	Constituency
Nor Aziana Surip MP (Chairman)	PKR	Merbok
Maria Chin Abdullah MP	PKR	Petaling Jaya
Ahmad Fahmi Mohamed Fadzil MP	PKR	Lembah Pantai
Mastura Mohd Yazid MP	UMNO	Kuala Kangsar
Siti Zailah Mohd Yusoff MP	PAS	Rantau Panjang
Kasthuriraani Patto MP	DAP	Batu Kawan
Ma'mun Sulaiman MP	WARISAN	Kalabakan

Former members of the committee are as follows:

Member	Party	Constituency	Successor
Charles Anthony Santiago MP	DAP	Klang	Maria Chin Abdullah

== Chair of the Gender Equality and Family Development Select Committee ==
Chair	Party	Constituency	First elected	Method
Nor Aziana Surip	PKR	Merbok	4 December 2018	Elected by the Speaker of the House of Representatives

== See also ==
- Parliamentary Committees of Malaysia
