= Committee of Selection =

Committee of Selection may refer to:

- Committee of Selection (House of Commons), a select committee in the Parliament of the United Kingdom
- Committee of Selection (House of Lords), a committee in the Parliament of the United Kingdom
- Committee of Selection (Malaysian House of Representatives), a committee in the Parliament of Malaysia
- Committee of Selection (Malaysian Senate), a committee in the Parliament of Malaysia

== See also ==
- Selection Committee
