= Caucus on Reform and Governance =

Committee appointed by the Malaysian House of Representatives

The Caucus on Reform and Governance Committee (Malay: Kaukus Mengenai Pembaharuan dan Tadbir Urus; Chinese: 馬來西亞改革與治理委員會核心小組; Tamil: மலேசியாவின் சீர்திருத்தம் மற்றும் நிர்வாகக் குழு குறித்த காகஸ்) is a select committee of the Malaysian House of Representatives, which seeks to empower the parliament as branch of the government responsible in instituting reforms in all aspects of the administration. It is the only caucus announced by Speaker of the House of Representatives, Mohamad Ariff Md Yusof, on 4 December 2018 in an effort to improve the institutional system.

== Recommendations ==
Anwar Ibrahim told reporters in late January 2019 that the inaugural meeting of the caucus had recommended that the annual Human Rights Commission of Malaysia (SUHAKAM) report be debated in the lower and upper Houses. It was also recommended that the Chief Justice of Malaysia head an independent panel overlooking legislative reforms.

Following allegations of interference in the judicial system, the caucus' deputy chair, Lim Kit Siang, announced that the caucus decided to support calls for the establishment of a Royal Commission of Inquiry (RCI) to look into the claims.

== Membership ==
=== 14th Parliament ===
As of December 2018, the Committee's current members are as follows:

Member	Party	Position	Constituency
Anwar Ibrahim MP	PKR	Chairperson	Port Dickson
Kit Siang Lim MP	DAP	Deputy Chairperson	Iskandar Puteri
Johari Abdul MP	PKR	Member	Sungai Petani
Mohamed Nazri Abdul Aziz MP	UMNO	Member	Padang Rengas
Maria Chin Abdullah MP	PKR	Member	Petaling Jaya
Edmund Santhara Kumar Ramanaidu MP	PKR	Member	Segamat
Mohamed Hanipa Maidin MP	AMANAH	Member	Sepang
Mustapa Mohamed MP	BERSATU	Member	Jeli
Azalina Othman Said MP	UMNO	Member	Pengerang
Ma'mun Sulaiman MP	WARISAN	Member	Kalabakan
Tuan Ibrahim Tuan Man MP	PAS	Member	Kubang Kerian
Wan Junaidi Tuanku Jaafar MP	PBB	Member	Santubong

== Chair of the Caucus on Reform and Governance Committee ==
Chair	Party	Constituency	First elected	Method
Anwar Ibrahim	PKR	Port Dickson	4 December 2018	Elected by the Speaker of the House of Representatives

== Deputy Chair of the Caucus on Reform and Governance Committee ==
Chair	Party	Constituency	First elected	Method
Lim Kit Siang	DAP	Iskandar Puteri	4 December 2018	Elected by the Speaker of the House of Representatives

== See also ==
- Parliamentary Committees of Malaysia
