= Standing Orders Committee (Malaysian House of Representatives) =

The Standing Orders Committee (Malay: Jawatankuasa Peraturan Mesyuarat; simplified Chinese: 马来西亚下议院常务委员会; traditional Chinese: 馬來西亞下議院常務委員會; Tamil: மலேசிய குடிமக்களுக்கான ஸ்டாண்டிங் கமிட்டி) is a select committee of the House of Representatives in the Parliament of Malaysia. The remit of the committee is to consider from time to time and report on all matters relating to the Standing Orders which may be referred to it by the House.

== Membership ==
=== 14th Parliament ===
As of April 2019, the members of the committee are as follows:

Member	Party	Constituency
Mohamad Ariff Md Yusof MP (Chair)	AMANAH	-
Shahruddin Md Salleh MP	BERSATU	Sri Gading
Hannah Yeoh MP	DAP	Segambut
Sivarasa Rasiah MP	PKR	Sungai Buloh
Tze Tzin Sim MP	PKR	Bayan Baru
Ismail Mohamed Said MP	UMNO	Kuala Krau
Ahmad Amzad Mohamed Hashim MP	PAS	Kuala Terengganu

Former members of the committee are as follows:

Member	Party	Constituency	Successor
Azman Ismail MP	PKR	Kuala Kedah	Sivarasa Rasiah
Mansor Othman MP	PKR	Nibong Tebal	Sim Tze Tzin

== See also ==
- Parliamentary Committees of Malaysia
