= Standing Orders Committee (Malaysian Senate) =

The Standing Orders Committee (Malay: Jawatankuasa Peraturan Mesyuarat; simplified Chinese: 马来西亚上议院常务委员会; traditional Chinese: 馬來西亞上議院常務委員會; Tamil: மலேசிய நிருபர் நிலை) is a select committee of the Senate in the Parliament of Malaysia that considers from time to time and report on all matters relating to the Standing Orders which may be referred to it by the Senate.

== Membership ==
=== 14th Parliament ===
As of April 2019, the members of the committee are as follows:

Member	Party
Vigneswaran Sanasee (Chair)	MIC
Hui Ying Lim	DAP
Alan Ling	DAP
Rahimah Mahamad	UMNO
Raj Munni Sabu	AMANAH
Lian Ker Ti	MCA
Vacant	

== See also ==
- Parliamentary Committees of Malaysia
