= Rajasthan Coaching Centres (Control and Regulation) Act, 2025 =

State law

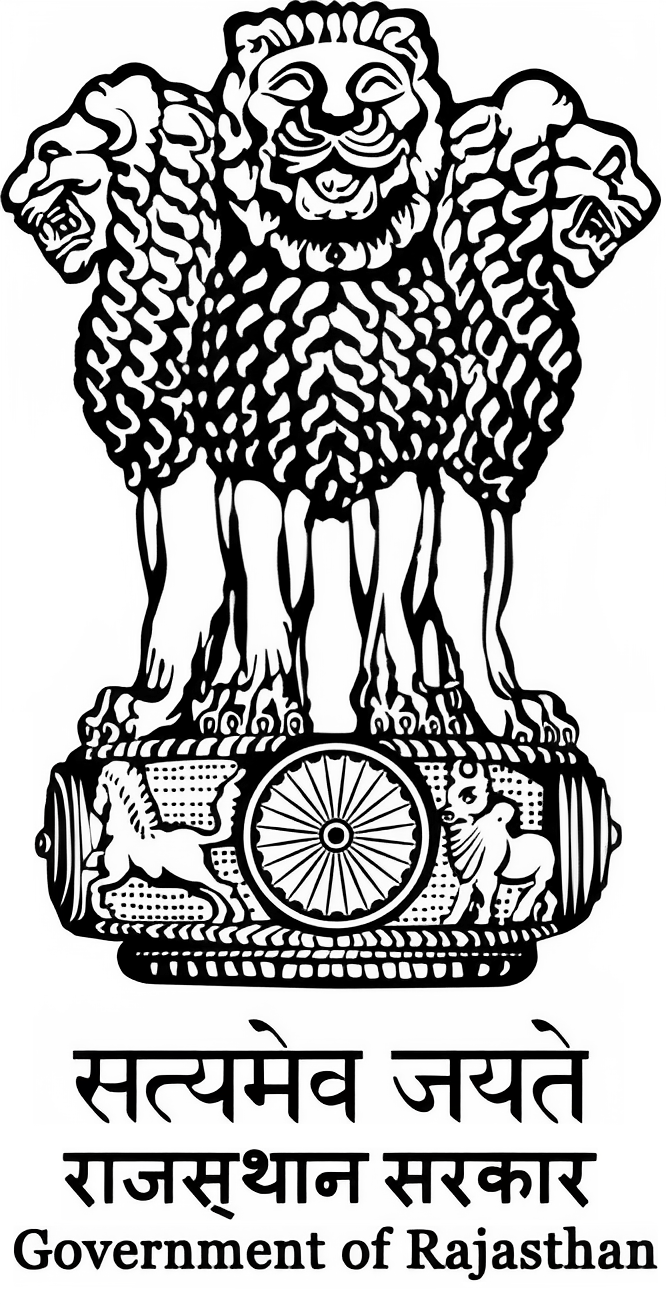

Rajasthan Legislative Assembly
- Citation: Bill No. 11, Year 2025
- Territorial extent: Rajasthan
- Enacted by: Rajasthan Legislative Assembly
- Signed by: Haribhau Kishanrao Bagade (Governor)

Legislative history
- Bill title: The Rajasthan Coaching Centres (Control and Regulation) Act, 2025
- Introduced: 19/03/2025
- Committee responsible: Select committee (parliamentary system)
- Status: Pending

The Rajasthan Coaching Centres (Control and Regulation) Bill, 2025 is a proposed legislative act in the Indian state of Rajasthan designed to regulate the operation of educational coaching centers within the state.

== See also ==
- Coaching
- Education in India
