= Electoral Reform Select Committee =

Committee appointed by the Malaysian House of Representatives

The Electoral Reform Select Committee is a select committee of the Malaysian House of Representatives, which study the matters related to the election process in Malaysia. It was first announced by Speaker of the House of Representatives Mohamad Ariff Md Yusof in April 2019 that a new select committee for electoral reform was to be set up. However, it is noted that an electoral reform select committee previously existed between October 2011 and April 2012. Unlike the yet-to-be-confirmed select committee, the temporary committee was not designed to study bills.

The creation of the new Elections Select Committee was among four new select committees announced by the Minister in the Prime Minister's Department in charge of legal affairs, Liew Vui Keong, on 17 October 2019.

== Report ==
The report from the special select committee for electoral reform (2011-2012) is available on its website: .

== Membership ==
=== 14th Parliament ===
As of December 2019, the members of the committee are as follows:

Member	Party	Constituency
Syed Ibrahim Syed Noh MP (Chairman)	PKR	Ledang
Mohamed Nazri Abdul Aziz MP	UMNO	Padang Rengas
Takiyuddin Hassan MP	PAS	Kota Bharu
Natrah Ismail MP	PKR	Sekijang
Poay Tiong Khoo MP	DAP	Kota Melaka
Ronald Kiandee MP	BERSATU	Beluran
Jugah Muyang MP	PKR	Lubok Antu

=== 12th Parliament ===
This temporary select committee had a six-month time frame to complete its report on improving the electoral system from the date of its establishment. The responsibility, role and duty of the committee were to strengthen the Election Commission of Malaysia (EC) and on fair and free election process by studying associated useful matters. The special select committee had to complete and table a report as well as submitting related recommendations to the House for approval or according to any orders from the House.

Member	Party	Constituency
Maximus Johnity Ongkili MP (Chairman)	PBS	Kota Marudu
Mohd Radzi Sheikh Ahmad MP	UMNO	Kangar
Chan Onn Fong MP	MCA	Alor Gajah
Alexander Nanta Linggi MP	PBB	Kapit
Kamalanathan Panchanathan MP	MIC	Hulu Selangor
Mohamed Azmin Ali MP	PKR	Gombak
Siew Fook Loke MP	DAP	Rasah
Mohd Hatta Md. Ramli MP	PAS	Kuala Krai
Choo Keong Wee MP	IND	Wangsa Maju

== Chair of the Consideration of Bills Select Committee ==
Chair	Party	Constituency	First elected	Method
Maximus Ongkili	PBS	Kota Marudu	3 October 2011	Elected by the Speaker of the House of Representatives
Syed Ibrahim Syed Noh	PKR	Ledang	4 December 2019	Elected by the Speaker of the House of Representatives

== See also ==
- Parliamentary Committees of Malaysia
