= Committee of Privileges (Malaysian Senate) =

Select committee of the Senate in the Parliament of Malaysia

The Committee of Privileges (Malay: Jawatankuasa Hak dan Kebebasan; simplified Chinese: 马来西亚上议院特权委员会; traditional Chinese: 馬來西亞上議院特權委員會; Tamil: மலேசிய மன்றத்தின் பிரபுக்களின் பிரகடனம் குழு) is a select committee of the Senate in the Parliament of Malaysia that considers any matter which appears to affect the powers and privileges of the Senate and issues a statement regarding the matter to the Senate.

== Membership ==
=== 14th Parliament ===
As of April 2019, the members of the committee are as follows:

Member	Party
Vigneswaran Sanasee (chair)	MIC
Asmak Husin	PAS
Mohd Yusmadi Mohd Yusoff	PKR
Vacant	
Vacant	

== See also ==
- Parliamentary Committees of Malaysia
