= Science, Innovation and Environment Select Committee =

Committee appointed by the Malaysian House of Representatives

The Science, Innovation and Environment Select Committee (Malay: Jawatankuasa Pilihan Khas Sains, Inovasi dan Alam Sekitar; Chinese: 馬來西亞科學，創新與環境專責委員會; Tamil: மலேசிய அறிவியல், கண்டுபிடிப்பு மற்றும் சுற்றுச்சூழல் பணிக்குழு) is a select committee of the Malaysian House of Representatives, which scrutinises the Ministry of Science, Technology and Innovation (MOSTI). It is among four new bipartisan parliamentary select committees announced by the Minister in the Prime Minister's Department in charge of legal affairs, Liew Vui Keong, on 17 October 2019 in an effort to improve the institutional system.

== Membership ==
=== 14th Parliament ===
As of December 2019, the committee's current members are as follows:

Member	Party	Constituency
Fadillah Yusof MP (chairman)	PBB	Petra Jaya
Awang Hashim MP	PAS	Pendang
Azman Ismail MP	PKR	Kuala Kedah
Ahmad Maslan MP	UMNO	Pontian
Awang Husaini Sahari MP	PKR	Putatan
Tack Wong MP	DAP	Bentong
Vivian Shir Yee Wong MP	DAP	Sandakan

== Chair of the Science, Innovation and Environment Select Committee ==
Chair	Party	Constituency	First elected	Method
Fadillah Yusof	PBB	Petra Jaya	5 December 2019	Elected by the Speaker of the House of Representatives

== See also ==
- Parliamentary Committees of Malaysia
