= House Committee (Malaysian House of Representatives) =

The House Committee (Malay: Jawatankuasa Dewan; simplified Chinese: 马来西亚下议院内务委员会; traditional Chinese: 馬來西亞下議院內務委員會; Tamil: மலேசிய ஹவுஸ் ஆஃப் காமன்ஸ் ஹவுஸ் கமிட்டி) is a select committee of the House of Representatives in the Parliament of Malaysia. The remit of the committee is to advise the Chair on all matters related to all the conveniences, services and privileges of the House.

== Membership ==
=== 14th Parliament ===
As of December 2019, the members of the committee are as follows:

Member	Party	Constituency
Mohamad Ariff Md Yusof MP (Chair)	AMANAH	–
Mohamed Hanipa Maidin MP	AMANAH	Sepang
Johari Abdul MP	PKR	Sungai Petani
Abdullah Sani Abdul Hamid MP	PKR	Kapar
Mahdzir Khalid MP	UMNO	Padang Terap
Alice Lau MP	DAP	Lanang
Tuan Ibrahim Tuan Man MP	PAS	Kubang Kerian

Former members of the committee are as follows:

Member	Party	Constituency	Successor
Nurul Izzah Anwar MP	PKR	Permatang Pauh	Abdullah Sani Abdul Hamid
Azalina Othman Said MP	UMNO	Pengerang	Mahdzir Khalid

== See also ==
- Parliamentary Committees of Malaysia
