= House Committee (Malaysian Senate) =

The House Committee (Malay: Jawatankuasa Dewan; simplified Chinese: 马来西亚上议院内务委员会; traditional Chinese: 馬來西亞上議院內務委員會; Tamil: ஹவுஸ் ஆஃப் லார்ட்ஸ் ஹவுஸ் கமிட்டி) is a select committee of the Senate in the Parliament of Malaysia that set policy and provided guidance for long-term planning for the House, supervised its finances, and supervised the scheme for members' expenses.

== Membership ==
=== 14th Parliament ===
As of April 2019, the members of the committee are as follows:

Member	Party
Vigneswaran Sanasee (Chair)	MIC
Rahemah Idris	UMNO
Razali Idris	BERSATU
Fahariyah Md. Nordin	UMNO
Megat Zulkarnain Omardin	UMNO

== See also ==
- Parliamentary Committees of Malaysia
