= Petra Jaya (federal constituency) =

Federal constituency of Sarawak, Malaysia

Petra Jaya (P194)
Sarawak constituency

Federal constituency
- Legislature: Dewan Rakyat
- MP: Fadillah Yusof; GPS
- Constituency created: 1987
- First contested: 1990
- Last contested: 2022

Demographics
- Population (2020): 150,813
- Electors (2022): 109,809
- Area (km²): 126
- Pop. density (per km²): 1,196.9

Petra Jaya is a federal constituency in Kuching Division (Kuching District), Sarawak, Malaysia, that has been represented in the Dewan Rakyat since 1990.

The federal constituency was created in the 1987 redistribution and is mandated to return a single member to the Dewan Rakyat under the first past the post voting system.

== Demographics ==
https://ge15.orientaldaily.com.my/seats/sarawak/p

Ethnic breakdown of Petra Jaya's electorate as of 2022
1. Malay-Muslim bumiputera (73.6%)
2. Chinese (13.1%)
3. Sarawak bumiputera (12.5%)
4. Other ethnicities (0.80%)

As of 2020, Petra Jaya has a population of 150,813 people.

Age breakdown of Petra Jaya's electorate as of 2022
1. 18-20 (7.47%)
2. 21-29 (23.9%)
3. 30-39 (22.6%)
4. 40-49 (17.0%)
5. 50-59 (13.9%)
6. 60-69 (9.29%)
7. 70-79 (4.27%)
8. 80-89 (1.30%)
9. above 90 (0.31%)
Gender breakdown of Petra Jaya's electorate as of 2022
1. Male (49.0%)
2. Female (51.0%)

== History ==
=== Polling districts ===
According to the gazette issued on 31 October 2022, the Petra Jaya constituency has a total of 25 polling districts.

State constituency	Polling Districts	Code	Location
Tupong（N06）	Tupong	194/06/01	SK Rakyat Tupong; Tabika Kemas Kpg. Tupong Tengah
Tupong（N06）	Gita	194/06/02	SMK Tuanku Abdul Rahman Jln. Matang; Dewan Serbaguna Kpg. Pinang Jawa
Tupong（N06）	Sungai Tengah	194/06/03	SJK (C) Sungai Tengah Jln. Sungei Tengah Matang; Dewan Serbaguna Kpg. Sagah; Dewan Serbaguna Datuk Amar Dr Sulaiman Daud Kpg. Kolong Dua; SK Tan Sri Datuk Haji Mohamed Taman Malihah; Dewan Serbaguna Taman Malihah
Tupong（N06）	Rahmat	194/06/04	SK Gita; Perkarangan Tempat Kereta Taman Hussein / Rahmat
Tupong（N06）	Sinjan	194/06/05	Dewan Sri Tanjong Kpg. Tanjong
Tupong（N06）	Sejoli	194/06/06	SK Tan Sri Dr Hj Sulaiman Daud; SMK Petra Jaya
Tupong（N06）	Paroh	194/06/07	Dewan Serbaguna Kpg Paroh
Tupong（N06）	Matang	194/06/08	SJK (C) Chung Hua Batu 7 Jln. Matang; SMK Matang; SK Matang; Dewan Pendidikan dan Sosial Kpg. Matang Batu 10 Jln. Matang; SK Matang Jaya; SK Petra Jaya; Dewan Serbaguna Taman Heng Guan
Tupong（N06）	Sri Wangi	194/06/09	Pusat Latihan ABIM Taman Sri Wangi Petra Jaya
Samariang (N07)	Samariang	194/07/01	SK Samariang Kpg. Samariang Batu; Surau Darul Amin Samariang Jaya, Fasa 2
Samariang (N07)	Lintang	194/07/02	SK Encik Buyong
Samariang (N07)	Kandis	194/07/03	Kolej Datuk Patinggi Abang Abdillah
Samariang (N07)	Semerah Padi	194/07/04	SMK Semerah Padi
Samariang (N07)	Sukma	194/07/05	SK Madrasah Datuk Hj Abdul Kadir Hasan; Dewan Temenggong, Kpg. Semariang Baru Fasa III
Samariang (N07)	Kampong Tunku	194/07/06	Dewan Masyarakat Sg. Lumut; SK Rancangan Perumahan Rakyat PPR
Samariang (N07)	Bedil	194/07/07	Dewan Masyarakat Baru Kpg. Lintang
Samariang (N07)	Astana Lot	194/07/08	Dewan SK Encik Buyong
Satok (N08)	Segedup	194/08/01	Tabika Kemas Kpg. Sg. Maong; Dewan Serbaguna Kpg. Segedup
Satok (N08)	Patingan	194/08/02	Dewan Datuk Merpati Jepang
Satok (N08)	Satok	194/08/03	SK Rakyat Jln. Haji Bolhasaan
Satok (N08)	Masjid	194/08/04	SMJK Chung Hua No.4 Jln. Haji Taha
Satok (N08)	Maderasah	194/08/05	Ibu Pejabat Bulan Sabit Merah
Satok (N08)	Reservoir	194/08/06	SK St. Joseph Jln. Were
Satok (N08)	Nanas	194/08/07	SJK (C) Chung Hua No. 4
Satok (N08)	Patinggi Ali	194/08/08	SK Merpati Jepang

=== Representation history ===
Members of Parliament for Petra Jaya
Parliament	No	Years	Member	Party	Vote Share
Constituency created from Santubong and Bandar Kuching
8th	P156	1990-1995	Sulaiman Daud (سليمان بن داود)	BN (PBB)	12,686; 80.46%
9th	P168	1995-1999	Sulaiman Daud (سليمان بن داود)	BN (PBB)	Uncontested
10th	P168	1999-2004	Sulaiman Daud (سليمان بن داود)	BN (PBB)	11,878; 56.87%
11th	P194	2004-2008	Fadillah Yusof (فضيلة يوسف)	BN (PBB)	18,236; 77.09%
12th	P194	2008-2013	Fadillah Yusof (فضيلة يوسف)	BN (PBB)	19,515; 79.22%
13th	P194	2013-2018	Fadillah Yusof (فضيلة يوسف)	BN (PBB)	29,559; 78.46%
14th	P194	2018	Fadillah Yusof (فضيلة يوسف)	BN (PBB)	28,306; 65.91%
14th	P194	2018–2022	Fadillah Yusof (فضيلة يوسف)	GPS (PBB)	28,306; 65.91%
15th	P194	2022–present	Fadillah Yusof (فضيلة يوسف)	GPS (PBB)	54,745; 79.15%

=== State constituency ===
Parliamentary constituency	State constituency					
Parliamentary constituency	1969–1978	1978–1990	1990–1999	1999–2008	2008–2016	2016−present
Petra Jaya				Samariang		
Petra Jaya			Satok			
Petra Jaya			Tupong			

=== Historical boundaries ===
State Constituency	Area			
State Constituency	1987	1996	2005	2015
Samariang		Kampung Tunku; Kampung Samariang; Petra Jaya; Taman Farhanas; Taman Melati	Kampung Boyan; Kampung Lintang; Kampung Tunku; Petra Jaya; Samariang	Kampung Samariang; Kampung Siol Kandis; Petra Jaya; Samariang; Taman Sukma
Satok	Kampung Masjid; Kampung Patingga; Satok; Taman Budaya; Taman How Hua	Kampung Lintang; Kampung Masjid; Satok; Taman Fitrah; Taman Hussein	Kampung Bandarshah; Kampung Masjid; Kampung Patingan; Satok; Segedup	Kampung Bandarshah; Kampung Kudei; Kampung Patingan; Satok; Segedup
Tupong	Kampung Kudei; Petra Jaya; Segedup; Taman Sri Depo; Tupong	Kampung Paroh; Matang; Taman Serapi; Taman Sri Depo; Tupong	Kampung Kudei; Kampung Peroh; Matang; Sungai Tengah; Taman Serapi	Kampung Peroh; Matang; Sungai Tengah; Taman Serapi; Tupong

=== Current state assembly members ===
No.	State Constituency	Member	Coalition (Party)
N06	Tupong	Fazzrudin Abdul Rahman	GPS (PBB)
N07	Samariang	Sharifah Hasidah Sayeed Aman Ghazali	GPS (PBB)
N08	Satok	Ibrahim Baki	GPS (PBB)

=== Local governments & postcodes ===
No.	State Constituency	Local Government	Postcode
N06	Tupong	Kuching North City Hall; Padawan Municipal Council (Kampung Sagah area)	93000, 93050, 93150, 93300, 93400, 93502, 93503, 93506, 93520 Kuching
N07	Samariang	Kuching North City Hall	93000, 93050, 93150, 93300, 93400, 93502, 93503, 93506, 93520 Kuching
N08	Satok	Kuching North City Council; Padawan Municipal Council (Segedup area)	93000, 93050, 93150, 93300, 93400, 93502, 93503, 93506, 93520 Kuching

== Election results ==
Malaysian general election, 2022
Party	Candidate	Votes	%	∆%
GPS	Fadillah Yusof	54,745	79.15	▲79.15
PH	Sopian Julaihi	13,382	19.35	▲19.35
Parti Sedar Rakyat Sarawak	Othman Abdillah	1,036	1.50	▲1.50
Total valid votes		69,163	100.00	
Total rejected ballots		551		
Unreturned ballots		360		
Turnout		70,074	62.98	▼12.14
Registered electors		109,809		
Majority		41,363	59.80	▲24.83
GPS gain from BN		Swing		?
Source(s) https://lom.agc.gov.my/ilims/upload/portal/akta/outputp/1753265/PARLIMEN%20SARAWAK%20(PUB%20620).pdf

Malaysian general election, 2018
Party	Candidate	Votes	%	∆%
BN	Fadillah Yusof	28,306	65.91	▼12.55
PKR	Nor Irwan Ahmat Nor	13,289	30.94	▲9.40
PAS	Hamdan Sani	1,350	3.14	▲3.14
Total valid votes		42,945	100.00	
Total rejected ballots		354		
Unreturned ballots		214		
Turnout		43,513	75.12	▼1.60
Registered electors		57,925		
Majority		15,017	34.97	▼21.95
BN hold		Swing		
Source(s) "His Majesty's Government Gazette - Notice of Contested Election, Parliament for the State of Sarawak [P.U. (B) 247/2018]" (PDF). Attorney General's Chambers of Malaysia. 3 May 2018. "Federal Government Gazette - Results of Contested Election and Statements of the Poll after the Official Addition of Votes, Parliamentary Constituencies for the State of Sarawak [P.U. (B) 321/2018]" (PDF). Attorney General's Chambers of Malaysia. 28 May 2018. Archived from the original (PDF) on 29 December 2019.

Malaysian general election, 2013
Party	Candidate	Votes	%	∆%
BN	Fadillah Yusof	29,559	78.46	▼0.76
PKR	Ahmad Nazib Johari	8,116	21.54	▲0.76
Total valid votes		37,675	100.00	
Total rejected ballots		321		
Unreturned ballots		174		
Turnout		38,170	76.72	▲14.98
Registered electors		49,750		
Majority		21,443	56.92	▼1.52
BN hold		Swing		
Source(s) "Federal Government Gazette - Notice of Contested Election, Parliament for the State of Sarawak [P.U. (B) 184/2013]" (PDF). Attorney General's Chambers of Malaysia. 26 April 2013. Archived from the original (PDF) on 30 September 2018. "Federal Government Gazette - Results of Contested Election and Statements of the Poll after the Official Addition of Votes, Parliamentary Constituencies for the State of Sarawak [P.U. (B) 225/2013]" (PDF). Attorney General's Chambers of Malaysia. 22 May 2013. Archived from the original (PDF) on 30 September 2018.

Malaysian general election, 2008
Party	Candidate	Votes	%	∆%
BN	Fadillah Yusof	19,515	79.22	▲2.13
PKR	Mohamad Jolhi	5,118	20.78	▼2.13
Total valid votes		24,633	100.00	
Total rejected ballots		263		
Unreturned ballots		131		
Turnout		25,027	61.74	▲0.28
Registered electors		40,533		
Majority		14,397	58.44	▲4.26
BN hold		Swing		

Malaysian general election, 2004
Party	Candidate	Votes	%	∆%
BN	Fadillah Yusof	18,236	77.09	▲20.22
PKR	Wan Zainal Abidin Wan Senusi	5,420	22.91	▼20.22
Total valid votes		23,656	100.00	
Total rejected ballots		292		
Unreturned ballots		247		
Turnout		24,195	61.46	▼0.14
Registered electors		39,367		
Majority		12,816	54.18	▲40.44
BN hold		Swing		

Malaysian general election, 1999
Party	Candidate	Votes	%	∆%
BN	Sulaiman Daud	11,878	56.87	▲56.87
PKR	Wan Zainal Abidin Wan Senusi	9,008	43.13	▲43.13
Total valid votes		20,886	100.00	
Total rejected ballots		312		
Unreturned ballots		474		
Turnout		21,672	61.60	
Registered electors		35,181		
Majority		2,870	13.74	
BN hold		Swing		

Malaysian general election, 1995
Party	Candidate	Votes	%	∆%
On the nomination day, Sulaiman Daud won uncontested.
BN	Sulaiman Daud			
Total valid votes			100.00	
Total rejected ballots				
Unreturned ballots				
Turnout				
Registered electors		31,545		
Majority				
BN hold		Swing		
Source(s) https://github.com/TindakMalaysia/HISTORICAL-ELECTION-RESULTS/blob/main/1995-ELECTION-RESULTS/MALAYSIA_1995_PARLIAMENT_RESULTS.csv

Malaysian general election, 1990
Party	Candidate	Votes	%
BN	Sulaiman Daud	12,686	80.46
PERMAS	Mustapha Ismail	3,080	19.54
Total valid votes		15,766	100.00
Total rejected ballots		287	
Unreturned ballots		0	
Turnout		16,053	62.41
Registered electors		25,722	
Majority		9,606	60.92
This was a new constituency created.
