= Select Committee on Lynas Advanced Materials Plant =

Committee appointed by the Malaysian House of Representatives

The Select Committee On Lynas Advanced Materials Plant (LAMP) was a select committee of the Malaysian House of Representatives, which studied issues raised by the public regarding safety standards of the Lynas Advanced Materials Plant (LAMP) in Kuantan, Pahang. The committee sat for a three-month period between 20 March and 20 June 2012.

== Report ==
Following the end of the select committee's three-month timeframe, reports have been made available on the Parliament of Malaysia website: .

== Membership ==
=== 12th Parliament ===
As of December 2018, the Committee's current members are as follows:

Member	Party	Constituency
Mohamed Khaled Nordin MP (Chairman)	UMNO	Pasir Gudang
Abdul Rahman Dahlan MP	UMNO	Kota Belud
Boon Soon Teng MP	MCA	Tebrau
Nancy Shukri MP	PBB	Batang Sadong
Teck Meng Liang MP	Gerakan	Simpang Renggam
Zulkifli Noordin MP	IND	Kulim-Bandar Baharu

== Chair of the Select Committee On Lynas Advanced Materials Plant (LAMP) ==
Chair	Party	Constituency	First elected	Method
Mohamed Khaled Nordin	UMNO	Pasir Gudang	20 March 2012	Elected by the Speaker of the House of Representatives

== See also ==
- Parliamentary Committees of Malaysia
