= Human Rights and Constitutional Affairs Select Committee =

Committee appointed by the Malaysian House of Representatives

The Human Rights and Constitutional Affairs Select Committee (Malay: Jawatankuasa Pilihan Khas Hak Asasi Manusia dan Hal Ehwal Perlembagaan) is a select committee of the Malaysian House of Representatives. It is among four new bipartisan parliamentary select committees announced by the Minister in the Prime Minister's Department in charge of legal affairs, Liew Vui Keong, on 17 October 2019 in an effort to improve the institutional system. The creation saw the portfolio of human rights being moved from the previous Rights and Gender Equality Select Committee, now known as the Gender Equality and Family Development Select Committee.

== Membership ==
=== 14th Parliament ===
As of December 2019, the Committee's current members are as follows:

Member	Party	Constituency
Charles Anthony Santiago MP (Chairman)	DAP	Klang
Abdullah Sani Abdul Hamid MP	PKR	Kapar
Noh Omar MP	UMNO	Tanjong Karang
Sanisvara Nethaji Rayer Rajaji MP	DAP	Jelutong
Mas Ermieyati Samsudin MP	BERSATU	Masjid Tanah
Nancy Shukri MP	PBB	Badang Sadong
Kesavan Subramaniam MP	PKR	Sungai Siput

== Chair of the Human Rights and Constitutional Affairs Select Committee ==
Chair	Party	Constituency	First elected	Method
Charles Anthony Santiago MP	DAP	Klang	4 December 2019	Elected by the Speaker of the House of Representatives

== See also ==
- Parliamentary Committees of Malaysia
