= Idrus Harun =

9th Attorney General of Malaysia

Yang Berbahagia Tan Sri Dato' Sri Idrus Harun PMN PSM PJN SSAP SIMP SPMT DPMT DSDK
- إدروس هارون
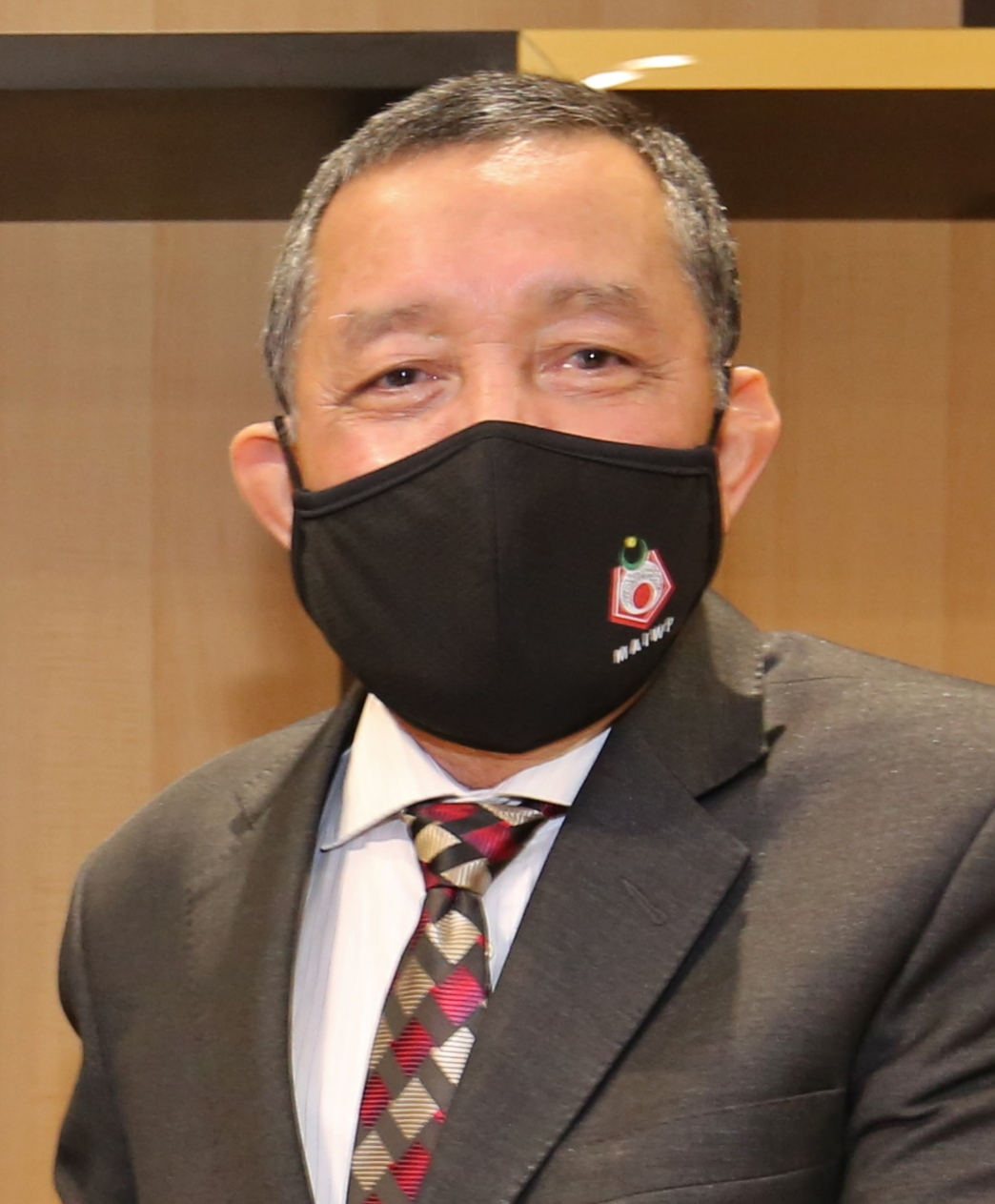
- Idrus in 2021

11th Attorney General of Malaysia
- In office 6 March 2020 – 6 September 2023
- Monarch: Abdullah
- Prime Minister: Muhyiddin Yassin (2020–2021); Ismail Sabri Yaakob (2021–2022); Anwar Ibrahim (2022–2023)
- Preceded by: Tommy Thomas
- Succeeded by: Ahmad Terrirudin Mohd Salleh

Personal details
- Born: Idrus bin Azizan Harun; 2 February 1955 (age 71) Kampung Sanglang, Ayer Hitam, Kubang Pasu, Kedah, Malaysia
- Citizenship: Malaysian
- Spouse: Zaiton Noor M. Hashim
- Relations: Azhar Harun (brother)
- Education: University of Malaya (LLB)
- Occupation: Lawyer

Idrus bin Azizan Harun (Jawi: إدروس بن عزيزان هارون; born 2 February 1955) is a Malaysian lawyer and the former Attorney General of Malaysia from 2020 to 2023.

== Early life and education ==
Idrus was born in Kampung Sanglang, Kedah in 1955. He attended to Ayer Hitam Secondary School and Kolej Sultan Abdul Hamid. He obtained a bachelor's degree in law in honours from University of Malaya in 1980.

== Career ==
Following his graduation from University of Malaya in 1980, Idrus started his career as a lawyer. He served as the senior registrar of the Kuala Lumpur High Court, Judge of the Sessions Court in Kota Kinabalu, deputy public prosecutor in Attorney General Chambers, legal advisor to the Terengganu state government, Kerajaan Negeri Terengganu, Senior Federal Counsel in Malaysian Anti-Corruption Commission (BPR) and legal advisor to the Election Commission.

In 2014, Idrus was appointed a judge of the Court of Appeal and served till he was newly appointed a judge of the Federal Court on 28 November 2018. On 6 March 2020, he was appointed Attorney General, with 2-year term until 2022. His appointment was in order to fill the vacancy due to the resignation of Tommy Thomas. On 3 March 2023, his term as the Attorney-General was extended for six more months and set to expire on 6 September 2023.

== Personal life ==
Idrus is from a family with nine children of Kedah, exactly in Kampung Sanglang, Ayer Hitam. His father was the village head whereas his mother was a housewife. Idrus is also the elder brother of the 10th Speaker of the Dewan Rakyat, Azhar Azizan Harun.

== Honours ==
=== Honours of Malaysia ===
- Malaysia :
  - Commander of the Order of Meritorious Service (PJN) – Datuk (2007)
  - Commander of the Order of Loyalty to the Crown of Malaysia (PSM) – Tan Sri (2014)
  - Commander of the Order of the Defender of the Realm (PMN) – Tan Sri (2020)
- Pahang :
  - Grand Knight of the Order of the Crown of Pahang (SIMP) – Dato' Indera (2008)
  - Grand Knight of the Order of Sultan Ahmad Shah of Pahang (SSAP) – Dato' Sri (2013)
- Terengganu :
  - Knight Commander of the Order of the Crown of Terengganu (DPMT) – Dato' (1997)
  - Knight Grand Commander of the Order of the Crown of Terengganu (SPMT) – Dato' (2014)
- Kedah :
  - Knight Companion of the Order of Loyalty to the Royal House of Kedah (DSDK) – Dato' (2007)
