= Committee of Selection (Malaysian Senate) =

Malaysia Selection Committee

The Committee of Selection (Malay: Jawantankuasa Pemilih; simplified Chinese: 马来西亚上议院选择委员会; traditional Chinese: 馬來西亞上議院選擇委員會; Tamil: மலேசிய மன்றத்தின் லார்ட்ஸ் தேர்வு குழு) is a select committee of the Senate in the Parliament of Malaysia. The committee carries out responsibilities stipulated by the Standing Orders. Members are elected at the beginning of each session.

== Membership ==
=== 14th Parliament ===
As of January 2019, the committee's membership was as follows:

Member	Party
Vigneswaran Sanasee (Chair)	MIC
Abdul Halim Abdul Samad	UMNO
Muhamad Mustafa	PAS
Hock Cheh Nga	DAP
Vacant	

=== 13th Parliament ===
Member	Party	Date of appointment
Abu Zahar Ujang (Chair)	UMNO	1 August 2013; 26 June 2014; 13 April 2015
Syed Husin Ali	PKR	1 August 2013; 26 June 2014
Doris Sophia Brodi	PRS	1 August 2013; 26 June 2014; 13 April 2015
Jaspal Singh Gurbakhes Singh	MIC	1 August 2013; 26 June 2014; 13 April 2015
Kok Chung Hou	MCA	26 June 2014; 13 April 2015
Tsu Koon Koh	Gerakan	1 August 2013
Johari Mat	PAS	13 April 2015

=== 12th Parliament ===
Member	Party	Date of appointment
Abdul Hamid Pawanteh (Chair)	UMNO	29 May 2008; 7 April 2009
Abu Zahar Ujang (Chair)	UMNO	6 May 2010
Empiang Jabu	PBB	29 May 2008; 7 April 2009
Kamaruddin Ambok	UMNO	29 May 2008; 7 April 2009
Tsu Koon Koh	Gerakan	6 May 2010
Maijol Mahap	UPKO	6 May 2010
Mumtaz Md Nawi	PAS	7 April 2009; 6 May 2010
Palanivel Govindasamy	MIC	6 May 2010
Vijayaratnam Seevaratnam	Gerakan	29 May 2008
Foon Meng Wong	MCA	29 May 2008; 7 April 2009

=== 11th Parliament ===
Member	Party	Date of appointment
Abdul Hamid Pawanteh (Chair)	UMNO	7 June 2004; 4 May 2005; 23 May 2006; 21 May 2007
Abdul Raman Suliman	UMNO	21 May 2007
Benedict Bujang Tembak	PBB	7 June 2004; 4 May 2005
Empiang Jabu	PBB	23 May 2006; 21 May 2007
Hamzah Zainudin	UMNO	4 May 2005; 23 May 2006
Karim Ghani	UMNO	7 June 2004
Vijayaratnam Seevaratnam	Gerakan	7 June 2004; 4 May 2005; 23 May 2006; 21 May 2007
Foon Meng Wong	MCA	7 June 2004; 4 May 2005; 23 May 2006; 21 May 2007

=== 10th Parliament ===
Member	Party	Date of appointment
Charlie Lap Chang Chau	MCA	8 May 2001
Christina Lorline Tibok	UPKO	17 April 2000
Gapar Gurrohu	UMNO	8 May 2001; 8 April 2002; 14 April 2003
Ghazi @ Hasbullah Ramli	UMNO	17 April 2000
Hamzah Zainudin	UMNO	14 April 2003
Lim Teck Ho	MCA	8 April 2002
Jaya Partiban	MIC	17 April 2000; 8 May 2001; 14 April 2003
Michael Wing Sum Chen	MCA	8 May 2001; 8 April 2002
Ratnam Muthiah	MIC	8 April 2002
Thiong Hock Tee	MCA	17 April 2000
Teong Look Yew	MCA	14 April 2003

=== 9th Parliament ===
Member	Party	Date of appointment
Abdul Aziz Abdul Rahman	UMNO	18 May 1999
Kah Kiat Chong	LDP	10 December 1996; 12 May 1997; 12 May 1998
Ding Seling	PBB	3 July 1995; 10 December 1996
K. Vijayanathan Kesava Pillai	MIC	3 July 1995
Kamilia Ibrahim	UMNO	18 May 1999
Keok Hai Khoo	MCA	12 May 1997; 12 May 1998
Kai Meng Low	MCA	10 December 1996
Yen Yen Ng	MCA	3 July 1995
Rahim Baba	UMNO	3 July 1995; 10 December 1996
T. Marimuthu	MIC	12 May 1997; 12 May 1998
V. K. K. Teagarajan	MIC	18 May 1999
William Kung Hui Lau	SNAP	18 May 1999
Zuki Kamaluddin	UMNO	12 May 1997; 12 May 1998

=== 8th Parliament ===
Member	Party	Date of appointment
Adam Kadir	UMNO	25 May 1992; 24 May 1993
David Eng Hock Yeoh	MCA	9 May 1994
Ding Seling	PBB	25 May 1992; 24 May 1993; 9 May 1994
K. Vijayanathan Kesava Pillai	MIC	9 May 1994
Mustapa Mohamed	UMNO	9 May 1994
V. K. Sellappan	MIC	25 May 1992; 24 May 1993
Vadiveloo Govindasamy (Chair)	MIC	25 May 1992
William Lin Kwai Chek	MCA	25 May 1992; 24 May 1993

=== 7th Parliament ===
Member	Party	Date of appointment
Hussein Ahmad	UMNO	1 December 1986; 28 March 1988; 27 March 1989; 19 March 1990
Hon Kam Mak	MCA	1 December 1986; 28 March 1988; 27 March 1989
Mazidah Zakaria	UMNO	1 December 1986; 28 March 1988; 27 March 1989; 19 March 1990
Rajoo Desari @ Govindasamy	MIC	1 December 1986; 28 March 1988
Peng Khoon Tan	MCA	19 March 1990
Valli Muthusamy	MIC	27 March 1989; 19 March 1990

=== 6th Parliament ===
Member	Party	Date of appointment
Abdul Razak Abu Samah	UMNO	9 April 1984
Abdul Razak Hussein	UMNO	19 July 1982
Abdullah Fadzil Che Wan	UMNO	15 April 1985
G. Pasamanickam	MIC	19 July 1982; 9 April 1984; 15 April 1985
Woon Wah Kam	MCA	19 July 1982
Fook Yen Loh	MCA	9 April 1984
Mohamed Nasir	BERJASA	19 July 1982
Mohamed Yahya	UMNO	9 April 1984
Mohamed Yusof Mohamed Noor	UMNO	15 April 1985
Chang Soong Tan	MCA	15 April 1985

=== 5th Parliament ===
Member	Party	Date of appointment
Abdul Razak Hussein	UMNO	15 December 1980; 13 April 1981; 22 March 1982
Woon Wah Kam	MCA	23 October 1978; 7 April 1980; 13 April 1981; 22 March 1982
Kamarul Ariffin Mohd Yassin	UMNO	23 October 1978; 7 April 1980
M. Mahalingam	UMNO	23 October 1978; 7 April 1980; 15 December 1980; 13 April 1981; 22 March 1982
Mohamed Nasir	BERJASA	23 October 1978; 7 April 1980; 13 April 1981; 22 March 1982

=== 4th Parliament ===
Member	Party	Date of appointment
Abdul Razak Hussein	UMNO	6 January 1975
Athi Nahappan	MIC	6 January 1975; 26 April 1976
Kwong Hon Chan	MCA	26 April 1976
Woon Wah Kam	MCA	6 January 1975; 17 April 1978
Kamarul Ariffin Mohd Yassin	UMNO	18 April 1977; 17 April 1978
M. Mahalingam	UMNO	17 April 1978
Nik Hassan Nik Yahya	UMNO	26 April 1976
Othman Abdullah	UMNO	18 April 1977; 17 April 1978
Rafidah Aziz	UMNO	26 April 1976
T. S. Gabriel	MIC	6 January 1975
Khoon Hock Wee	MCA	18 April 1977
V. Ponnusamy Pillai	MIC	18 April 1977

=== 3rd Parliament ===
Member	Party	Date of appointment
Abdul Kadir Yusuf	UMNO	2 May 1973; 13 May 1974
Amaluddin Darus	PAS	2 May 1973; 13 May 1974
Kwong Hon Chan	MCA	10 May 1972
Yoon Thim Lee	MCA	22 March 1971
Mohamed Noor Tahir	UMNO	10 May 1972
Nik Hassan Nik Yahya	UMNO	22 March 1971; 10 May 1972
Syed Hassan Aidid	UMNO	22 March 1971; 10 May 1972; 2 May 1973; 13 May 1974
Tong Hye Tan	MCA	22 March 1971
Seng Chow Wong	MCA	2 May 1973; 13 May 1974

=== 2nd Parliament ===
Member	Party	Date of appointment
Abdul Rahman Mohamed Yasin (Chair)	UMNO	20 May 1964; 26 May 1965; 15 June 1966; 15 June 1967; 7 June 1968
Yoon Thim Lee	MCA	20 May 1964; 26 May 1965; 15 June 1966; 15 June 1967; 7 June 1968
Nik Hassan Nik Yahya	UMNO	20 May 1964; 26 May 1965; 15 June 1966; 15 June 1967; 7 June 1968
Sheikh Abu Bakar Yahya	UMNO	20 May 1964; 26 May 1965; 15 June 1966; 15 June 1967; 7 June 1968
Tong Hye Tan	MCA	20 May 1964; 26 May 1965; 15 June 1966; 15 June 1967; 7 June 1968

=== 1st Parliament ===
Member	Party	Date of appointment
Abdul Rahman Mohamed Yasin (Chair)	UMNO	11 December 1959; 2 May 1960; 2 May 1961; 7 May 1962; 3 June 1963
Ahmad Said (Chair)	UMNO	11 December 1959
Kai Boh Khaw	MCA	3 June 1963
Yew Koh Leong	MCA	11 December 1959; 2 May 1960; 2 May 1961; 7 May 1962
Nik Hassan Nik Yahya	UMNO	11 December 1959; 2 May 1960; 2 May 1961; 7 May 1962; 3 June 1963
Raja Rastam Shahrome Raja Said Tauphy	UMNO	2 May 1960; 2 May 1961; 7 May 1962; 3 June 1963
Tong Hye Tan	MCA	11 December 1959; 2 May 1960; 2 May 1961; 7 May 1962; 3 June 1963

== See also ==
- Parliamentary Committees of Malaysia
