= Committee of Selection (Malaysian House of Representatives) =

The Committee of Selection (Malay: Jawantankuasa Pemilih; simplified Chinese: 马来西亚下议院选择委员会; traditional Chinese: 馬來西亞下議院選擇委員會; Tamil: மலேசிய பொதுமக்கள் தேர்வுக் குழு) is a select committee of the House of Representatives in the Parliament of Malaysia. The committee is best known for appointing members of committees established under resolutions of the House and the Standing Orders for Public Business. Members are elected at the beginning of each session.

== Membership ==
=== 15th Parliament ===
Member	Party	Constituency	Date of appointment
Johari Abdul, chairman	PH (PKR)	–	14 February 2023
Fadillah Yusof	GPS (PBB)	Petra Jaya	14 February 2023
Anthony Loke Siew Fook	PH (DAP)	Seremban	14 February 2023
Rafizi Ramli	PH (PKR)	Pandan	14 February 2023
Azalina Othman Said	BN (UMNO)	Pengerang	14 February 2023
Hamzah Zainudin	PN (BERSATU)	Larut	14 February 2023
Takiyuddin Hassan	PN (PAS)	Kota Bharu	14 February 2023

=== 14th Parliament ===
As of May 2018, the committee's membership was as follows:

Member	Party	Constituency
Mohamad Ariff Md Yusof MP (Chair)	AMANAH	-
Ahmad Zahid Hamidi MP	UMNO	Bagan Datuk
Ignatius Darell Leiking MP	WARISAN	Penampang
Mohamad Sabu MP	AMANAH	Kota Raja
Kok Wai Tan MP	DAP	Cheras
Wan Azizah Wan Ismail MP	PKR	Pandan
Muhyiddin Yassin MP	BERSATU	Pagoh

=== 13th Parliament ===
Member	Party	Constituency	Date of appointment
Pandikar Amin Mulia (Chair)	UMNO	-	18 July 2013
Joseph Entulu Belaun MP	PRS	Selangau	18 July 2013
Palanivel Govindasamy MP	MIC	Cameron Highlands	18 July 2013
Ahmad Zahid Hamidi MP	UMNO	Bagan Datuk	19 October 2015
Anwar Ibrahim MP	PKR	Permatang Pauh	18 July 2013
Kit Siang Lim MP	DAP	Gelang Patah	18 July 2013
Tiong Lai Liow MP	MCA	Bentong	18 July 2013
Subramaniam Sathasivam MP	MIC	Segamat	19 October 2015
Wan Azizah Wan Ismail MP	PKR	Permatang Pauh	19 October 2015
Muhyiddin Yassin MP	UMNO	Pagoh	18 July 2013

=== 12th Parliament ===
Member	Party	Constituency	Date of appointment
Pandikar Amin Mulia (Chair)	UMNO	-	26 May 2008
Najib Razak MP	UMNO	Pekan	26 May 2008
Anwar Ibrahim MP	PKR	Permatang Pauh	18 December 2008
Bernard Giluk Dompok MP	UPKO	Penampang	26 May 2008
Kit Siang Lim MP	DAP	Ipoh Timor	26 May 2008
Ka Ting Ong MP	MCA	Kulai	26 May 2008
Subramaniam Sathasivam MP	MIC	Segamat	26 May 2008
Wan Azizah Wan Ismail MP	PKR	Permatang Pauh	26 May 2008
Muhyiddin Yassin MP	UMNO	Pagoh	15 December 2009

=== 11th Parliament ===
Member	Party	Constituency	Date of appointment
Ramli Ngah Talib MP (Chair)	UMNO	Pasir Salak	
Mohamed Zahir Ismail (Chair)	UMNO	-	24 May 2004
Najib Razak MP	UMNO	Pekan	24 May 2004
Bernard Giluk Dompok MP	UPKO	Ranau	24 May 2004
Kit Siang Lim MP	DAP	Ipoh Timor	24 May 2004
Ka Ting Ong MP	MCA	Tanjong Piai	24 May 2004
Samy Vellu Sangalimuthu MP	MIC	Sungai Siput	24 May 2004
Leo Michael Toyad MP	PBB	Mukah	24 May 2004

=== 10th Parliament ===
Member	Party	Constituency	Date of appointment
Mohamed Zahir Ismail (Chair)	UMNO	-	15 February 2000
Abdullah Ahmad Badawi MP	UMNO	Kepala Batas	15 February 2000
Leo Moggie Irok MP	PBDS	Kanowit	15 February 2000
Liong Sik Ling MP	MCA	Labis	15 February 2000
Fadzil Noor MP	PAS	Pendang	15 February 2000
Samy Vellu Sangalimuthu MP	MIC	Sungai Siput	15 February 2000
Osu Sukam MP	UMNO	Papar	15 February 2000

=== 9th Parliament ===
Member	Party	Constituency	Date of appointment
Mohamed Zahir Ismail (Chair)	UMNO	-	12 June 1995
Anwar Ibrahim MP	UMNO	Permatang Pauh	12 June 1995
Leo Moggie Irok MP	PBDS	Kanowit	12 June 1995
Kit Siang Lim MP	DAP	Tanjong	12 June 1995
Liong Sik Ling MP	MCA	Labis	12 June 1995
Samy Vellu Sangalimuthu MP	MIC	Sungai Siput	12 June 1995
Osu Sukam MP	UMNO	Papar	12 June 1995

=== 8th Parliament ===
Member	Party	Constituency	Date of appointment
Mohamed Zahir Ismail (Chair)	UMNO	-	5 December 1990
Abdul Ghafar Baba MP	UMNO	Jasin	5 December 1990
Sakaran Dandai MP	UMNO	Semporna	5 December 1990
Leo Moggie Irok MP	PBDS	Kanowit	5 December 1990
Kit Siang Lim MP	DAP	Tanjong	5 December 1990
Liong Sik Ling MP	MCA	Labis	5 December 1990
Samy Vellu Sangalimuthu MP	MIC	Sungai Siput	5 December 1990

=== 7th Parliament ===
Member	Party	Constituency	Date of appointment
Mohamed Zahir Ismail (Chair)	UMNO	-	8 October 1986
Abdul Ghafar Baba MP	UMNO	Jasin	8 October 1986
Kasitah Gaddam MP	USNO	Kinabalu	8 October 1986
Leo Moggie Irok MP	PBDS	Kanowit	8 October 1986
Kit Siang Lim MP	DAP	Tanjong	8 October 1986
Liong Sik Ling MP	MCA	Labis	8 October 1986
Samy Vellu Sangalimuthu MP	MIC	Sungai Siput	8 October 1986

=== 6th Parliament ===
Member	Party	Constituency	Date of appointment
Mohamed Zahir Ismail (Chair)	UMNO	-	12 October 1982
Musa Hitam MP	UMNO	Panti	12 October 1982
Leo Moggie Irok MP	SNAP	Kanowit	12 October 1982
San Choon Lee MP	MCA	Seremban	12 October 1982
Kit Siang Lim MP	DAP	Kota Melaka	12 October 1982
Pengiran Othman Pengiran Rauf MP	BERJAYA	Kimanis	12 October 1982
Samy Vellu Sangalimuthu MP	MIC	Sungai Siput	12 October 1982

=== 5th Parliament ===
Member	Party	Constituency	Date of appointment
Syed Nasir Ismail (Chair)	UMNO	-	11 October 1978
Musa Hitam MP	UMNO	Labis	3 November 1981
Leo Moggie Irok MP	SNAP	Kanowit	11 October 1978
San Choon Lee MP	MCA	Segamat	11 October 1978
Kit Siang Lim MP	DAP	Petaling	11 October 1978
Mahathir Mohamad MP	UMNO	Kubang Pasu	11 October 1978
Kee Hui Ong MP	SUPP	Bandar Kuching	11 October 1978
V. Manickavasagam Pillai MP	MIC	Pelabuhan Kelang	11 October 1978
Samy Vellu Sangalimuthu MP	MIC	Sungai Siput	3 November 1981

=== 4th Parliament ===
Member	Party	Constituency	Date of appointment
Nik Ahmad Kamil Nik Mahmood (Chair)	UMNO	-	6 November 1974
Edmund Langgu Saga MP	SNAP	Saratok	6 November 1974
San Choon Lee MP	MCA	Segamat	6 November 1974
Mohamad Asri Muda MP	PAS	Nilam Puri	6 November 1974
Hussein Onn MP	UMNO	Sri Gading	6 November 1974
V. Manickavasagam Pillai MP	MIC	Pelabuhan Kelang	6 November 1974
Mohamed Yaacob MP	UMNO	Tanah Merah	6 November 1974

=== 3rd Parliament ===
Member	Party	Constituency	Date of appointment
Chik Mohamed Yusuf Sheikh Abdul Rahman (Chair)	UMNO	-	9 March 1971
Ismail Abdul Rahman MP	UMNO	Johore Timor	9 March 1971
Man Hin Chen MP	DAP	Seremban Timor	9 March 1971
Mohamed Ghazali Jawi MP	UMNO	Kuala Kangsar	9 March 1971
Mohamad Asri Muda MP	PMIP	Kota Bharu Hulu	9 March 1971
V. Manickavasagam Pillai MP	MIC	Klang	9 March 1971
Siew Sin Tan MP	MCA	Malacca Tengah	9 March 1971

=== 2nd Parliament ===
Member	Party	Constituency	Date of appointment
Chik Mohamed Yusuf Sheikh Abdul Rahman (Chair)	UMNO	-	20 May 1964; 26 May 1965; 15 June 1966; 15 June 1967; 6 June 1968
Abdul Razak Hussein MP	UMNO	Pekan	20 May 1964; 26 May 1965; 15 June 1966; 15 June 1967; 6 June 1968
Chin Shin Chia MP		Sarawak	15 June 1966; 15 June 1967; 6 June 1968
Ismail Abdul Rahman MP	UMNO	Johore Timor	20 May 1964; 26 May 1965; 15 June 1966
Khir Johari MP	UMNO	Kedah Tengah	15 June 1967; 6 June 1968
Mohamad Asri Muda MP	PMIP	Pasir Puteh	20 May 1964; 26 May 1965; 15 June 1966; 15 June 1967; 6 June 1968
Sinnathamby Rajaratnam MP	PAP	Singapore	20 May 1964; 26 May 1965
Siew Sin Tan MP	MCA	Malacca Tengah	20 May 1964; 26 May 1965; 15 June 1966; 15 June 1967; 6 June 1968
V. Manickavasagam Pillai MP	MIC	Klang	20 May 1964; 26 May 1965; 15 June 1966; 15 June 1967; 6 June 1968

=== 1st Parliament ===
Member	Party	Constituency	Date of appointment
Mohamad Noah Omar MP (Chair)	UMNO	Johore Bahru Timor	12 September 1959; 20 April 1960; 20 April 1961; 26 April 1962; 23 May 1963
Abdul Razak Hussein MP	UMNO	Pekan	12 September 1959; 20 April 1960; 20 April 1961; 26 April 1962; 23 May 1963
Ahmad Boestamam MP	Ra'ayat	Setapak	12 September 1959; 20 April 1960; 26 April 1962
Burhanuddin al-Helmy MP	PMIP	Pasir Puteh	12 September 1959; 20 April 1960; 20 April 1961; 26 April 1962; 23 May 1963
Ismail Abdul Rahman MP	UMNO	Johore Timor	26 April 1962; 23 May 1963
Karam Singh Veriah MP	Ra'ayat	Damansara	20 April 1961
Kean Siew Lim MP	Labour	Dato' Kramat	23 May 1963
Yoke Lin Ong MP	MCA	Ulu Selangor	12 September 1959; 20 April 1960; 20 April 1961; 26 April 1962; 23 May 1963
Sulaiman Abdul Rahman MP	UMNO	Muar Selatan	12 September 1959; 20 April 1960; 20 April 1961
V. Manickavasagam Pillai MP	MIC	Klang	12 September 1959; 20 April 1960; 20 April 1961; 26 April 1962; 23 May 1963

== See also ==
- Parliamentary Committees of Malaysia
