= Selection Committee (Australia) =

Standing committee of the Australian House of Representatives

- 47th Parliament of Australia

Type
- Type: Standing Committee of the Australian House of Representatives

Leadership
- Speaker (Chair): Milton Dick, Labor since 26 July 2022

Structure
- Seats: 14
- Political groups: Government (8): Labor (8); Opposition (4): Liberal (2); Liberal National (1); Nationals (1); Crossbench (2): Centre Alliance (1); Greens (1)

Meeting place
- Parliament House; Canberra, Australian Capital Territory; Australia

Website
- Selection Committee

Rules
- Standing Orders of the House of Representatives

The Selection Committee is a committee of the Australian House of Representatives responsible for determining the program of private members business in the House of Representatives. The committee is governed by Standing Order 222 and consists of fourteen members, eight government members and six non-government members. The Speaker is chair of the committee ex officio. The Deputy Speaker can substitute for the Speaker in his absence.

== Membership ==
=== 47th Parliament ===
In the 47th parliament (July 2022 – present), the membership of the committee is the following:

Member	Party	Electorate
Milton Dick (chair)	Labor	Division of Oxley, Queensland
Stephen Bates	Greens	Division of Brisbane, Queensland
Alison Byrnes	Labor	Division of Cunningham, New South Wales
Mark Coulton	Nationals	Division of Parkes, New South Wales
Mike Freelander	Labor	Division of Macarthur, New South Wales
Carina Garland	Labor	Division of Chisholm, Victoria
Melissa Price	Liberal	Division of Durack, Western Australia
Rowan Ramsey	Liberal	Division of Grey, South Australia
Tracey Roberts	Labor	Division of Pearce, Western Australia
Joanne Ryan	Labor	Division of Lalor, Victoria
Rebecca Sharkie	Centre Alliance	Division of Mayo, South Australia
David Smith	Labor	Division of Bean, Australian Capital Territory
Anne Stanley	Labor	Division of Werriwa, New South Wales
Bert Van Manen	Liberal National	Division of Forde, Queensland

The Deputy Speaker can substitute for the Speaker in his absence:

Member	Party	Electorate
Sharon Claydon	Labor	Division of Newcastle, New South Wales

== See also ==
- Australian House of Representatives committees
- Selection Committee
