= Selection Committee =

Selection Committee may refer to:

- Selection Committee (Australia), a committee of the Australian House of Representatives
- Selection Committee (Hong Kong), an electoral college in Hong Kong
- NCAA Selection Committee, a committee which governs the selection process for the NCAA Division I men's and women's basketball tournaments

== See also ==
- Committee of Selection
