= Sulaiman Daud =

Malaysian politician

Yang Berbahagia Tan Sri Datuk Amar Sulaiman Daud PSM DA PNBS SIMP DSSA JBS
- سليمان داود

Member of the Malaysian Parliament for Petra Jaya, Sarawak
- In office 21 October 1990 – 21 March 2004
- Preceded by: Constituency established
- Succeeded by: Fadillah Yusof

Member of the Malaysian Parliament for Santubong, Sarawak
- In office 1974–1990
- Preceded by: Constituency established
- Succeeded by: Rohani Abdul Karim

Personal details
- Born: Sulaiman bin Daud; 4 March 1933 Kuching, Kingdom of Sarawak
- Died: 23 March 2010 (aged 77) Kuala Lumpur, Malaysia
- Party: Parti Pesaka Bumiputera Bersatu (PBB)
- Other political affiliations: Barisan Nasional (BN)
- Spouse: Naemah Hasbi (Deceased)
- Children: 4
- Occupation: Politician

Sulaiman bin Daud (Jawi: سليمان بن داود; ) (4 March 1933 – 23 March 2010) was a Malaysian politician who held seven cabinet posts in the Malaysian government between 1981 and 1999, including as Federal Minister of Education. He represented the constituency of Santubong (1974 – 1990) and Petra Jaya (1990 – 2004) in the Parliament of Malaysia and was a member of the Parti Pesaka Bumiputera Bersatu (PBB) in the Barisan Nasional (BN) coalition. He was Chancellor of the International Medical University from 2005 to 2010.

Sulaiman was born in Kuching, Sarawak and was a dentist including in the government hospital in Kuala Belait, Brunei before entering politics. He graduated from the University of Otago in New Zealand. He died aged 77 of liver cancer at the Kuala Lumpur Hospital on 23 March 2010. He had four children.

In 2018, a bridge on Matang-Stapok in Sarawak named as 'Sulaiman Daud Bridge' in honour of him. A few roads in the township Taman Tun Dr Ismail, at Kuala Lumpur known as Jalan Datuk Sulaiman was named after him next to another Sarawakian politician, Persiaran Abang Haji Openg, named after Abang Haji Openg.

== Election results ==
Parliament of Malaysia
Year	Constituency	Candidate	Votes	Pct	Opponent(s)	Votes	Pct	Ballots cast	Majority	Turnout
1974	P133 Santubong	Sulaiman Daud (PBB)	9,929	66.69%	Jerry Martin (SNAP)	4,960	33.31%	15,494	4,969	76.90%
1978	P133 Santubong	Sulaiman Daud (PBB)	12,683	64.42%	Ali Kawi (PAJAR)	7,005	35.58%		5,678	
1982	P133 Santubong	Sulaiman Daud (PBB)	Unopposed							
1986	P156 Santubong	Sulaiman Daud (PBB)	Unopposed							
1990	P156 Petra Jaya	Sulaiman Daud (PBB)	12,686	80.46%	Mustapha Ismail (PERMAS)	3,080	19.54%	16,053	9,606	62.41%
1995	P168 Petra Jaya	Sulaiman Daud (PBB)	Unopposed							
1999	P168 Petra Jaya	Sulaiman Daud (PBB)	11,878	56.87%	Wan Zainal Abidin Wan Senusi (keADILan)	9,008	43.13%	21,672	2,870	61.60%

== Honours ==
- Malaysia
  - Commander of the Order of Loyalty to the Crown of Malaysia (PSM) – Tan Sri (2000)
- Sarawak
  - Companion of the Most Exalted Order of the Star of Sarawak (JBS)
  - Knight Commander of the Most Exalted Order of the Star of Sarawak (PNBS) – formerly Dato', now Dato Sri (1981)
  - Knight Commander of the Order of the Star of Hornbill Sarawak (DA) – Datuk Amar (1991)
- Pahang
  - Grand Knight of the Order of the Crown of Pahang (SIMP) – formerly Dato', now Dato' Indera (1985)
- Selangor
  - Knight Companion of the Order of Sultan Salahuddin Abdul Aziz Shah (DSSA) – Dato' (1992)
