= Charles Santiago =

Malaysian politician (born 1960)

- சார்ல்ஸ் சந்தியாகோ
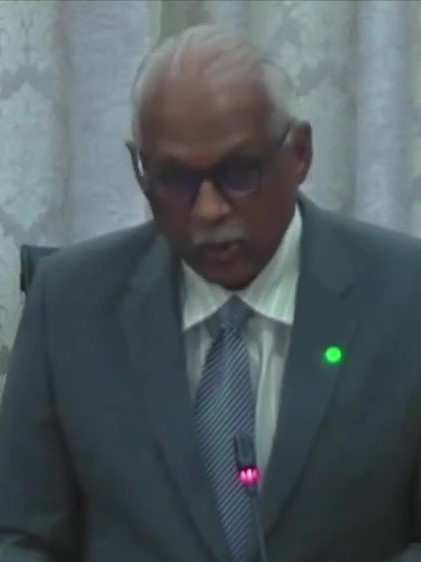

Chairman of the National Water Services Commission
- In office 20 March 2023 – 06 May 2025
- Minister: Nik Nazmi Nik Ahmad
- In office 1 November 2018 – 10 April 2020
- Minister: Xavier Jayakumar Arulanandam (2018–2020); Tuan Ibrahim Tuan Man (2020)

Chairman of the Human Rights and Constitutional Affairs Select Committee
- In office 4 December 2019 – 19 November 2022
- Preceded by: Position established

Member of the Malaysian Parliament for Klang
- In office 8 March 2008 – 19 November 2022
- Preceded by: Tan Yee Kew (BN–MCA)
- Succeeded by: Ganabatirau Veraman (PH–DAP)
- Majority: 17,701 (2008); 24,685 (2013); 78,773 (2018)

Personal details
- Born: Charles Anthony s/o R. Santiago; 1 November 1960 (age 65) Selangor, Federation of Malaya (now Malaysia)
- Citizenship: Malaysian
- Party: Democratic Action Party (DAP)
- Other political affiliations: Pakatan Rakyat (PR) (2008–2015); Pakatan Harapan (PH) (since 2015)
- Education: The New School
- Occupation: Politician

Charles Anthony s/o R. Santiago (Tamil: சார்ல்ஸ் சந்தியாகோ, romanized: Cārls Cantiyākō; born 1 November 1960) is a Malaysian politician from the Democratic Action Party (DAP), a component party of the Pakatan Harapan (PH) coalition who has served as Chairman of the National Water Services Commission (SPAN) for the second term since March 2023 and for the first term from November 2018 to his removal from the position in April 2020. He is also Chairman of the Association of Southeast Asian Nations (ASEAN) Parliamentarians for Human Rights (APHR). He served as the Member of Parliament (MP) for Klang from March 2008 to November 2022, Chairman of the Human Rights and Constitutional Affairs Select Committee from December 2019 to November 2022.

== Political career ==
Santiago was first elected to Parliament in the 2008 election winning the seat of Klang from the governing Barisan Nasional (BN) coalition. Prior to his election, Santiago was an economist and worked for non-governmental organisations such as the Coalition Against Water Privatisation and Monitoring Sustainability of Globalisation Malaysia. Santiago was re-elected to Parliament for Klang constituency in the consecutive 2013 and 2018 general elections.

== Election results ==
Parliament of Malaysia
Year	Constituency	Candidate	Votes	Pct	Opponent(s)	Votes	Pct	Ballots cast	Majority	Turnout
2008	P110 Klang	Charles Santiago (DAP)	37,990	65.18%	Ch'ng Toh Eng (MCA)	20,289	34.81%	59,323	17,701	76.23%
2013	P110 Klang	Charles Santiago (DAP)	53,719	64.82%	Teh Kim Poo (MCA)	29,034	35.04%	84,214	24,685	86.75%
2018	P110 Klang	Charles Santiago (DAP)	98,279	77.34%	Ching Eu Boon (MCA)	19,506	15.35%	128,536	78,773	86.06%
2018	P110 Klang	Charles Santiago (DAP)	98,279	77.34%	Khairul Shah Abdullah (PAS)	9,169	7.22%	128,536	78,773	86.06%
2018	P110 Klang	Charles Santiago (DAP)	98,279	77.34%	Puvananderan Ganasamoorthy (IND)	120	0.09%	128,536	78,773	86.06%

== See also ==
- Klang (federal constituency)

Political offices
New creation	Chairperson of Human Rights and Constitutional Affairs Select Committee; 4 December 2019–present	Incumbent
Parliament of Malaysia
Preceded by Tan Yee Kew	Member of Parliament for Klang; 8 March 2008–present	Incumbent
