= Fadillah Yusof =

Malaysian politician (born 1962)

Yang Amat Berhormat Datuk Amar Fadillah Yusof DA SPMS SSAP DGSM PNBS PGBK ABS MP
- فضيلة يوسف
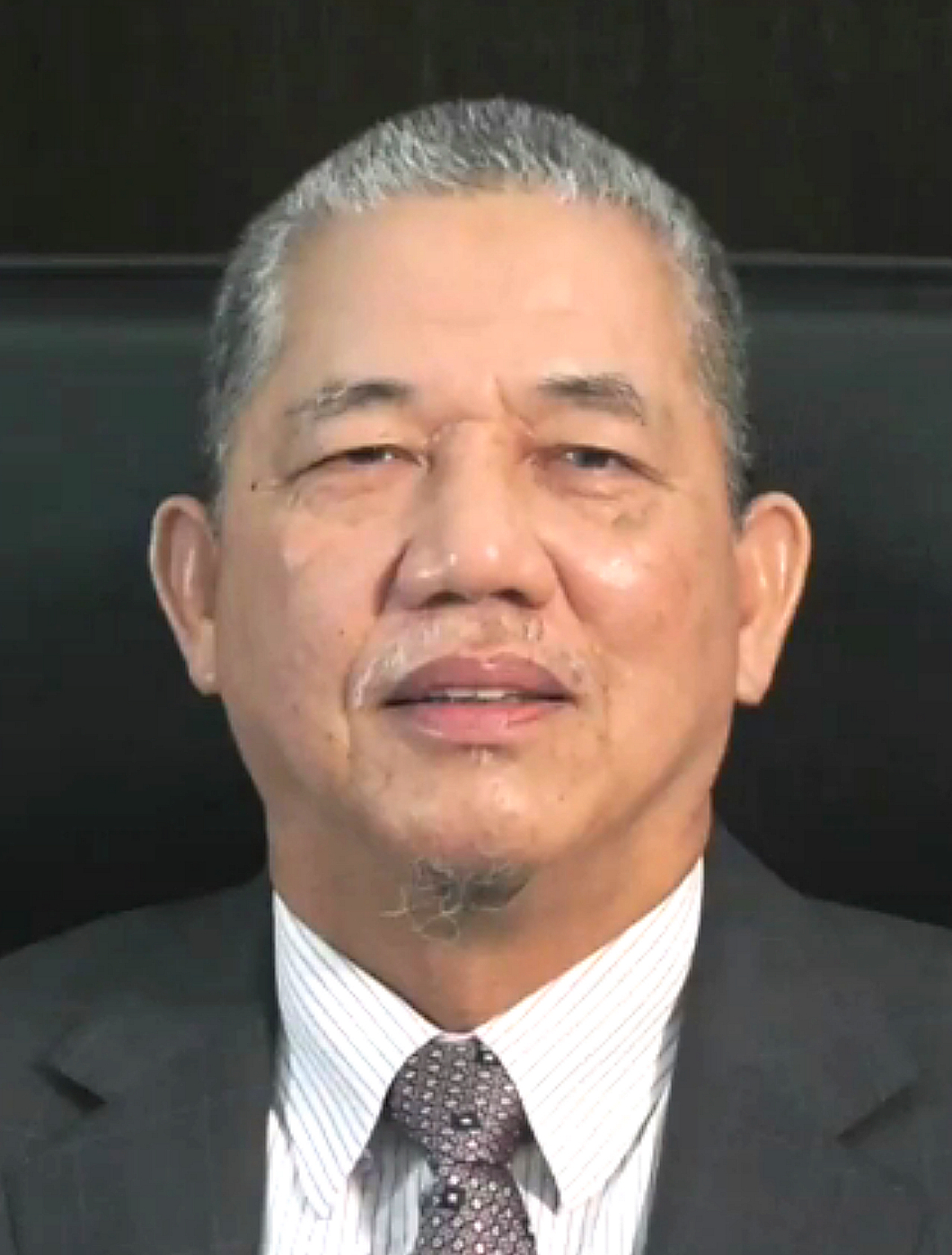
- Fadillah in 2021

14th Deputy Prime Minister of Malaysia
- Incumbent
- Assumed office 3 December 2022 Serving with Ahmad Zahid Hamidi
- Monarchs: Abdullah; Ibrahim Iskandar
- Prime Minister: Anwar Ibrahim
- Preceded by: Ismail Sabri Yaakob (Note: Office vacant between August 2021 and December 2022.)

Minister of Energy Transition and Water Transformation
- Incumbent
- Assumed office 7 February 2024
- Monarch: Ibrahim Iskandar
- Prime Minister: Anwar Ibrahim
- Deputy: Akmal Nasrullah Mohd Nasir (2023–2025); Abdul Rahman Mohamad (since 2025)
- Preceded by: Himself (Minister of Energy Transition and Public Utilities)
- Constituency: Petra Jaya

Senior Vice President of the Parti Pesaka Bumiputera Bersatu
- Incumbent
- Assumed office 2017 Serving with Michael Manyin Jawong
- President: Abang Abdul Rahman Johari Abang Openg
- Succeeded by
Former parliamentary offices
Minister of Energy Transition and Public Utilities
In office 12 December 2023 – 7 February 2024
Monarchs	Abdullah (2022–2024); Ibrahim Iskandar (2024)
Prime Minister	Anwar Ibrahim
Deputy	Akmal Nasrullah Mohd Nasir
Preceded by	Nik Nazmi (Minister of Natural Resources and Environmental Sustainability)
Succeeded by	Himself (Minister of Energy Transition and Water Transformation)
Constituency	Petra Jaya
Minister of Plantation and Commodities
In office 3 December 2022 – 12 December 2023
Monarch	Abdullah
Prime Minister	Anwar Ibrahim
Deputy	Siti Aminah Aching
Preceded by	Zuraida Kamaruddin
Succeeded by	Johari Abdul Ghani
Senior Minister of Works
In office 30 August 2021 – 24 November 2022
Monarch	Abdullah
Prime Minister	Ismail Sabri Yaakob
Preceded by	Himself
Succeeded by	Position abolished
Senior Minister of Infrastructure Development
In office 10 March 2020 – 16 August 2021
Monarch	Abdullah
Prime Minister	Muhyiddin Yassin
Preceded by	Position established
Succeeded by	Himself
Minister of Works
In office 30 August 2021 – 24 November 2022
Monarch	Abdullah
Prime Minister	Ismail Sabri Yaakob
Preceded by	Himself
Succeeded by	Alexander Nanta Linggi
In office 10 March 2020 – 16 August 2021
Monarch	Abdullah
Prime Minister	Muhyiddin Yassin
Preceded by	Baru Bian
Succeeded by	Himself
In office 16 May 2013 – 10 May 2018
Monarchs	Abdul Halim (2013–2016); Muhammad V (2016–2018)
Prime Minister	Najib Razak
Preceded by	Shaziman Abu Mansor
Succeeded by	Baru Bian
Deputy Minister of Science, Technology and Innovation
In office 19 March 2008 – 15 May 2013
Monarchs	Mizan Zainal Abidin (2008–2011); Abdul Halim (2011–2013)
Prime Minister	Abdullah Ahmad Badawi (2008–2009); Najib Razak (2009–2013)
Preceded by	Kong Cho Ha
Succeeded by	Abu Bakar Mohamad Diah
Youth Chief of the Parti Pesaka Bumiputera Bersatu
In office 2007–2017
President	Abdul Taib Mahmud (2007–2014); Adenan Satem (2014–2017); Abang Abdul Rahman Johari Abang Openg (2017)
Succeeded by	Gerald Rentap Jabu

Member of the Malaysian Parliament for Petra Jaya
- Incumbent
- Assumed office 21 March 2004
- Preceded by: Sulaiman Daud (BN–PBB)
- Majority: 12,816 (2004); 14,397 (2008); 21,443 (2013); 15,017 (2018); 41,363 (2022)

Personal details
- Born: Fadillah bin Yusof; 17 April 1962 (age 64) Sibu, Crown Colony of Sarawak
- Citizenship: Malaysia
- Party: Parti Pesaka Bumiputera Bersatu (PBB) (since 1989)
- Other political affiliations: Barisan Nasional (BN) (1989–2018); Gabungan Parti Sarawak (GPS) (since 2018)
- Spouse: Ruziah Mohd Tahir
- Children: 5
- Education: University of Malaya (LLB)
- Occupation: Politician
- Profession: Lawyer
- Fadillah Yusof on Parliament of Malaysia

Fadillah bin Yusof (Jawi: فضيلة بن يوسف; born 17 April 1962) is a Malaysian politician and lawyer who has served as the Deputy Prime Minister of Malaysia since 2022, Minister of Energy Transition and Water Transformation since 2023 and the Member of Parliament (MP) for Petra Jaya since March 2004. He is the first deputy prime minister from Sarawak, one of the Borneo states in Malaysia and the second deputy prime minister not from the United Malays National Organisation (UMNO) after Wan Azizah Wan Ismail from the People's Justice Party (PKR).

Previously, he served as the Minister of Plantation and Commodities from December 2022 to December 2023, Senior Minister in charge of Works and Minister of Works for the third term in the Barisan Nasional (BN) administration under former prime minister Ismail Sabri Yaakob from August 2021 to the collapse of the BN administration in November 2022 and the Member of Parliament (MP) for Petra Jaya since March 2004. He served as the Senior Minister in charge of Infrastructure Development and Minister of Works for the second term in the PN administration under former prime minister Muhyiddin Yassin from March 2020 to August 2021 and for the first term in Barisan Nasional (BN) administration under former prime minister Najib Razak from May 2013 to May 2018, Chair of the Science, Innovation and Environment Select Committee, one of only two select committees led by an opposition MP from December 2019 to his reappointment as a Minister in March 2020.

Fadillah is a member of Parti Pesaka Bumiputera Bersatu (PBB), a component party of the Gabungan Parti Sarawak (GPS) coalition. He is also the Parliamentary Whip of GPS and has served as Senior Vice President of PBB since 2017. He was the Youth Chief of PBB from 2007 to 2017.

== Early life and education ==
Fadillah bin Yusof was born on 17 April 1962 in Kampung Bahru, Sibu, Sarawak, and is the ninth of 14 siblings. His father, Yusof Merais, was involved in the anti-cession movement in Sarawak, opposing British colonial rule after 1946. Yusof was active in the Malay youth movement and later the Sarawakian youth front, and was imprisoned twice — first in connection with the 1949 assassination of British Governor Duncan Stewart, and again during the 1962 confrontation over the formation of Malaysia. During his imprisonment, Fadillah's mother, Dayang Rosnah Abang Madeli, worked as a domestic helper and seamstress to support the family.

Fadillah and his siblings helped contribute to the family's income by collecting and selling farm produce. He began his education at St. Mary's Primary School in Sibu before continuing at Panglima Bukit Gantang Secondary School in Parit Buntar, Perak. This move was made possible through a scholarship from Yayasan Sarawak, which also included a student exchange programme.

In 1986, Fadillah completed a Bachelor of Laws (LLB) degree in both Civil and Sharia law at the University of Malaya. During his time there, he often helped new Sarawakian students settle into university life, sometimes prioritising their needs even when it affected his own schedule.

== Early career ==
After graduation, Fadillah practiced law briefly in Kuala Lumpur before returning to Sarawak. His work there gradually involved advising elected representatives and those involved in politics, which eventually led him to serve as an independent legal advisor for Parti Pesaka Bumiputera Bersatu (PBB). In 1989, he joined politics as a member of PBB, which at that time was a component party of Barisan Nasional (BN) coalition.

== Political career ==
Fadillah first ran for parliament in the 11th Malaysian general election, having previously been an official in Parti Pesaka Bumiputera Bersatu (PBB) and a lawyer. He won the election for the seat of Petra Jaya.

=== Ministerial offices ===
After being re-elected in the 12th Malaysian general election, Fadillah was appointed Deputy Minister for Science, Technology and Innovation by Prime Minister Abdullah Ahmad Badawi. He served under Minister Maximus Ongkili and was responsible for portfolios involving agencies including MIMOS Berhad, the Malaysian Nuclear Agency and the National Space Agency. His duties included matters relating to science and technology policy, parliamentary legislation and the ministry's participation in biotechnology programmes and international scientific conferences, including the Malaysian Chemical Congress. His tenure as a federal deputy minister covered the administrations of Prime Ministers Abdullah Ahmad Badawi from 2008 to 2009 and Najib Razak from 2009 to 2013.

After the 13th Malaysian general election, Fadillah was promoted to full minister as Minister of Works under the new Cabinet line-up of Prime Minister Najib Razak. As minister, he oversaw the Ministry of Works and agencies under its jurisdiction, including the Construction Industry Development Board and the Malaysian Highway Authority. His responsibilities included federal infrastructure policy, public works, government construction projects and the federal road network. During his tenure, the Pan Borneo Sarawak Highway project entered its implementation phase. The first phase, covering approximately 1,089 kilometres, was officially launched in March 2015. The project was estimated at RM16.5 billion and adopted a project delivery partner (PDP) model, with financing provided through sukuk issued by DanaInfra Nasional Berhad. By the end of his tenure in 2018, all 11 major work packages had been awarded to contractors, with overall physical progress reported at approximately 20%. Fadillah also oversaw the implementation of the Construction Industry Transformation Plan 2016–2020, which set out measures to modernise the construction sector, including greater adoption of industrialised building system technology in government projects. His ministry was also involved in the development of major expressway projects in the Klang Valley, including the Sungai Besi–Ulu Kelang Expressway (SUKE) and the East Klang Valley Expressway (EKVE), which were developed under private concession arrangements. His tenure ended in May 2018 following the 14th general election and the subsequent formation of a new federal government following the defeat of Barisan Nasional (BN).

Subsequently, Fadillah became a member of the federal opposition after BN ceased to form the federal government though he retained his parliamentary seat. On 12 June 2018, Parti Pesaka Bumiputera Bersatu, together with three other Sarawak-based parties, withdrew from BN and subsequently formed Gabungan Parti Sarawak (GPS). Following the formation of GPS, Fadillah was appointed chief whip of the GPS parliamentary bloc. In this capacity, he was responsible for coordinating the participation of GPS members of parliament in parliamentary proceedings, including attendance, parliamentary strategy and voting positions. GPS had 19 members of parliament during this period. In December 2019, Fadillah was appointed chairman of the Parliamentary Special Select Committee on Science, Innovation and the Environment. The committee examined matters within its portfolio and provided parliamentary oversight of government policies and programmes relating to science, innovation and the environment during the Pakatan Harapan (PH) administration. His period as a federal opposition member ended in March 2020 following a change in the composition of the federal government and the formation of a new administration.

In March 2020, Fadillah was reappointed as Minister of Works following the formation of the Perikatan Nasional (PN) government. The administration was formed following the political crisis known as the Sheraton Move in late February 2020, which resulted in the resignation of Prime Minister Mahathir Mohamad and the withdrawal of Parti Pribumi Bersatu Malaysia (BERSATU) from the Pakatan Harapan (PH) coalition. Under Prime Minister Muhyiddin Yassin, Fadillah was appointed one of four senior ministers, overseeing the infrastructure cluster. He was the only representative from GPS appointed to a senior ministerial position in the administration. During his tenure, Fadillah's responsibilities included overseeing the construction sector during the COVID-19 pandemic. The Ministry of Works and the Construction Industry Development Board developed standard operating procedures for construction sites, including health screening requirements for workers and measures concerning workers' accommodation. Construction activities were affected by supply chain disruptions and restrictions imposed under the Movement Control Order. The Ministry of Works reported a 99% achievement rate for its 2020 annual physical programme. Fadillah also oversaw the implementation of the Sarawak Pan Borneo Highway project, which was subsequently converted from the Project Delivery Partner model to a conventional procurement model administered by the Public Works Department. By early 2021, the remaining 11 major work packages had recorded an average physical progress of approximately 60 percent. Fadillah's tenure as Minister of Works and senior minister ended on 16 August 2021 following the resignation of Muhyiddin. The resignation followed the withdrawal of support from a number of members of parliament, resulting in the loss of the government's majority in the Dewan Rakyat. Muhyiddin and his cabinet subsequently resigned from office.

Fadillah was reappointed as senior minister of works on 30 August 2021 under the cabinet of Prime Minister Ismail Sabri Yaakob. The appointment followed the resignation of Muhyiddin and retained Fadillah as the minister responsible for the Ministry of Works. He was also the sole representative of GPS among the senior ministers. During this period, his responsibilities included the recovery of the construction sector following the pandemic and the implementation of infrastructure projects. The remaining work packages of the Pan Borneo Highway phase 1 in Sarawak recorded increased physical progress from approximately 70% to an average of 86% by the third quarter of 2022. Several sections of the project were also completed and opened to traffic, including the Serian alignment, which was opened to the public in December 2021. Fadillah was also involved in the restructuring of concession arrangements for six tolled highways in Peninsular Malaysia, with the stated objective of preventing increases in toll rates. His ministry also introduced measures to expand the use of building information modelling as part of the digitalisation of the construction industry. During the same period, Fadillah continued to serve as GPS parliamentary chief whip. In this capacity, he was involved in the coalition's support for the memorandum of understanding on political transformation and stability signed between the federal government and PH in September 2021. His tenure as senior minister of works ended on 24 November 2022 following the formation of a new federal government after the 15th general election. Anwar Ibrahim was subsequently appointed prime minister.

=== Deputy Prime Minister ===
In the 2022 general election, Fadillah managed to retain his seat, this time with a significantly larger majority. Following the elections, no single party secured a majority to form the federal government. Consequently, Yang di-Pertuan Agong Al-Sultan Abdullah Ri'ayatuddin Al-Mustafa Billah Shah proposed the formation of a unity government, with Anwar Ibrahim eventually appointed as its leader on 24 November 2022.

In a cabinet announcement on 2 December 2022, Fadillah was appointed Deputy Prime Minister alongside Ahmad Zahid Hamidi. Simultaneously, he was assigned the role of Minister of Plantation and Commodities. Fadillah's appointment is of historic significance as he is the first individual from Sarawak to hold the country's second-highest political office since the formation of Malaysia. Sarawak is one of the East Malaysian states.

== Personal life ==
Fadillah is married to Ruziah Mohd Tahir. The couple has five children.

In 2026, Fadillah underwent heart bypass surgery at the National Heart Institute on the advice and recommendations of the team of medical experts who treated him.

== Election results ==
Parliament of Malaysia
Year	Constituency	Candidate	Votes	Pct	Opponent(s)	Votes	Pct	Ballots cast	Majority	Turnout
2004	P194 Petra Jaya	Fadillah Yusof (PBB)	18,236	77.09%	Wan Zainal Abidin Wan Senusi (PKR)	5,420	22.91%	24,195	12,816	61.46%
2008	P194 Petra Jaya	Fadillah Yusof (PBB)	19,515	79.22%	Mohamad Jolhi (PKR)	5,118	20.78%	25,027	14,397	61.74%
2013	P194 Petra Jaya	Fadillah Yusof (PBB)	29,559	78.46%	Ahmad Nazib Johari (PKR)	8,116	21.54%	38,170	21,443	76.70%
2018	P194 Petra Jaya	Fadillah Yusof (PBB)	28,306	65.91%	Nor Irwan Ahmat Nor (PKR)	13,289	30.94%	43,513	15,017	75.12%
2018	P194 Petra Jaya	Fadillah Yusof (PBB)	28,306	65.91%	Hamdan Sani (PAS)	1,350	3.14%	43,513	15,017	75.12%
2022	P194 Petra Jaya	Fadillah Yusof (PBB)	54,745	79.15%	Sopian Julaihi (PKR)	13,382	19.35%	69,163	41,363	62.98%
2022	P194 Petra Jaya	Fadillah Yusof (PBB)	54,745	79.15%	Othman Abdillah (SEDAR)	1,036	1.50%	69,163	41,363	62.98%

== Honours ==
=== Honours of Malaysia ===
- Malaysia
  - Recipient of the 15th Yang di-Pertuan Agong Installation Medal (2017)
  - Recipient of the 17th Yang di-Pertuan Agong Installation Medal (2024)
- Malacca
  - Grand Commander of the Exalted Order of Malacca (DGSM) – Datuk Seri (2014)
- Pahang
  - Knight Grand Companion of the Order of Sultan Ahmad Shah of Pahang (SSAP) – Dato' Sri (2014)
- Perlis
  - Recipient of Tuanku Syed Sirajuddin Jamalullail Silver Jubilee Medal (2025)
- Sarawak
  - Knight Commander of the Order of the Star of Hornbill Sarawak (DA) – Datuk Amar (2025)
  - Knight Commander of the Most Exalted Order of the Star of Sarawak (PNBS) – Dato Sri (2022)
  - Commander of the Order of the Star of Hornbill Sarawak (PGBK) – Datuk (2010)
  - Member of the Most Exalted Order of the Star of Sarawak (ABS)
  - Recipient of the Sarawak Independence Golden Jubilee Medal (2013)
  - Gold Medal of the Sarawak Independence Diamond Jubilee Medal (2023)
- Selangor
  - Knight Grand Commander of the Order of the Crown of Selangor (SPMS) – Dato' Seri (2026)
  - Recipient of the Sultan Sharafuddin Silver Jubilee Medal (2026)

== Notes ==
Parliament of Malaysia
Preceded by Sulaiman Daud	Member of Parliament for Petra Jaya; 2004–present	Incumbent
Political offices
Preceded by Kong Cho Ha	Deputy Minister of Science, Technology and Innovation; 2008–2013	Succeeded by Abu Bakar Mohamad Diah
Preceded by Shaziman Abu Mansor	Minister of Works; 2013–2018	Succeeded by Baru Bian
