= Santubong (federal constituency) =

Federal constituency of Sarawak, Malaysia

Santubong (P193)
Sarawak constituency

Federal constituency
- Legislature: Dewan Rakyat
- MP: Nancy Shukri; GPS
- Constituency created: 1968
- First contested: 1969
- Last contested: 2022

Demographics
- Population (2020): 117,751
- Electors (2022): 79,540
- Area (km²): 1,581
- Pop. density (per km²): 74.5

Santubong is a federal constituency in Kuching Division (Lundu District and Kuching District), Sarawak, Malaysia, that has been represented in the Dewan Rakyat since 1971.

The federal constituency was created in the 1968 redistribution and is mandated to return a single member to the Dewan Rakyat under the first past the post voting system.

== Demographics ==
https://ge15.orientaldaily.com.my/seats/sarawak/p

Ethnic breakdown of Santubong's electorate as of 2022
1. Malay-Muslim bumiputera (81.8%)
2. Sarawak bumiputera (10.4%)
3. Chinese (7.50%)
4. Other ethnicities (0.30%)

As of 2020, Santubong has a population of 117,751 people.

Age breakdown of Santubong's electorate as of 2022
1. 18-20 (8.21%)
2. 21-29 (25.1%)
3. 30-39 (21.7%)
4. 40-49 (16.9%)
5. 50-59 (13.8%)
6. 60-69 (8.85%)
7. 70-79 (4.02%)
8. 80-89 (1.13%)
9. above 90 (0.26%)
Gender breakdown of Santubong's electorate as of 2022
1. Male (49.5%)
2. Female (50.5%)

== History ==
=== Polling districts ===
According to the gazette issued on 31 October 2022, the Santubong constituency has a total of 38 polling districts.

State constituency	Polling Districts	Code	Location
Tanjong Datu（N03）	Telok Melano	193/03/01	SK Telok Melano
Tanjong Datu（N03）	Pueh	193/03/02	SK Pueh
Tanjong Datu（N03）	Sebat	193/03/03	SK Kpg. Sebat
Tanjong Datu（N03）	Sematan	193/03/04	SJK (C) Chung Hua Sematan
Tanjong Datu（N03）	Seling	193/03/05	SK Bumiputera Lundu
Tanjong Datu（N03）	Stunggang	193/03/06	SJ Kpg. Stunggang Lundu
Tanjong Datu（N03）	Lundu	193/03/07	SJK (C) Chung Hua Lundu
Tanjong Datu（N03）	Perigi	193/03/08	SJK (C) Chung Hua Selarat / Serayan
Tanjong Datu（N03）	Sekambal	193/03/09	SK Lebai Mentali Kpg. Sekambal
Tanjong Datu（N03）	Bajo	193/03/10	SK Siar Campuran Kpg. Bajo Lundu
Tanjong Datu（N03）	Kampung Sebemban	193/03/11	SMK Lundu
Tanjong Datu（N03）	Temelan	193/03/12	SK Temelan / Stunggang
Tanjong Datu（N03）	Sampadi	193/03/13	SK Kpg. Sampadi
Tanjong Datu（N03）	Stoh	193/03/14	SK Stoh
Tanjong Datu（N03）	Rambungan	193/03/15	Balai Raya Kpg. Rambungan; Dewan Masyarakat Kpg. Sg. Belian
Pantai Damai (N04)	Telaga Air	193/04/01	SK Telaga Air; Dewan Selang Laut
Pantai Damai (N04)	Salak	193/04/02	SK Kpg. Salak
Pantai Damai (N04)	Temenggong	193/04/03	SK Kpg. Temenggong
Pantai Damai (N04)	Jaya Bakti	193/04/04	Surau Kpg. Jaya Bakti
Pantai Damai (N04)	Santubong	193/04/05	SK Santubong
Pantai Damai (N04)	Buntal	193/04/06	SK Kpg. Buntal; Dewan Serbagauna Sg. Lumut
Pantai Damai (N04)	Rampangi	193/04/07	SK Rampangi; SK Bandar Samariang
Pantai Damai (N04)	Sejinjang	193/04/08	SK Pasir Pandak
Pantai Damai (N04)	Astana	193/04/09	SK Kpg. Gersik; Dewan Serbaguna Panglima Seman Lama
Pantai Damai (N04)	Demak Baru	193/04/10	SMK Tun Abang Haji Openg
Pantai Damai (N04)	Semarang	193/04/11	SK Pulo; SA Al Falah Al Islamiyyah Kpg. Pulo
Pantai Damai (N04)	Bintawa	193/04/12	SK Matu Baru
Demak Laut (N05)	Tanjong Embang	193/05/01	SK Beradek
Demak Laut (N05)	Muara Tebas	193/05/02	SK Muara Tebas
Demak Laut (N05)	Geobilt	193/05/03	SK Geobilt
Demak Laut (N05)	Bako	193/05/04	SK Bako; Dewan Hijrah 2008
Demak Laut (N05)	Sejingkat	193/05/05	SK Sejingkat; Tadika Kemas Taman Sepakat Jaya
Demak Laut (N05)	Senari	193/05/06	SK Senari
Demak Laut (N05)	Tanjung Bako	193/05/07	SK Kpg. Tanjong Bako
Demak Laut (N05)	Pinggan Jaya	193/05/08	SK Muhibbah (Seberang Pending)
Demak Laut (N05)	Tabuan Melayu	193/05/09	SK Tabuan Hilir; Dewan Daro Sri Wan Junaidi Kpg. Tabuan Lot
Demak Laut (N05)	Muara Tabuan	193/05/10	SK Tabuan
Demak Laut (N05)	Tabuan Hulu	193/05/11	Balai Raya Kpg. Tabuan Hulu Hj Drahman

=== Representation history ===
Members of Parliament for Santubong
Parliament	No	Years	Member	Party
Constituency created
		1969-1971	Parliament was suspended	
3rd	P123	1971-1973	Awang Wal Awang Abu (اوڠ ول اوڠ ابو)	BUMIPUTERA
3rd	P123	1973-1974	Awang Wal Awang Abu (اوڠ ول اوڠ ابو)	BN (PBB)
4th	P133	1974-1978	Sulaiman Daud (سليمان بن داود)	BN (PBB)
5th	P133	1978-1982	Sulaiman Daud (سليمان بن داود)	BN (PBB)
6th	P133	1982-1986	Sulaiman Daud (سليمان بن داود)	BN (PBB)
7th	P156	1986-1990	Sulaiman Daud (سليمان بن داود)	BN (PBB)
8th	P155	1990-1995	Rohani Abdul Karim (روحاني بنت عبدالكريم)	BN (PBB)
9th	P167	1995-1999	Rohani Abdul Karim (روحاني بنت عبدالكريم)	BN (PBB)
10th	P167	1999-2004	Rohani Abdul Karim (روحاني بنت عبدالكريم)	BN (PBB)
11th	P193	2004-2008	Wan Junaidi Tuanku Jaafar (وان جنيدي توانكو جعفر)	BN (PBB)
12th	P193	2008-2013	Wan Junaidi Tuanku Jaafar (وان جنيدي توانكو جعفر)	BN (PBB)
13th	P193	2013-2018	Wan Junaidi Tuanku Jaafar (وان جنيدي توانكو جعفر)	BN (PBB)
14th	P193	2018	Wan Junaidi Tuanku Jaafar (وان جنيدي توانكو جعفر)	BN (PBB)
14th	P193	2018-2022	Wan Junaidi Tuanku Jaafar (وان جنيدي توانكو جعفر)	GPS (PBB)
15th	P193	2022–present	Nancy Shukri (ننسي شكري)	GPS (PBB)

=== State constituency ===
Parliamentary constituency	State constituency					
Parliamentary constituency	1969–1978	1978–1990	1990–1999	1999–2008	2008–2016	2016−present
Santubong				Demak Laut		
Santubong			Pantai Damai			
Santubong		Petra Jaya				
Santubong		Satok				
Santubong			Sejingkat			
Santubong	Sekama					
Santubong	Semariang					
Santubong					Tanjong Datu	

=== Historical boundaries ===
State Constituency	Area					
State Constituency	1968	1977	1987	1996	2005	2015
Demak Laut				Bako; Kampung Muhibah; Muara Tebas; Sejingkat; Sungai Apong		Bako; Beliong; Kampung Muhibah; Muara Tebas; Sejingkat
Pantai Damai			Kampung Rambungan; Pantai Damai; Sampadi; Santubong; Sejinjang		Kampung Telaga Air; Pantai Damai; Santubong; Sejinjang; Tabuan Hilir	
Petra Jaya		Matang; Petra Jaya; Samariang; Santubong; Serapi				
Satok		Kampung Lintang; Kampung Paroh; Satok; Tupong; Taman Fitrah				
Sejingkat			Bako; Kampung Muhibah; Muara Tebas; Sejingkat; Sungai Apong			
Sekama	Kampung Kudei; Kampung Paroh; Sekama; Stampin; Tabuan					
Semariang	Kampung Telaga Air; Matang; Petra Jaya; Samariang; Santubong					
Tanjong Datu					Telok Melano; Lundu; Sampadi; Sematan; Tanjong Datu	

=== Current state assembly members ===
No.	State Constituency	Member	Coalition (Party)
N03	Tanjong Datu	Azizul Anuar Adenan	GPS (PBB)
N04	Pantai Damai	Abdul Rahman Junaidi	GPS (PBB)
N05	Demak Laut	Hazland Abang Hipni	GPS (PBB)

=== Local governments & postcodes ===
No.	State Constituency	Local Government	Postcode
N03	Tanjong Datu	Lundu District Council	93010, 93050, 93350, 93450 Kuching; 94500 Lundu
N04	Pantai Damai	Kuching North City Hall	93010, 93050, 93350, 93450 Kuching; 94500 Lundu
N05	Demak Laut	Kuching North City Hall; Kuching South City Council (Tabuan Melayu area); Kota Samarahan Municipal Council (Tanjung Embang area)	93010, 93050, 93350, 93450 Kuching; 94500 Lundu

== Election results ==
Malaysian general election, 2022
Party	Candidate	Votes	%	∆%
GPS	Nancy Shukri	43,739	84.42	▲84.42
PH	Mohamad Zen Peli	5,058	9.76	▲9.76
Independent	Affendi Jeman	3,012	5.81	▲5.00
Total valid votes		51,809	100.00	
Total rejected ballots		650		
Unreturned ballots		303		
Turnout		52,762	66.33	▼7.90
Registered electors		79,540		
Majority		38,681	74.66	▲16.10
GPS gain from BN		Swing		?
Source(s) https://lom.agc.gov.my/ilims/upload/portal/akta/outputp/1753265/PARLIMEN%20SARAWAK%20(PUB%20620).pdf

Malaysian general election, 2018
Party	Candidate	Votes	%	∆%
BN	Wan Junaidi Tuanku Jaafar	26,379	79.28	▼6.29
PKR	Mohamad Fidzuan Zaidi	6,894	20.72	▲7.81
Total valid votes		33,273	100.00	
Total rejected ballots		440		
Unreturned ballots		155		
Turnout		33,868	74.23	▲9.50
Registered electors		45,628		
Majority		19,485	58.56	▼2.22
BN hold		Swing		
Source(s) "His Majesty's Government Gazette - Notice of Contested Election, Parliament for the State of Sarawak [P.U. (B) 247/2018]" (PDF). Attorney General's Chambers of Malaysia. 3 May 2018. "Federal Government Gazette - Results of Contested Election and Statements of the Poll after the Official Addition of Votes, Parliamentary Constituencies for the State of Sarawak [P.U. (B) 321/2018]" (PDF). Attorney General's Chambers of Malaysia. 28 May 2018. Archived from the original (PDF) on 2019-12-29.

Malaysian general election, 2013
Party	Candidate	Votes	%	∆%
BN	Wan Junaidi Tuanku Jaafar	24,655	85.57	▲5.18
PKR	Zulrusdi Mohamad Hol	3,719	12.91	▼6.70
Independent	Affendi Jeman	233	0.81	▲0.81
STAR	Mura Kadir	206	0.71	▲0.71
Total valid votes		28,813	100.00	
Total rejected ballots		394		
Unreturned ballots		79		
Turnout		29,286	79.12	▲14.39
Registered electors		37,017		
Majority		20,936	72.66	▲11.88
BN hold		Swing		
Source(s) "Federal Government Gazette - Notice of Contested Election, Parliament for the State of Sarawak [P.U. (B) 184/2013]" (PDF). Attorney General's Chambers of Malaysia. 26 April 2013. "Federal Government Gazette - Results of Contested Election and Statements of the Poll after the Official Addition of Votes, Parliamentary Constituencies for the State of Sarawak [P.U. (B) 225/2013]" (PDF). Attorney General's Chambers of Malaysia. 22 May 2013. Archived from the original (PDF) on 2018-09-30.

Malaysian general election, 2008
Party	Candidate	Votes	%	∆%
BN	Wan Junaidi Tuanku Jaafar	15,800	80.39	▼5.72
PKR	Rahamat Idil Latip	3,855	19.61	▲19.61
Total valid votes		19,655	100.00	
Total rejected ballots		248		
Unreturned ballots		56		
Turnout		19,959	64.73	▲0.60
Registered electors		30,836		
Majority		11,945	60.78	▼11.44
BN hold		Swing		

Malaysian general election, 2004
Party	Candidate	Votes	%	∆%
BN	Wan Junaidi Tuanku Jaafar	12,590	86.11	▲29.35
Independent	Idris Bohari	2,030	13.89	▲13.89
Total valid votes		14,620	100.00	
Total rejected ballots		244		
Unreturned ballots		38		
Turnout		14,902	64.13	▼3.42
Registered electors		21,974		
Majority		10,560	72.22	▲58.70
BN hold		Swing		

Malaysian general election, 1999
Party	Candidate	Votes	%	∆%
BN	Rohani Abdul Karim	7,955	56.76	▼29.97
PKR	Husaini Hamdan	6,060	43.24	▲43.24
Total valid votes		14,015	100.00	
Total rejected ballots		210		
Unreturned ballots		0		
Turnout		14,225	67.55	▲3.39
Registered electors		21,058		
Majority		1,895	13.52	▼59.94
BN hold		Swing		

Malaysian general election, 1995
Party	Candidate	Votes	%	∆%
BN	Rohani Abdul Karim	11,702	86.73	▲8.46
Independent	Paruwadi Musa	1,791	13.27	▲13.27
Total valid votes		13,493	100.00	
Total rejected ballots		365		
Unreturned ballots		202		
Turnout		14,060	64.16	▼6.50
Registered electors		21,913		
Majority		9,911	73.46	▲16.92
BN hold		Swing		

Malaysian general election, 1990
Party	Candidate	Votes	%	∆%
BN	Rohani Abdul Karim	10,200	78.27	▲78.27
PERMAS	Wan Zainal Abidin Wan Senusi	2,832	21.73	▲21.73
Total valid votes		13,032	100.00	
Total rejected ballots		224		
Unreturned ballots		0		
Turnout		13,256	70.66	
Registered electors		18,759		
Majority		7,368	56.54	
BN hold		Swing		

Malaysian general election, 1986
Party	Candidate	Votes	%	∆%
On the nomination day, Sulaiman Daud won uncontested.
BN	Sulaiman Daud			
Total valid votes			100.00	
Total rejected ballots				
Unreturned ballots				
Turnout				
Registered electors		31,889		
Majority				
BN hold		Swing		

Malaysian general election, 1982
Party	Candidate	Votes	%	∆%
On the nomination day, Sulaiman Daud won uncontested.
BN	Sulaiman Daud			
Total valid votes			100.00	
Total rejected ballots				
Unreturned ballots				
Turnout				
Registered electors		30,261		
Majority				
BN hold		Swing		

Malaysian general election, 1978
Party	Candidate	Votes	%	∆%
BN	Sulaiman Daud	12,683	64.42	▼2.27
Parti Anak Jati Sarawak	Ali Kawi	7,005	35.58	▲35.58
Total valid votes		19,688	100.00	
Total rejected ballots		287		
Unreturned ballots		0		
Turnout		20,140	77.05	▲0.15
Registered electors		26,140		
Majority		5,678	28.84	▼4.54
BN hold		Swing		

Malaysian general election, 1974
Party	Candidate	Votes	%	∆%
BN	Sulaiman Daud	9,929	66.69	▲66.69
SNAP	Jerry Martin	4,960	33.31	▲22.84
Total valid votes		14,889	100.00	
Total rejected ballots		605		
Unreturned ballots		0		
Turnout		15,494	76.90	▼3.90
Registered electors		20,149		
Majority		4,969	33.38	▲28.51
BN gain from PBB		Swing		?

Malaysian general election, 1969
Party	Candidate	Votes	%
PBB	Awang Wal Awang Abu	6,404	47.20
SUPP	Ho Ho Lim	5,744	42.33
SNAP	Ngu Kuang Kee	1,421	10.47
Total valid votes		13,569	100.00
Total rejected ballots		769	
Unreturned ballots		0	
Turnout		14,338	80.80
Registered electors		17,746	
Majority		660	4.87
This was a new constituency created.
