= Azhar Azizan Harun =

Malaysian politician and lawyer

Yang Berbahagia Tan Sri Datuk Azhar Azizan Harun PSM PJN
- ازهر عزيزان هارون
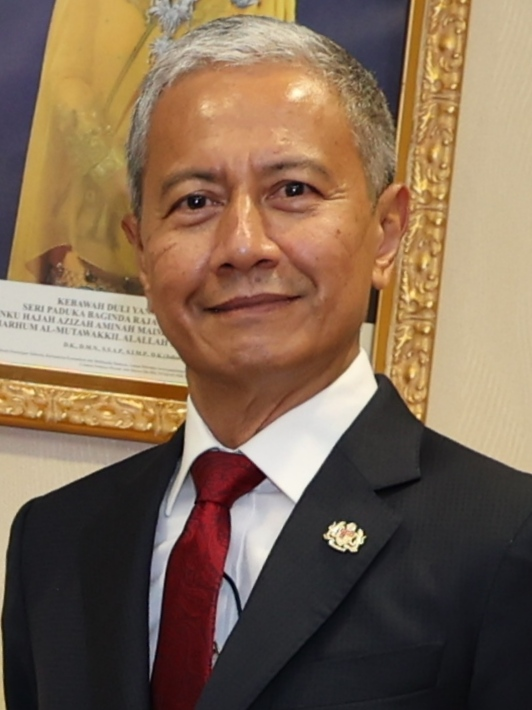
- Azhar in 2022

10th Speaker of the Dewan Rakyat
- In office 13 July 2020 – 18 December 2022
- Monarch: Abdullah
- Prime Minister: Muhyiddin Yassin (2020–2021); Ismail Sabri Yaakob (2021–2022); Anwar Ibrahim (2022)
- Deputy: Mohd Rashid Hasnon (2020–2022); Azalina Othman Said (2020–2021)
- Preceded by: Mohamad Ariff Md Yusof
- Succeeded by: Johari Abdul
- Constituency: Non-MP (Independent)

9th Chairman of the Election Commission of Malaysia
- In office 21 September 2018 – 29 June 2020
- Nominated by: Mahathir Mohamad
- Appointed by: Muhammad V
- Preceded by: Mohd Hashim Abdullah
- Succeeded by: Abdul Ghani Salleh

Personal details
- Born: 26 October 1962 (age 63) Kampung Sanglang, Ayer Hitam, Kedah, Federation of Malaya (now Malaysia)
- Citizenship: Malaysian
- Party: Independent (until 2025); Malaysian United Indigenous Party (BERSATU) (2025–present)
- Spouse(s): Simla Bibi Abdul Gani
- Relatives: Idrus Harun (elder brother)
- Education: University of Malaya (LLB); King's College London (LLM)
- Occupation: Lawyer
- Other names: Art Harun
- Azhar Azizan Harun on Parliament of Malaysia

Azhar bin Azizan Harun (Jawi: ازهر بن عزيزان هارون; born 26 October 1962), also known as Art Harun, is a Malaysian politician and lawyer who served as the 10th Speaker of the Dewan Rakyat from July 2020 to December 2022 and the 9th Chairman of the Election Commission (EC) from September 2018 to his resignation in June 2020.

== Early life and education ==
Azhar was born in Ayer Hitam, Kedah. He is the younger brother of Idrus Harun, who was the Attorney-General of Malaysia from March 2020 until September 2023.

Azhar read law at the University of Malaya and graduated with a degree of Bachelor of Laws in 1986. He then furthered his studies at the King's College London and obtained his degree of Master of Laws (with merit) there.

== Career ==
=== Legal practice ===
Azhar started his career at a firm named Allen & Gledhill in 1987 and also used to work at Tetuan KH Koh, Azhar & Koh in 1992. Then, he continued his career at various law firms like Tetuan Khaw & Hussein, Tetuan TH Su & Partners, Tetuan Lamin & Co, Tetuan Hisham Sobri & Kadir, Tetuan Shafee & Co and Tetuan Cheang & Ariff (owned by Tan Sri Mohamad Ariff Md Yusof, who had become the Parliament Speaker whom Azhar has succeeded later). He was also a defendant lawyer, as well as a solicitor at Tetuan Azhar & Goh.

=== Chairman of Election Commission (2018–2020) ===
Azhar was first appointed as the Chairman of EC on 21 September 2018, not long after the Pakatan Harapan (PH) coalition under new Prime Minister Mahathir Mohamad came into power succeeding their campaigns against previous Barisan Nasional (BN) government corruptions and abuses in the 2018 general election (GE14), as his past experience and known reputation suits the institutional reforms agenda of new ruling PH administration and the peoples' mandate as well as expectations had made himself a right choice. Eight by-elections were held under his chairmanship and he had implemented a number of reforms in the country's electoral system including online voter registration, voter's card, providing facilities for disabled and elderly voters as well as live-streaming of the vote counting process on Facebook. He served the office until his resignation on 29 June 2020.

=== Speaker of the Dewan Rakyat (2020–2022) ===
After quitting his EC position, Azhar was appointed as the Parliament Speaker on 13 July 2020, in the aftermath of the 2020 Malaysian political crisis. He was nominated by the new Prime Minister Muhyiddin Yassin of the Perikatan Nasional (PN) coalition. His controversial appointment motion was moved by Muhyiddin following an impromptu motion to unseat incumbent Mohamad Ariff. The motion was seconded by Senior Minister Mohamed Azmin Ali and narrowly succeeded through a 111–109 vote.

He had overseen the suspension of Parliament due to the proclamation of the 2021 Malaysian state of emergency from January to August which had also witnessed the enactment and revocation of Emergency Ordinance (EO), to prevent or delay any election to keep power by hiding behind the motive to curb COVID-19 pandemic has led to his failures to protect the rights of parliamentarians of the house.

The replacement of Ismail Sabri Yaakob of Barisan Nasional (BN) as the new Prime Minister of the PN government in August 2021 allowed Azhar to remain as Parliament Speaker.

== Controversies and issues ==
Azhar was accused of bias and favouring the PN - BN government on a number of occasions when the administration was facing a challenge. He has rejected a motion on 6 October 2021 proposed by Opposition Leader, Anwar Ibrahim to debate the Pandora Papers and dismissed the matter as "not urgent" despite it being widely and internationally considered a big amount of money being illegally siphoned and held offshore (outside the country) that must be investigated immediately.

On 20 July 2020, Azhar claimed that he did not order a judge to adjourn the 1Malaysia Development Berhad (1MDB) trial against former prime minister Najib Razak so that the latter can deliver a speech in parliament.

On 20 December 2021, Azhar was criticised in dismissing the demands and calls from MPs to debate the worsening December 2021 Malaysian floods crisis during the parliamentary sitting.

On 20 January 2022, Azhar was slammed again for preventing Parliament from debating the Malaysian Anti-Corruption Commission (MACC) chief Azam Baki shareholding controversy.

== Honours ==
=== Honours of Malaysia ===
- Malaysia
  - Commander of the Order of Loyalty to the Crown of Malaysia (PSM) – Tan Sri (2021)
  - Commander of the Order of Meritorious Service (PJN) – Datuk (2019)

Political offices
Preceded by Mohamad Ariff Md Yusof	Speaker of the Dewan Rakyat; 2020 - 2022	Succeeded by Johari Abdul
