= Mohamad Ariff Md Yusof =

Malaysian politician

Yang Berbahagia Tan Sri Dato' Mohamad Ariff Md Yusof PSM DSDK
- محمد عارف مد يوسف
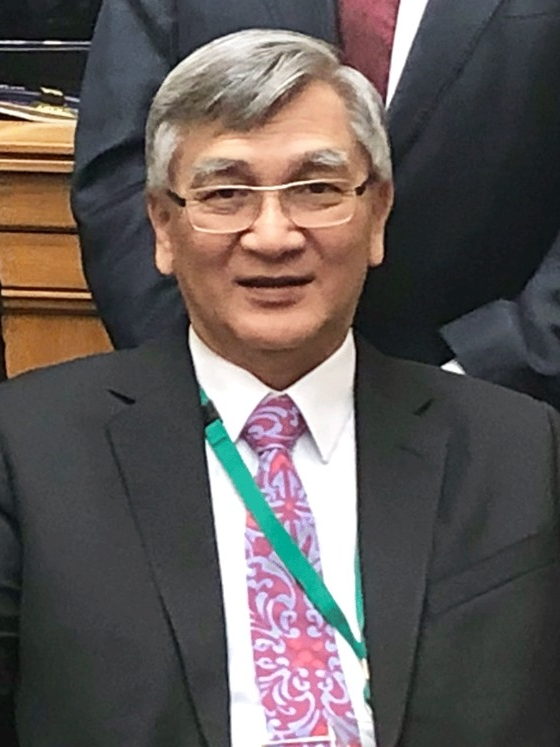
- Mohamad Ariff in 2019

9th Speaker of the Dewan Rakyat
- In office 16 July 2018 – 13 July 2020
- Monarchs: Muhammad V Abdullah
- Prime Minister: Mahathir Mohamad; Muhyiddin Yassin
- Deputy: Mohd Rashid Hasnon; Nga Kor Ming
- Preceded by: Pandikar Amin Mulia
- Succeeded by: Azhar Azizan Harun
- Constituency: Non-MP (Independent)

Personal details
- Born: Mohamad Ariff bin Md Yusof; 1949 (age 76–77) Sungai Petani, Kedah, Federation of Malaya (now Malaysia)
- Citizenship: Malaysian
- Party: National Trust Party (AMANAH) (since 2015); Malaysian Islamic Party (PAS) (–2015); Malaysian Nationalist Party (NASMA) (1985)
- Other political affiliations: Pakatan Harapan (PH) (since 2015); Pakatan Rakyat (PR) (2008–2015)
- Spouse: Hakimah Hassan
- Children: Muhamad Lutfi Mohamad Ariff (press secretary to the former Minister of Finance Lim Guan Eng)
- Education: Royal Military College
- Alma mater: London School of Economics (LLB); Lincoln's Inn

Tan Sri Dato' Mohamad Ariff bin Md Yusof (Jawi: محمد عارف بن مد يوسف; born 1949) is a Malaysian politician who served as the 9th Speaker of the Dewan Rakyat, the lower chamber of the Parliament of Malaysia from July 2018 to his removal from speakership in July 2020. He is a member of the National Trust Party (AMANAH), a component party of the Pakatan Harapan (PH) opposition coalition. He resigned from all AMANAH party positions but not membership to become more impartial after being appointed to the Dewan Rakyat speakership. Therefore, he remains an AMANAH ordinary member.

== Early life and education ==
Mohamad Ariff was born in Sungai Petani, Kedah in 1949.He received his secondary education at Ibrahim School. He graduated from the London School of Economics (LSE) with a bachelor's degree in law.

== Career ==
Mohamad Ariff joined the Faculty of Law in University of Malaya once he graduated from LSE. In 1986, he became an advocate and a solicitor at his own legal practice called Cheang & Ariff.

Mohamad Ariff joined the Securities Commission Malaysia (SC) and became the first Market Supervision Department Director from 1993 to 1995. From 1995 to 1996, he served as a Director of Kuala Lumpur Options and Super Exchange (KLOSE). He served as a member of the advisory board of Company's Commission of Malaysia from 2007 to 2008. He also was a member of the Rating Review Committee and Malaysian Rating Agency until 2008.

Mohamad Ariff was appointed a Judicial Commissioner for the High Court of Malaya in 2008. He was made a full judge of the same in 2009. In 2012, he was elevated to the Court of Appeal. He retired from the Malaysian Judiciary in 2015 and returned to his prior legal practice, Cheang & Ariff.

Mohamad Ariff was a high court judge during the 2009 Perak constitutional crisis. He also served as the judge removing the Home Ministry's ban on the book authored by the Sisters in Islam (SIS) entitled Muslim Women and the Challenges of Islamic Extremism. As a Court of Appeal Judge, he led a panel of judges in the case of Teoh Beng Hock, a man killed while in the custody of the Malaysian Anti-Corruption Commission (MACC).

== Politics ==
Mohamad Ariff was a member and candidate of the Malaysian Islamic Party (PAS) for Kota Damansara, Selangor in 2004 general election but failed to win. Then he joined National Trust Party (AMANAH), a component party of Pakatan Harapan (PH) coalition in 2015. He resigned all of his party posts and became an independent politician on 1 July 2018 in order to become the PH coalition's candidate for the speakership.

== Election results ==
Selangor State Legislative Assembly
Year	Constituency	Candidate	Votes	Pct	Opponent(s)	Votes	Pct	Ballots cast	Majority	Turnout
2004	N39 Kota Damansara	Mohamad Ariff Md Yusof (PAS)	4,827	27.19%	Mohd Mokhtar Ahmad Dahlan (UMNO)	12,926	72.81%	18,697	8,099	77.84%

== Honours ==
=== Honours of Malaysia ===
- Malaysia
  - Commander of the Order of Loyalty to the Crown of Malaysia (PSM) – Tan Sri (2019)
  - Recipient of the 16th Yang di-Pertuan Agong Installation Medal (2019)
- Kedah
  - Knight Companion of the Order of Loyalty to the Royal House of Kedah (DSDK) – Dato' (2012)

== See also ==
- Speaker of the Dewan Rakyat

Political offices
Preceded by Pandikar Amin Mulia	Speaker of the Dewan Rakyat; 2018-2020	Succeeded by Azhar Azizan Harun
