= Select committee (parliamentary system) =

Committee made of parliamentary members

A select committee in the Westminster system of parliamentary democracy is a committee made up of a small number of parliamentary members appointed to deal with particular areas or issues.

== Description ==
A select committee is a special subcommittee of a legislature or assembly. Select committees exist in the British Parliament, as well as in other parliaments based on the Westminster model, such as those in Australia, Canada, Malaysia, India, Sri Lanka, and New Zealand.

They are often investigative in nature, collecting data or evidence for a law or problem, and dissolve after their findings have been reported.

These are very common in government legislatures, and are used to solve special problems, hence their name.

== By country ==
=== United Kingdom ===
In the UK, select committees work in both the House of Commons and the House of Lords.

=== Australia ===
There are select committees appointed by both the Australian Senate and the Australian House of Representatives.

=== India ===
Under Rule 125 of the Rajya Sabha Rules and Procedures, any member may move as an amendment that a bill be referred to a select committee and, if the motion is carried, the bill shall be referred to such a committee. The House decides the members of such committee.

=== Malaysia ===
In Malaysia, there are special committees of the Dewan Rakyat (House of Reps) and the Dewan Negara (Senate).

=== South Africa ===
In South Africa, select committees appointed by the National Council of Provinces (the upper house) follow the work of the various national departments as well as dealing with Bills.

=== Sri Lanka ===
Parliament will appoint ad-hoc committees to inquire into and report to the House on a particular matter.

== See also ==
- Select or special committee (United States Congress)
- Special prosecutor
- Standing committee
