= Impact of the COVID-19 pandemic on politics in Malaysia =

Aspect of viral disease pandemic

The COVID-19 pandemic has impacted and affected the political system of Malaysia, causing suspensions of legislative activities and isolation of multiple politicians due to fears of spreading the virus. The onset of the pandemic coincided with a political crisis in early 2020 which continued into 2021 as the spread of COVID-19 and emergency government measures exacerbated initially unrelated political instability, culminating in the resignation of Prime Minister Muhyiddin Yassin and his cabinet in August 2021. Numerous elections have been postponed or suspended after the 2020 Sabah state election was blamed for a major outbreak in the state that led to the country's third wave. Several politicians tested positive for COVID-19 in 2020 and 2021.

== General election and government formation ==
A political crisis in Malaysia coincided with the onset of the COVID-19 pandemic in the country. The Pakatan Harapan coalition government collapsed, leading to the resignation of Prime Minister Mahathir Mohamad and eventual replacement with Muhyiddin Yassin and a new Perikatan Nasional coalition, which maintained a small majority. Prime Minister Muhyiddin blamed the 2020 Sabah state election for a substantial increase in COVID-19 cases across the state and country.

In June 2021, the rulers of Malaysia declared that there is no need to extend a state of emergency after 1 August, and parliament should be reopened as soon as possible. The emergency has led to the suspension of all federal parliament and state assembly sittings and also by-elections, among other things, therefore by-elections will need to proceed after 1 August in Sarawak (assembly), Batu Sapi (federal seat), Gerik (federal seat), Bugaya (Sabah state seat) and Melor (Kelantan state seat).

== Restriction announcements ==
A large outbreak at a Tablighi Jamaat religious event and the spread of the virus across the country were thought to have been exacerbated by the political instability, with the new Health Minister, Adham Baba criticizing his predecessor Dzulkefly Ahmad, although there was no clear government responsible at the time. Shortly after a thin government majority was established, the new government announced the nationwide Movement Control Order (MCO) to curb the spread of the virus.

Amid ongoing political instability, Yang di-Pertuan Agong warned politicians in May 2020 that he "would like to advise against dragging the country once again into a political mess that brings uncertainties" given the ongoing health crisis in the country. In January 2021, a State of Emergency was declared, suspending all elections and parliament, and the government were empowered to pass laws without oversight in response to the pandemic and ongoing political instability. This led to the resignation of MP Ahmad Jazlan Yaakub from the party, resulting in the loss of the government's required majority of at least 111 MPs in the Dewan Rakyat. Opposition leader Anwar Ibrahim criticised the declaration, saying this was an effort for the government to maintain power and that 115 other MPs were against it.

== Instances of isolation and testing ==
On 17 March 2020, Kelvin Yii Lee Wuen (Bandar Kuching member of parliament) tested positive for COVID-19 and was quarantined at Sarawak General Hospital. He was suspected of having been infected with the virus after meeting Sarikei MP Wong Ling Biu who also tested positive for the virus. He was announced to have recovered on 23 March 2020. Another MP which is Chong Chieng Jen (Stampin member of parliament) tested negative.

== List of assemblymen who tested positive for COVID-19 ==
=== Dewan Negara (Senators) ===
Dewan Negara

3 / 70

State/Appointed	Member	Party	Confirmed Date
Appointed	Ahmad Masrizal Muhammad	UMNO	3 October 2020
Appointed	Idris Ahmad	PAS	16 January 2021
Appointed	Zulkifli Mohamad Al-Bakri	IND	5 October 2020

=== Dewan Rakyat (Members of Parliament) ===
Dewan Rakyat

17 / 222

State	No.	Parliament Constituency	Member	Party	Confirmed Date
Perlis	P001	Padang Besar	Zahidi Zainul Abidin	UMNO	13 January 2021
Kelantan	P030	Jeli	Mustapa Mohamed	BERSATU	10 January 2021
Kelantan	P032	Gua Musang	Tengku Razaleigh Hamzah	UMNO	14 January 2021
Penang	P047	Nibong Tebal	Mansor Othman	BERSATU	25 July 2021
Perak	P056	Larut	Hamzah Zainudin	BERSATU	12 January 2021
Perak	P061	Padang Rengas	Mohamed Nazri Abdul Aziz	UMNO	18 January 2021
Perak	P073	Pasir Salak	Tajuddin Abdul Rahman	UMNO	20 January 2021
Perak	P075	Bagan Datuk	Ahmad Zahid Hamidi	UMNO	25 July 2021
Pahang	P082	Indera Mahkota	Saifuddin Abdullah	BERSATU	28 April 2021
Kuala Lumpur	P119	Titiwangsa	Rina Mohd. Harun	BERSATU	11 January 2021
Johor	P156	Kota Tinggi	Halimah Mohd. Sadique	UMNO	19 January 2021
Sabah	P180	Keningau	Jeffrey Gapari Kitingan	STAR	4 January 2021
Sarawak	P194	Petra Jaya	Fadillah Yusof	PBB	11 June 2021
Sarawak	P197	Kota Samarahan	Rubiah Wang	PBB	4 April 2020
Sarawak	P195	Bandar Kuching	Kelvin Yii Lee Wuen	DAP	17 March 2020
Sarawak	P208	Sarikei	Wong Ling Biu	DAP	17 March 2020
Sarawak	P211	Lanang	Alice Lau Kiong Yieng	DAP	27 May 2021
Total	Perlis (1), Kelantan (2), Perak (3), Pahang (1), F.T. Kuala Lumpur (1), Johor (1), Sabah (1), Sarawak (5)				

=== Dewan Undangan Negeri (Malaysian State Assembly Representatives) ===
State legislative assemblies of Malaysia
25 / 600 Selangor State Legislative Assembly
5 / 56
Sabah State Legislative Assembly
5 / 79
Johor State Legislative Assembly
4 / 56
Kelantan State Legislative Assembly
3 / 45
Pahang State Legislative Assembly
2 / 42
Perlis State Legislative Assembly
1 / 15
Malacca State Legislative Assembly
1 / 28
Terengganu State Legislative Assembly
1 / 33
Kedah State Legislative Assembly
1 / 36
Negeri Sembilan State Legislative Assembly
1 / 36
Sarawak State Legislative Assembly
1 / 82

State	No.	Parliamentary Constituency	No.	State Assembly Constituency	Member	Party
Perlis	P02	Kangar	N8	Indera Kayangan	Gan Ay Ling	PKR
Kedah	P17	Padang Serai	N34	Lunas	Azman Nasruddin	BERSATU
Kelantan	P30	Jeli	N37	Air Lanas	Mustapa Mohamed	BERSATU
Kelantan	P32	Gua Musang	N43	Nenggiri	Ab. Aziz Yusoff	UMNO
Kelantan	P32	Gua Musang	N45	Galas	Mohd. Syahbuddin Hashim	UMNO
Terengganu	P40	Kemaman	N30	Kijal	Ahmad Said	UMNO
Pahang	P81	Jerantut	N9	Tahan	Mohd Zakhwan Ahmad Badarddin	PAS
Pahang	P89	Bentong	N35	Sabai	Kamache Doray Rajoo	DAP
Selangor	P97	Selayang	N14	Rawang	Chua Wei Kiat	PKR
Selangor	P105	Petaling Jaya	N33	Taman Medan	Syamsul Firdaus Mohamed Supri	PKR
Selangor	P106	Damansara	N35	Kampung Tunku	Lim Yi Wei	DAP
Selangor	P107	Sungai Buloh	N39	Kota Damansara	Shatiri Mansor	PKR
Selangor	P113	Sepang	N55	Dengkil	Adhif Syan Abdullah	BERSATU
Negeri Sembilan	P132	Port Dickson	N33	Sri Tanjong	Ravi Munasamy	PKR
Malacca	P134	Masjid Tanah	N3	Ayer Limau	Amiruddin Yusop	UMNO
Johor	P142	Labis	N5	Tenang	Mohd. Solihan Badri	BERSATU
Johor	P146	Muar	N15	Maharani	Nor Hayati Bachok	AMANAH
Johor	P149	Sri Gading	N21	Parit Yaani	Amunolhuda Hassan	AMANAH
Johor	P153	Sembrong	N30	Paloh	Sheikh Umar Bagharib Ali	DAP
Sabah	P168	Kota Marudu	N07	Tandek	Hendrus Anding	PBS
Sabah	P170	Tuaran	N12	Sulaman	Hajiji Mohd Nor	BERSATU
Sabah	P180	Keningau	N39	Tambunan	Jeffrey Kitingan	STAR
Sabah	P180	Keningau	N40	Bingkor	Robert Tawik	STAR
Sabah	P188	Lahad Datu	N63	Kunak	Norazlinah Arif	WARISAN
Sarawak	P198	Puncak Borneo	N19	Mambong	Jerip Susil	PBB
Total			Perlis (1), Kedah (1), Kelantan (3), Terengganu (1), Pahang (2), Selangor (5), Negeri Sembilan (1), Malacca (1), Johor (4), Sabah (5), Sarawak (1)			

== See also ==
- 2020–21 Malaysian political crisis
- 2021 Malaysian state of emergency
- Issues related to the COVID-19 pandemic in Malaysia
- Social impact of the COVID-19 pandemic in Malaysia
- Political impact of the COVID-19 pandemic
