= Abdullah Ya'kub =

Malaysian politician

Yang Berbahagia Dato' Abdullah Ya'kub DJMK
- عبدﷲ يعقوب

Speaker of the Kelantan State Legislative Assembly
- In office 13 June 2013 – 5 September 2023
- Monarch: Muhammad V
- Menteri Besar: Ahmad Yakob
- Deputy: Abdul Latiff Abdul Rahman (2013–2018); Abdul Fattah Mahmood (2018–2023)
- Preceded by: Mohd Nassuruddin Daud
- Succeeded by: Mohd Amar Abdullah
- Constituency: Non-MLA

Member of the Kelantan State Executive Council
- 1997–1999: Chairman of the Culture, Tourism, Youth and Sports
- 1999–2004: Chairman of the Public Works and Public Amenities
- 2010–2013: Deputy Chairman of the Local Government, Tourism and Culture

Faction represented in the Kelantan State Legislative Assembly
- 1995–2004: Malaysian Islamic Party
- 2008–2013: Malaysian Islamic Party

Personal details
- Born: Abdullah bin Ya'kub Kelantan, Malaysia
- Citizenship: Malaysia
- Party: Malaysian Islamic Party (PAS)
- Other political affiliations: Angkatan Perpaduan Ummah (APU) (1990–1996); Barisan Alternatif (BA) (1998–2004); Pakatan Rakyat (PR) (2008–2015); Gagasan Sejahtera (GS) (2016–2020); Perikatan Nasional (PN) (since 2020)
- Occupation: Politician

Abdullah bin Ya'kub is a Malaysian politician who served as the Speaker of the Kelantan State Legislative Assembly from June 2013 to September 2023. He is a member of the Malaysian Islamic Party (PAS), a component party of the Perikatan Nasional (PN) coalition.

== Election results ==
Kelantan State Legislative Assembly
Year	Constituency	Candidate	Votes	Pct	Opponent(s)	Votes	Pct	Ballots cast	Majority	Turnout
1995	N36 Air Lanas	Abdullah Ya'kub (PAS)	4,540	52.36%	Mustafa Musa (UMNO)	4,131	47.64%	8,884	409	79.42%
1999	N36 Air Lanas	Abdullah Ya'kub (PAS)	5,634	55.58%	Zianon Abdin Ali (UMNO)	4,502	44.42%	10,401	1,132	79.59%
2004	N37 Air Lanas	Abdullah Ya'kub (PAS)	4,319	45.77%	Mustapa Mohamed (UMNO)	5,118	54.23%	9,522	799	83.92%
2008	N37 Air Lanas	Abdullah Ya'kub (PAS)	5,690	53.76%	Azmi Setapa (UMNO)	4,895	46.24%	10,759	795	85.34%
2013	N37 Air Lanas	Abdullah Ya'kub (PAS)	6,558	49.82%	Mustapa Mohamed (UMNO)	6,605	50.18%	13,365	47	89.10%
2018	N37 Air Lanas	Abdullah Ya'kub (PAS)	6,884	46.72%	Mustapa Mohamed (UMNO)	7,243	49.16%	15,030	359	84.86%
2018	N37 Air Lanas	Abdullah Ya'kub (PAS)	6,884	46.72%	Aminuddin Yaacob (BERSATU)	608	4.12%	15,030	359	84.86%

== Honours ==
- Kelantan
  - Knight Commander of the Order of the Life of the Crown of Kelantan (DJMK) – Dato' (2013)
