= Budget Select Committee (Malaysia) =

Committee appointed by the Malaysian House of Representatives

The Budget Select Committee (Malay: Jawatankuasa Pilihan Khas Bajet; Chinese: 馬來西亞預算專責委員會; Tamil: மலேசியாவின் பட்ஜெட் சிறப்பு தேர்வுக் குழு) is a select committee of the Malaysian House of Representatives, which scrutinises the Malaysian federal budget. It is among six new bipartisan parliamentary select committees announced by Speaker of the House of Representatives, Mohamad Ariff Md Yusof, on 4 December 2018 in an effort to improve the institutional system.

== Membership ==
=== 14th Parliament ===
As of December 2019, the Committee's current members are as follows:

Member	Party	Constituency
Mustapa Mohamed MP (Chairman)	BERSATU	Jeli
Noor Amin Ahmad MP	PKR	Kangar
Kee Chin Cha MP	DAP	Rasah
Khairy Jamaluddin MP	UMNO	Rembau
Alexander Nanta Linggi MP	PBB	Kapit
Yee Kew Tan MP	PKR	Wangsa Maju
Kelvin Lee Wuen Yii MP	DAP	Bandar Kuching

Former members of the committee are as follows:

Member	Party	Constituency	Successor
Nik Nazmi Nik Ahmad MP	PKR	Setiawangsa	Noor Amin Ahmad
Poay Tiong Khoo MP	DAP	Kota Melaka	Cha Kee Chin

== Chair of the Budget Select Committee ==
Chair	Party	Constituency	First elected	Method
Mustapa Mohamed	BERSATU	Jeli	4 December 2018	Elected by the Speaker of the House of Representatives

== See also ==
- Parliamentary Committees of Malaysia
