= Zahari Kechik =

Malaysian politician

Yang Berhormat Tuan Zahari Kechik MP
- ظهري كچيق

Member of the Malaysian Parliament for Jeli
- Incumbent
- Assumed office 19 November 2022
- Preceded by: Mustapa Mohamed (BN–UMNO)
- Majority: 12,464 (2022)

Faction represented in Dewan Rakyat
- 2022–2024: Perikatan Nasional
- 2024–: Independent

Personal details
- Born: Zahari bin Kechik; 1961 (age 64–65)
- Party: United Malay National Organisation (UMNO) (until 2022); Malaysian United Indigenous Party (BERSATU) (2022–2024)
- Other political affiliations: Barisan Nasional (BN) (until 2022); Perikatan Nasional (PN) (2022–2024)
- Spouse(s): Hayati Ismail; Che Maziah Mustafa
- Relations: Mohd Adhan Kechik (elder brother)
- Education: Universiti Teknologi MARA

Zahari bin Kechik (born 1961) is a Malaysian politician who has served as the Member of Parliament (MP) for Jeli since November 2022. He was a member of the Malaysian United Indigenous Party (BERSATU), a component party of the Perikatan Nasional (PN) coalition. Currently, he is an independent politician since his BERSATU membership ended on 12 June 2024.

== Political career ==
Zahari Kechik had served as Political Secreatary to the Minister in Prime Minister's Department (Economy).

=== Support for Prime Minister Anwar Ibrahim ===
On 8 November 2023, Zahari declared his support for the government and leadership of Prime Minister Anwar Ibrahim. His support for Anwar and his government strengthened the two-thirds majority support in the Dewan Rakyat they commanded by increasing the MPs supporting his government from 150 to 151. He is the fourth opposition MP to do so after Kuala Kangsar MP Iskandar Dzulkarnain Abdul Khalid, Labuan MP Suhaili Abdul Rahman and Gua Musang MP Mohd Azizi Abu Naim. They were later joined by the Bukit Gantang and Tanjong Karang MPs, Syed Abu Hussin and Dr. Zulkafperi Hanapi.

== Election results ==
Parliament of Malaysia
Year	Constituency	Candidate	Votes	Pct	Opponent(s)	Votes	Pct	Ballots cast	Majority	Turnout
2022	P030 Jeli	Zahari Kechik (BERSATU)	27,072	63.03%	Norwahida Patuan (UMNO)	14,608	34.01%	43,588	12,464	72.85%
2022	P030 Jeli	Zahari Kechik (BERSATU)	27,072	63.03%	Md Radzi Wahab (AMANAH)	1,140	2.65%	43,588	12,464	72.85%
2022	P030 Jeli	Zahari Kechik (BERSATU)	27,072	63.03%	Muhammad Daud (PUTRA)	133	0.31%	43,588	12,464	72.85%

== Honours ==
=== Honours of Malaysia ===
- Malaysia
  - Recipient of the 17th Yang di-Pertuan Agong Installation Medal (2024)

== See also ==
- Members of the Dewan Rakyat, 15th Malaysian Parliament
