= Mohd Apandi Mohamad =

Malaysian politician

Yang Berbahagia Dato' Sr. Haji Mohd Apandi Mohamad DJMK
- محمد أڤندي محمد

Senator Elected by the Kelantan State Legislative Assembly
- In office 8 July 2020 – 7 July 2023 Serving with Asmak Husin (2020–2021); Wan Martina (2021–2023)
- Monarch: Abdullah
- Prime Minister: Muhyiddin Yassin (2020–2021); Ismail Sabri Yaakob (2021–2022); Anwar Ibrahim (2022–2023)
- Preceded by: Muhamad Mustafa
- Succeeded by: Nik Mohamad Abduh

Member of the Malaysian Parliament for Jeli
- In office 29 November 1999 – 21 March 2004
- Preceded by: Mustapa Mohamed (BN–UMNO)
- Succeeded by: Mustapa Mohamed (BN-UMNO)
- Majority: 693 (1999)

Faction represented in Dewan Negara
- 2020–2023: Perikatan Nasional

Faction represented in Dewan Rakyat
- 1999–2004: Malaysian Islamic Party

Personal details
- Born: Mohd Apandi Mohamad; 1958 (age 67–68) Kelantan, Malaysia
- Citizenship: Malaysia
- Party: Malaysian Islamic Party
- Other political affiliations: Barisan Alternatif; Pakatan Rakyat; Gagasan Sejahtera; Perikatan Nasional
- Education: National University of Malaysia
- Occupation: Politician
- Profession: Surveyor

Dato' Sr. Haji Mohd Apandi bin Mohamad is a Malaysian politician who had served as Senator from 2020 to 2023 and Member of Parliament (MP) for Jeli from 1999 to 2004. He is a member of the Malaysian Islamic Party (PAS), a component party of the Perikatan Nasional (PN) coalition.

== Election results ==
Parliament of Malaysia
Year	Constituency	Candidate	Votes	Pct	Opponent(s)	Votes	Pct	Ballots cast	Majority	Turnout
1999	P030 Jeli	Mohd Apandi Mohamad (PAS)	15,523	50.69%	Mustapa Mohamed (UMNO)	14,830	48.43%	31,152	693	81.93%
2004	P030 Jeli	Mohd Apandi Mohamad (PAS)	9,607	36.16%	Mustapa Mohamed (UMNO)	16,960	63.84%	26,961	7,353	82.38%
2008	P030 Jeli	Mohd Apandi Mohamad (PAS)	12,732	42.33%	Mustapa Mohamed (UMNO)	17,168	57.07%	30,555	4,436	84.18%
2013	P030 Jeli	Mohd Apandi Mohamad (PAS)	15,954	42.81%	Mustapa Mohamed (UMNO)	21,223	56.95%	37,688	5,269	87.19%

Kelantan State Legislative Assembly
Year	Constituency	Candidate	Votes	Pct	Opponent(s)	Votes	Pct	Ballots cast	Majority	Turnout
2018	N38 Kuala Balah	Mohd Apandi Mohamad (PAS)	4,714	45.74%	Abdul Aziz Derashid (UMNO)	5,592	54.26%	10,550	878	85.03%

== Honours ==
- Kelantan
  - Knight Commander of the Order of the Life of the Crown of Kelantan (DJMK) – Dato' (2023)
  - Companion of the Order of the Life of the Crown of Kelantan (JMK)

== See also ==
- Members of the Dewan Negara, 14th Malaysian Parliament
- List of people who have served in both Houses of the Malaysian Parliament
