= COVID-19 pandemic in Malaysia =

- Disease: COVID-19
- Pathogen: SARS-CoV-2
- Location: Malaysia
- First outbreak: Wuhan, Hubei, China
- Index case: Iskandar Puteri, Johor
- Arrival date: 25 January 2020 (6 years, 9 months, 3 weeks and 3 days ago)
- Date: As of 27 June 2023
- Confirmed cases: 5,329,836
- Active cases: 27,008
- Recovered: 4,920,616
- Deaths: 37,351
- Fatality rate: 0.7%
- Vaccinations: 28,138,564 (total vaccinated); 27,551,144 (fully vaccinated); 72,657,256 (doses administered)

Government website
- covid-19.moh.gov.my covidnow.moh.gov.my data.moh.gov.my/covid

The COVID-19 pandemic in Malaysia was a part of the worldwide pandemic of coronavirus disease 2019 (COVID-19) caused by severe acute respiratory syndrome coronavirus 2 (SARS-CoV-2). As of 10 February 2023, with over 5 million confirmed COVID-19 cases, a high of approximately 323,000 active cases, nearly 40,000 deaths, and over 66 million tests, the country was ranked third in the number of COVID-19 cases in Southeast Asia behind Vietnam and Indonesia, and fourth in the number of COVID-19 deaths in Southeast Asia behind Indonesia, the Philippines, and Vietnam.

Since January 2020, the medical response and preparedness for the outbreak in Malaysia were overseen by the Director-General of Health Noor Hisham Abdullah under the Health Ministry of four successive governments led by the Mahathir, Muhyiddin, Ismail Sabri, and Anwar Ibrahim cabinets. The first cases in Malaysia were confirmed among travellers from China in Johor via Singapore on 25 January 2020, and continued to be limited to a few imported cases until March 2020, when several local clusters emerged. The most notable was a Tablighi Jamaat religious gathering in Sri Petaling, Kuala Lumpur, that sparked a massive spike in local cases and imported cases to neighbouring countries. By the end of March, the total number of cases had risen from below 30 to over 2,000 active cases across every state and federal territory in the country.

In response to the surge of cases in March 2020, the Malaysian government, led by Prime Minister Muhyiddin Yassin, imposed a nationwide lockdown known as the Movement Control Order (MCO), which came into effect on 18 March 2020. The MCO, which was supposed to end on 31 March 2020, was extended to early May 2020. By early May, the MCO had led to a gradual decline in daily infections. The government progressively relaxed lockdown restrictions in a staggered phase, beginning with the "Conditional Movement Control Order" (CMCO) on 4 May 2020, which allowed most business sectors to be reopened under strict standard operating procedures (SOPs), followed by the "Recovery Movement Control Order" (RMCO) on 10 June 2020. The government planned to end the RMCO on 31 August 2020, but due to the continuous detection of imported cases, measures were extended until the end of the year, with several sectors remaining closed and strict travel restrictions from several countries remaining in place.

The third wave of COVID-19 infections in the country occurred as a result of the Sabah state election in September 2020 and several outbreaks at Top Glove facilities in late 2020. The Malaysian government responded by restoring CMCO restrictions in most states from November 2020 to counter the outbreak. By mid-January 2021, the pressure of COVID-19 on the country's healthcare system led to the reintroduction of MCO restrictions across various Malaysian states and federal territories, which were extended to March 4, 2021. A nationwide state of emergency was also declared on 12 January 2021 by the Yang di-Pertuan Agong, suspending Parliament and state legislative assemblies and granting the Muhyiddin government emergency powers until 1 August 2021.

Due to a decline in new cases by early March 2021, the government lifted MCO restrictions in all states and federal territories. However, the restrictions were reinstated in several states in mid-April as infection cases rose again. With novel SARS-CoV-2 variants detected in Malaysia and a record surge in daily COVID-19 cases and deaths, the government reintroduced a nationwide MCO once more from 12 May 2021. The MCO was strengthened into a "total lockdown" from 1 June that was extended indefinitely, as the severe and continued spread of the Delta variant led to Malaysia's healthcare system capacity being reached in some regions.

Following high vaccination rates in the adult population against COVID-19 and a decrease in the number of severe cases of the disease since September 2021, Malaysia announced its intention to transition to treating COVID-19 as an endemic disease by the end of October 2021, with more generalised restrictions being eased. A fifth wave fueled by the Omicron variant led to record daily cases in February and March 2022, but was marked by lower numbers of hospitalizations and deaths than during the spread of the Delta variant. As of March 2022, the BA.2 Omicron subvariant was projected to be the dominant strain in the country.

The pandemic had a severe economic impact, devalued Malaysia's currency, and shrunk its GDP, and had far-reaching effects on Malaysian society. The onset of the pandemic in early 2020 coincided with an initially unrelated political crisis that hampered the government's early response, and the repeated COVID-19 waves and emergency measures exacerbated ongoing political instability throughout 2020 and 2021. This led to Muhyiddin's resignation following the collapse of his government and the appointment of a successor government under Ismail Sabri Yaakob in August 2021.

The country's vaccination programme, which commenced in late February 2021, fully inoculated over 80% of the population and 97% of adults as of 24 April 2022.

== Nomenclature ==
The Ministry of Health originally referred to this disease as the "2019 Novel Coronavirus". Some media referred to this disease as the "Wuhan Coronavirus". During the onset of the outbreak, the Malaysian media called it "radang paru-paru Wuhan" in Malay, meaning "Wuhan Pneumonia". Then some media changed the name to "radang paru-paru koronavirus baru" (new coronavirus pneumonia) in Malay. The Ministry of Health and most media then referred to the disease as "COVID-19", as suggested by the World Health Organization (WHO) on 11 February 2020.

== Background ==
On 12 January 2020, the World Health Organization (WHO) confirmed that a novel coronavirus was the cause of a respiratory illness in a cluster of people in Wuhan City, Hubei Province, China, which was reported to the WHO on 31 December 2019.

Unlike the SARS outbreak of 2003, the case fatality ratio for COVID-19 was much lower, but the transmission was significantly greater, with a significant total death toll.

== Transmission timeline ==
Malaysia reported its first three cases on 25 January 2020, all of whom were Chinese nationals who had visited the country. Malaysia experienced a spike in COVID-19 cases following a four-day Tablighi Jamaat event that was held at Kuala Lumpur's "Masjid Jamek Sri Petaling" between 27 February and 1 March 2020. By 20 March, 48% of the country's COVID-19 cases (3,347) were linked to the Sri Petaling tabligh cluster. In response to the rise in cases nationally, Prime Minister Muhyiddin Yassin announced that Malaysia would enter a partial lockdown on 18 March 2020. On 17 March, Malaysia reported its first two deaths from the coronavirus: a 60-year-old priest from Emmanuel Baptist Church in Kuching, Sarawak, and a 34-year-old participant of the Sri Petaling tabligh jamaat from Johor Bahru, Johor.

On 3 April, a spike of 217 new cases was reported, bringing the total number to 3,333. The Director-General of Health Noor Hisham Abdullah attributed this spike to active detection in areas affected by the Enhanced Movement Control Order, a stricter version of the MCO. In response to rising cases, the Government extended the movement control order until 28 April.

On 1 May, Prime Minister Muhyiddin Yassin announced that the country's lockdown would be eased on 4 May, allowing most businesses to reopen while maintaining a ban on mass gatherings. From 21 May, a spike of cases occurred among detainees at immigration detention centres in Bukit Jalil and Semenyih, Selangor, causing the number of cases to rise to a total of 7,819 by 31 May.

On 20 July, Prime Minister Muhyiddin announced that the Malaysian Government would consider making face masks compulsory following the emergence of 13 clusters after the relaxation of lockdown restrictions on travel and businesses the previous month. By 31 August, there were 160 active cases with a total of 9,340 cases. A total of 9,054 had recovered, while the death toll had risen to 127.

At least two regional outbreaks occurred since July 2020. In late July and August, several clusters emerged in Kedah and Sarawak. In September 2020, a major outbreak in Sabah, initially detected in two prisons, led to a spike in community cases within that state. Following the 2020 Sabah state election, the number of cases rose across the country due to Sabah voters returning to work in other states. Malaysian authorities also attributed the surge of cases in Sabah to the entry of illegal immigrants from Indonesia. The country passed the 10,000-case mark on 16 September 2020, and 11 deaths, primarily in Kedah and Sabah, were reported between the month-ends of August and September.

Throughout December, the total number of cases climbed rapidly and reached the 100,000 mark on 24 December. On 23 December, the Malaysian Health Ministry confirmed that it had identified a new COVID-19 strain dubbed the "A701B" strain.

By 6 January 2021, the number of recovered exceeded 100,000. On the same day, the Director General reported that there were 252 active clusters in Malaysia. By 25 January 2021, Malaysia ranked 29th in a list of countries with the highest number of infections over a two-week period published by Johns Hopkins University, with 48,625 new infections during that period. On 18 February, the death toll exceeded the 1,000 mark and reached 1,005 deaths.

By 22 May, the total number of cases reached the 500,000 mark and totalled 505,115. By 2 June 2021, the total number of recoveries exceeded the 500,000 mark and reached 501,898. On 28 June, the death toll exceeded 5,000 and reached 5,001.

On 26 July, the total number of cases exceeded the one million mark and reached 1,013,438. By 5 August, the death toll reached the 10,000 mark and totalled 10,019. By 7 August, the total number of recoveries reached the 1 million mark and totalled 1,009,343.

By 11 September, the death toll exceeded 20,000 and reached 20,419. By 14 September, the total number of cases exceeded the two million mark and reached 2,011,440. By 27 September, the total number of recoveries exceeded the two million mark and reached 2,005,942. On 21 November, Malaysia's death toll exceeded the 30,000 threshold and reached 30,002.

On 13 February 2022, the total number of cases in Malaysia exceeded the 3 million mark and reached 3,040,235. By 24 February, the total number of recoveries reached the 3 million mark and totalled 3,018,172.

View source data.

== Federal government responses ==
=== Movement Control Order ===
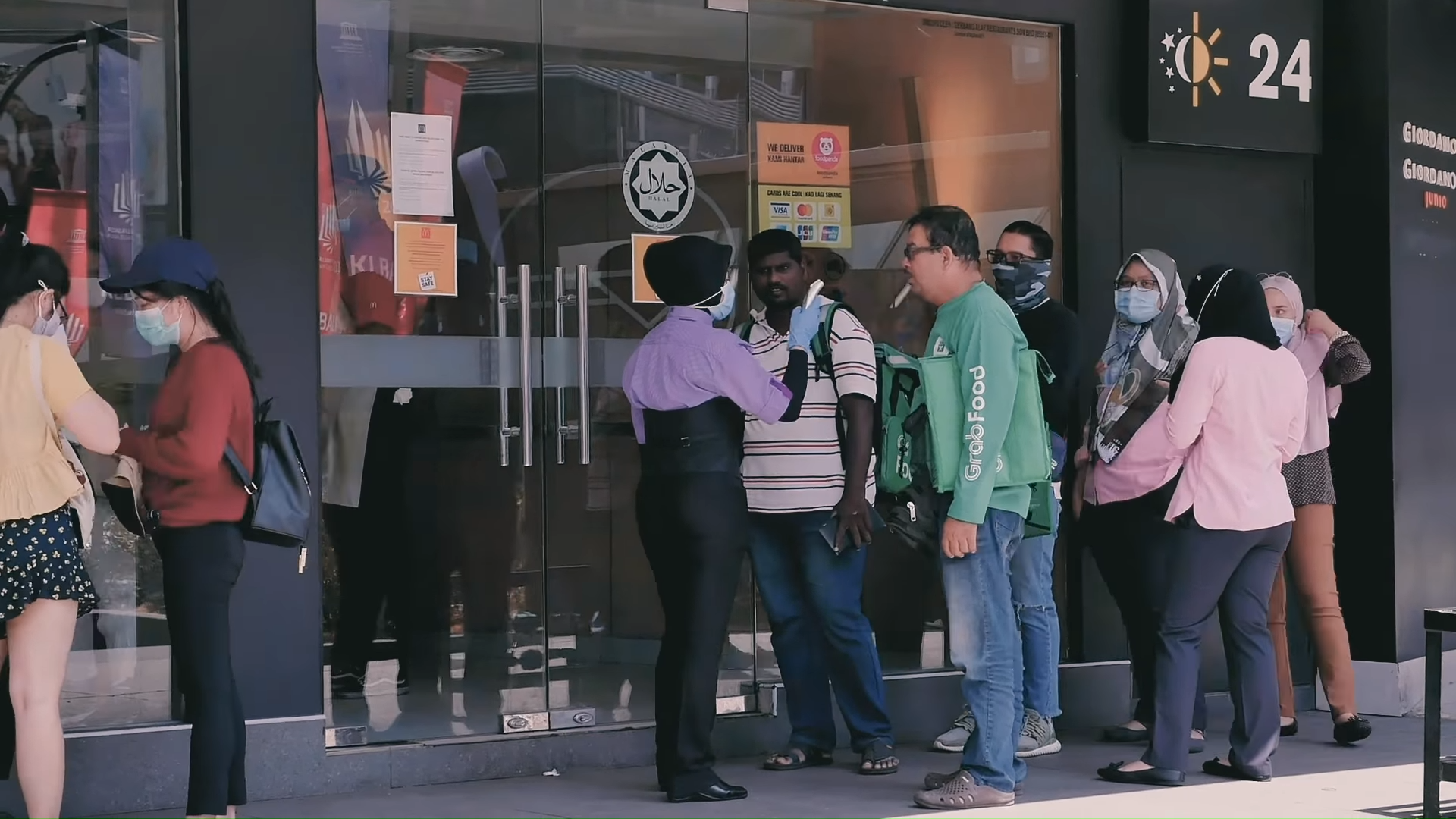
Temperature checkup at a McDonald's restaurant in the capital city of Kuala Lumpur during movement control order.

==== 2020 ====
Beginning on 15 March, Malaysia saw a significant jump in active cases. The Prime Minister of Malaysia held a live nationwide telecast on 16 March 2020 at 10:00pm (UTC+8) to announce the decision of the federal government in implementing the Movement Control Order (MCO). Based on the live address that evening, six restrictions have been imposed:

1. The public is prohibited from mass gatherings or attending massive events including religious, sports, social and cultural activities. All worshipping locations and business premises should be closed except for supermarkets, public markets, grocery stores and convenience stores that sell everyday necessities. For Muslims, all religious activities in mosques including Friday prayers are adjourned in line with the decision made on 15 March 2020 by the Special Muzakarah Committee Meeting of the National Fatwa Council (MKI).
2. Malaysians returning from abroad are required to undergo health checks and self-quarantine for 14 days.
3. Tourists and foreign visitors are restricted to enter the country.
4. Closure of all kindergartens, government and private schools, including daily schools, boarding schools, international schools, tahfiz centres and other primary, secondary and pre-university institutions.
5. Closure of all public and private higher education institutions (IPTs) and skill training institutes.
6. Closure of all government and private premises except for essential services (water, electricity, energy, telecommunications, postal, transportation, irrigation, oil, gas, fuel, lubricants, broadcasting, finance, banking, health, pharmacy, fire, prison, port, airport, safety, defence, cleaning, retail and food supply).

The order was originally to be in effect from 18 March to 31 March, but has been extended four times as additional two-week "phases" over the course of two months:

- Phase 2, announced on 25 March, extends the MCO to 14 April, as new cases continued to climb.
- Phase 3, announced on 10 April, extends the MCO to 28 April, as the number of cases was projected by the WHO to peak in mid-April.
- Phase 4, announced on 23 April, extends the MCO to 12 May. On 1 May, the Malaysian Government announced that it will be relaxing Movement Control Order restrictions from 4 May as part of its plan to gradually restart the country's economy in three different phases, with public transportation services resuming on 4 May. As part of the fourth phase of the Movement Control Order, two family members will be allowed to buy food and other daily essentials. The easing of MCO drew criticisms from politicians and healthcare experts over concerns that it was too much too soon, and by 3 May, over 420,000 members of the public had signed a petition objecting to the conditional MCO and calling for the government to stay with the MCO.
- On 10 May, the Conditional Movement Control Order was extended until 9 June, the fourth extension since 18 March. Unlike the others, this extension is scheduled to last about a month as Phase 1 of the post-lockdown of the restrictions.
- On 6 June, the Director-General confirmed that the movement control order would remain in force since Malaysia is still being monitored under the Prevention and Control of Infections Diseases Act 1988.
- On 7 June, Prime Minister Muhyiddin Yassin announced that the Conditional Movement Control Order would end on 9 June, with the country moving into the Recovery Movement Control Order (RMCO) phase which would be implemented from 10 June until 31 August 2020.
- On 28 August, Prime Minister Muhyiddin Yassin announced that the Recovery Movement Control Order would be extended from 1 September until 31 December 2020.
- Following the third wave, on 12 October, Senior Minister (Security Cluster) Datuk Seri Ismail Sabri Yaakob announced that the government has agreed to enforce Conditional Movement Control Order (CMCO) in Selangor, Kuala Lumpur and Putrajaya effective from 12.01 am on 14 October until 27 October 2020.
- On 20 October, employees in the private and public sectors, at the management and supervisory levels, in areas under the Conditional Movement Control Order (CMCO) which are Kuala Lumpur, Putrajaya, Selangor, Labuan and Sabah had been instructed to work from home starting Thursday, 22 October.
- On 7 November, Senior Minister Ismail Sabri Yaakob announced that the Malaysian government would be reinstating its CMCO throughout peninsular Malaysia with the exception of Kelantan, Perlis, and Pahang between 9 November and 6 December 2020. In addition, CMCO measures for Sabah, Selangor, Kuala Lumpur, and Putrajaya, which were scheduled to end on 9 November, were extended until 6 December.
- Since 21 November 2020, the government gradually reimposed relaxed RMCO restrictions for most states except for some which would extend their CMCO until 14 January 2021.

==== 2021 ====
- On New Year's Day of 2021, Senior Minister Ismail Sabri Yaakob announced that the government had extended RMCO to 31 March 2021 as the daily new cases remain high.
- On 11 January, Prime Minister Muhyiddin Yassin reimposed MCO restrictions on mobility, economic activities, and public gatherings in the states of Malacca, Johor, Penang, Selangor, Sabah and the federal territories of Kuala Lumpur, Putrajaya, and Labuan between 13 and 26 January 2021 due to an ongoing surge of cases and deaths.
- On 2 February, Senior Minister Ismail Sabri Yaakob extended MCO restrictions in all states except Sarawak from 5 to 18 February 2021.
- On 16 February, Senior Minister Ismail Sabri Yaakob announced that the government would extend the MCO for Selangor, Johor, Penang and Kuala Lumpur until 4 March 2021. Meanwhile, Kedah, Perak, Negeri Sembilan, Terengganu, Kelantan, Melaka, Pahang and Sabah as well as the federal territories of Putrajaya and Labuan transitioned back into the Conditional Movement Control Order (CMCO) from 19 February 2021.
- On 5 March, Selangor, Johor, Penang and Kuala Lumpur exited the Movement Control Order lockdown and entered the Conditional Movement Control Order (CMCO).
- In early May, the Malaysian government reinstated Movement Control Order (MCO) restrictions in Johor, Kuala Lumpur, Penang, Sarawak, and Selangor in response to a spike in COVID-19 cases. Schools were closed and social and religious activities were banned. While some economic activities were allowed, eateries can only provide delivery and takeaway services.
- A nationwide MCO 3.0 lockdown will be reinstated from 12 May until 7 June. Dining in, social activities and shopping areas will be banned, although workers are allowed to go to work and come back home. Inter-district and inter-state travel are banned.
- A nationwide "total lockdown" will be imposed between 1 June until 28 June for all social and economic sectors, with only essential social and economic activities being allowed to operate during that period. It was extended indefinitely, as the severe and continued spread of the virus led to Malaysia's healthcare system capacity being reached in some regions.
- On 15 June, Prime Minister Muhyiddin Yassin introduced a four-phase National Recovery Plan (NRP) to help the country emerge from the COVID-19 pandemic and its economic fallout.

==== 2022 ====
- On 3 January 2022, Sarawak and Kelantan moved to Phase 4 according to National Recovery Plan (NRP), ending movement restrictions in Malaysia.
- On 1 April 2022, Malaysia will move to the endemic phase. All international borders will be reopened and the mask mandate removed for outdoor spaces except for crowded areas and indoor spaces.
- On 1 May 2022, people will be able to enter public premises regardless of their vaccination status, except those who have tested positive for COVID-19 or unvaccinated travellers undergoing quarantine. Malaysia will also remove pre-flight and on-arrival testing requirements for fully vaccinated travellers and those who have just recovered from COVID-19. Masks will remain mandatory for indoor activities and on public transport.

=== Emergency powers ===
On 25 October 2020, the Yang di-Pertuan Agong Sultan Abdullah of Pahang rejected Prime Minister Muhyiddin's request for him to declare a state of emergency in response to a spike in COVID-19 cases throughout Malaysia.

On 16 December, Prime Minister Muhyiddin invoked a state of emergency to stop by-elections scheduled to be held in the Bugaya constituency of Sabah and the Gerik constituency in Perak scheduled for January 2021. The Yang di-Pertuan Agong Abdullah had assented to the request to impose the states of emergency within these two electorates in response to a third wave of infections, which had risen to a total of 86,000 cases and 422 deaths by 16 December.

On 12 January 2021, King Abdullah of Pahang declared a national state of emergency until at least 1 August 2021 to curb the spread of COVID-19 and in response to a political crisis involving Prime Minister Muhyiddin's Perikatan Nasional government. Under this state of emergency, parliament and elections were suspended while the Malaysian government was empowered to introduce laws without approval.

On 26 July, the Minister in the Prime Minister's Department of Parliament and Law, Takiyuddin Hassan, announced that the emergency ordinance and its subsequent rules and guidelines had been revoked on 21 July by the federal government. However, when questioned by the opposition on whether the Yang di-Pertuan Agong's consent was given for the revocation, their calls were not answered by the government.

=== Bans on mass gathering events ===
Immediately after the spikes of the cases related to the Sri Petaling Tabligh event, Prime Minister Muhyiddin Yassin announced that religious, social and sports mass gatherings must be cancelled or postponed until 30 April 2020. However, the end date for the ban on mass gathering events are subject to revision depending on the situation of the outbreak. In addition, Registrar of Societies (RoS) bans all parties registered with RoS from organising any meeting and activities until 30 June 2020.

On 4 February 2021, Senior Minister Ismail Sabri Yaakob announced that Chinese New Year family reunion dinners would only be allowed at their residences among family members from the same household. These "standard operating procedures" were criticised by several politicians and public figures including Deputy national unity minister Ti Lian Ker and Member of Parliament Ong Kian Ming as "culturally insensitive" and unnecessary. The National Unity Ministry subsequently allowed Chinese New Year family reunions of 15 family members living within a 10 km radius that did not involve interstate or inter-district travel.

=== Disinformation ===
Some people have been arrested for allegedly spreading false information about the COVID-19 pandemic. As of May 17, 2020, police and the Malaysian Communication and Multimedia Commission (MCMC) have opened 265 investigations on COVID-19-related fake news. A total of 30 people have been charged, 11 were served with a warning notice and 18 others pleaded guilty.

On 11 March 2021, the government announced the Emergency (Essential Powers) (No.2) Ordinance 2021, which states that those who spread "fake news" "by any means, with intent to cause, or which is likely to cause fear or alarm to the public" could face a fine of RM100,000 or three years imprisonment or both.

== Medical responses ==
The medical response and preparedness for the outbreak in Malaysia are overseen by Director-General of Health Noor Hisham Abdullah under the Health Ministry of four successive governments. Preparations to stockpile equipment, detect and monitor cases, and treat COVID-19 patients were reported to have been initiated as early as 6 January 2020, following a World Health Organization (WHO) report on a late-December 2019 outbreak of "pneumonia of unknown cause" in the city of Wuhan in Hubei, China.

=== Face masks ===
On 23 July 2020, Senior Minister Ismail Sabri Yaakob announced that it will be compulsory for people to wear face masks in public spaces such as markets and public transportation from 1 August, with violators facing a RM1,000 (US$235) fine.

On 27 April 2022, the Malaysian Government confirmed that it would lift face mask requirements for outdoor settings from early May 2022.

On 7 September 2022, Health Minister Khairy Jamaluddin announced that face masks would be optional for most indoor spaces excluding health facilities such as hospitals, clinics, nursing homes and public transportation.

=== Testing and treatment centres ===
On 5 January 2020, the National Crisis Preparedness and Response Centre (CPRC) under the Ministry of Health Malaysia began operation. By early February 2020, 57 hospitals were reported to provide screening services for coronavirus, while among them, 26 government hospitals are responsible for the confirmation of coronavirus and the suspected patients. With the rapid increase of infections, a further total of 409 sites across the country have been gazetted by the federal government as quarantine zones for coronavirus patients comprising public universities, community colleges, technical institutes, former National Service (PLKN) camps, training centres, polytechnics and hotels owned by federal ministries, departments, agencies and statutory bodies. As of 2 May 2020, 5,484 beds at 40 hospitals, 3,873 beds (in addition to 2,100 beds on standby) at 26 hospital extension centres/low-risk COVID-19 centres, 422 ICU beds, and 1,059 ventilators have been allocated for COVID-19 patients.

Based on the January 29 circular from the Malaysia Ministry of Health, foreigners in Malaysia would not have to pay for COVID-19 testing or outpatient treatment at government hospitals. This announcement was reiterated by the Director-General of Health Dr Noor Hisham Abdullah on March 23, 2020, when asked to clarify a statement made by the Prime Minister that foreigners would have to pay for COVID-19 testing.

On 8 April 2020, a consortium of associated laboratories in Malaysia comprising Gribbles Pathology, Quantum Diagnostics and Clinipath Malaysia launched the country's largest COVID-19 collection and testing programme to increase testing capacity. Malaysian public universities have also been providing research and scientific capacity with 10 diagnostic laboratories at public higher learning institutions in the country nationwide have been called as part of a joint initiative by the Higher Education and Science, Technology and Innovation Ministries to help the Health Ministry in conducting coronavirus tests daily. Despite further capabilities to conduct more tests, the Health Ministry had stated that the country is yet to find its suitable rapid test kits to solve the increasing backlog of pending result cases along with the revelation that the existing supply of coronavirus reagents test kits could only last for another week which causing the Health Ministry to source from other countries including Singapore. As a response, the Federation of Chinese Associations Malaysia (Hua Zong) has called on the federal government to ensure sufficient coronavirus test kit reagents for the country especially among Malaysia's eastern states of Sabah and Sarawak which are reportedly struggling to source test kit reagents.

The Solidarity trial, launched by WHO to research and compare the safety and effectiveness of treatment protocols which included chloroquine, hydroxychloroquine, interferon-beta, lopinavir/ritonavir and remdesivir, would be conducted in nine government hospitals across the country.

On 3 July 2020, Minister of Health Adham Baba announced that both Malaysian citizens and foreign nationals travelling to Malaysia would be required to pay fees when undergoing COVID-19 tests under the Prevention and Control of Infectious Diseases (Fee for Coronavirus Diseases 2019 (COVID-19) Detection Test) Regulations 2020, which came into effect on 29 June.

On 24 December 2020, Malaysian Senior Minister Ismail Sabri Yaakob confirmed that the National Security Council would require the compulsory screening of all foreign workers from 1 January 2021 so that action can be taken against employers who refuse to have their workers tested.

By 16 May 2021, Health Director-General Noor Hisham Abdullah confirmed that intensive care unit (ICU) occupancy rates at hospitals in Kuala Lumpur, Selangor, Penang, Sarawak, Kedah, and Perak had reached 80% due to the COVID-19 pandemic. Some hospitals have used up all their ICU beds to treat COVID-19 patients. As a result, Malaysian authorities have been forced to deploy military-built hospitals and field hospitals. The Health Ministry has been forced to postpone elective surgery operations while semi-emergencies have been transferred out of COVID-19 hospitals.

By 15 July 2021, hotels were being converted into quarantine and treatment centres for low-risk COVID-19 patients due to a rapid increase in nationwide cases placing a strain on the country's hospitals. Hospitals across the country particularly the Klang Valley were also forced to turn away patients due to a shortage of intensive care unit beds and staff to adequately care for the patients. Health workers and medical professionals have reported experiencing "burnout" and compassion fatigue. The surge in cases throughout 2021 has been attributed to the government's less stringent lockdown measures and an earlier decision to allow 18 manufacturing sectors to reopen under 60% capacity, creating favourable conditions for virus outbreaks in factories and workers' dormitories.

On 26 July 2021, thousands of junior doctors working on contracts went on an ethical strike to protest against the government system of absorbing medical officers into permanent positions within the country's healthcare which were implemented in 2016 and also harsh working conditions including 36-hour shifts. The strike was organised anonymously after the junior doctors' grievances were not resolved. Striking doctors dressed in black marched out of several hospitals including Kuala Lumpur Hospital and Sungai Buloh Hospital. Director-General of Health Noor Hisham Abdullah urged doctors not to join the strike while police in KL confirmed they would investigate some of the organisers. The strike campaign amidst reports of overcrowding and unsanitary conditions at quarantine centres. BBC News also reported that undertakers and funeral workers were overwhelmed with requests to bury patients, many of whom had died at home.

=== Vaccination efforts ===
Between November 2020 and January 2021, the Malaysian government entered into agreements with several governments, international organizations, and companies including the Chinese government, AstraZeneca, COVAX, Pfizer, Pharmaniaga Berhad and Duopharma to procure various COVID-19 vaccine stocks for the country. In late January 2021, a COVID-19 vaccine developed by the Chinese Academy of Medical Sciences' Institute of Medical Biology became the first COVID-19 vaccine trial in Malaysia.

In early February 2021, the Science, Technology and Innovation Minister Khairy Jamaluddin was appointed as the Coordinating Minister for the immunization program. The COVID-19 Vaccine Supply Access Guarantee Special Committee (JKJAV) was also established to facilitate the procurement of COVID-19 vaccine supplies for the country. On 11 February, the Special Committee on Ensuring Access to COVID-19 Vaccine Supply announced that COVID-19 vaccines would be distributed freely to both citizens and resident foreigners. The government also launched a twelve-month immunization program between 24 February 2021 and February 2022, with Prime Minister Muhyiddin Yassin being the first individual in Malaysia to receive the COVID-19 vaccine when it was broadcast live nationwide.

In early September 2021, Minister of International Trade and Industry Mohamed Azmin Ali announced that Malaysia would start treating the COVID-19 pandemic as an endemic disease from late October 2021 due to a high vaccination rate.

=== Anti-viral pills ===
On 2 October 2021, Health Minister Khairy Jamaluddin confirmed that the Malaysian government was negotiating with Merck & Co to procure stocks of its antiviral molnupiravir pills for treating COVID-19.

== Travel and border control policies ==
=== Travel restrictions ===
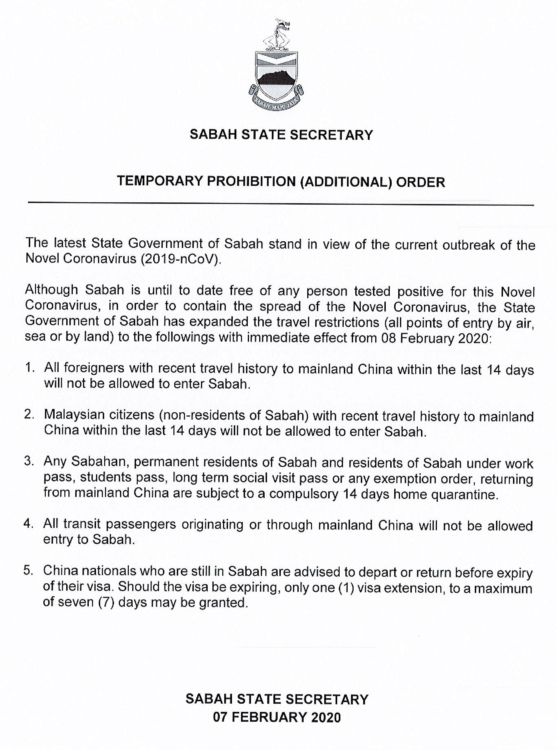
Prohibition dated 7 February 2020 in Sabah.

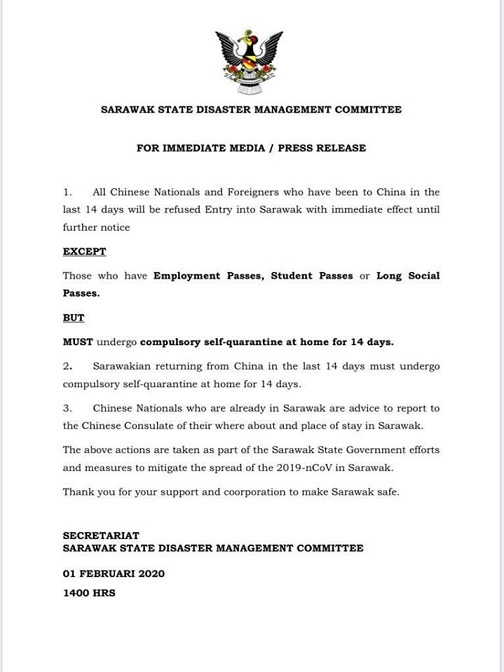
Prohibition dated 1 February 2020 in Sarawak.

Temporary Prohibition released by the State Secretary of the Government of Sabah and Sarawak Disaster Management Committee of the Government of Sarawak.

Under the Movement Control Order put in place on 18 March 2020, all citizens were prohibited from leaving the country while foreigners were also prohibited from entering the country.

Since the first wave of the virus was reported, thermal scanners were introduced at border points with the Malaysian health authorities placed on high alert. After the ban on travellers from Hubei on 27 January, the Malaysian federal government extended its ban to the Chinese provinces of Jiangsu and Zhejiang on 9 February. The state of Sabah expanded their travel restriction to all points of entry by air, sea or land starting 8 February, involving everyone except Sabahan citizens with recent travel history to mainland China within 14 days, while Sabahan citizens with such travel history must undergo a 14-day quarantine at home. The state of Sarawak closed its borders to all Chinese visitors with immediate effect on 1 February, except for people with employment passes, student passes or long-term social visit passes. However, those visitors were required to undergo self-quarantine at home for 14 days. With the increasing cases in South Korea, both Sabah and Sarawak governments began to extend their travel restrictions into the country from 1 March. On 4 March, Sarawak further added Italy and Iran into its travel restrictions list.

On 5 March, Malaysia added seven regions towards its travel restriction list, which include Lombardy, Veneto and Emilia-Romagna in Italy; Hokkaido in Japan; and Tehran, Qom and Gilan in Iran. By 10 March, Sabah also began to add Italy and Iran into its restrictions list. On 11 March, Malaysia announced a full restriction on foreign nationals directly from Italy, Iran and South Korea starting from 13 March, while Malaysians from those countries will be quarantined for 14 days. Following the 13 March Denmark lockdown, Malaysia has added the country into its travel ban list effective from 14 March.

On 6 April, visitors from the following regions can enter Malaysia by air exclusively: Angola, Burkina Faso, Burundi, Cameroon, Central African Republic, Congo, DR Congo, Ivory Coast, Djibouti, Equatorial Guinea, Eritrea, Ethiopia, Ghana, Guinea-Bissau, Liberia, Mali, Mozambique, Niger, Nigeria, Rwanda and Western Sahara.

On 16 May, the Malaysian Government announced that it would be allowing "Malaysia My Second Home" (MM2H) programme members who were stranded overseas to return to Malaysia from 17 May. However, they must undergo testing for COVID-19 in the place that they are in and must be certified free of the coronavirus in order to enter Malaysia. They will also be quarantined for 14 days.

On 1 September, Senior Minister Ismail Sabri Yaakob announced that long-term pass holders from India, Indonesia and the Philippines would be unable to enter Malaysia due to a spike of cases in those countries effective 7 September.

On 7 September, the Immigration Department banned nationals from 23 countries with a high number of COVID-19 cases including the United States, Brazil, India, Russia, Peru, Colombia, South Africa, Mexico, Spain, Argentina, Chile, Iran, Bangladesh, the United Kingdom, Saudi Arabia, Pakistan, France, Turkey, Italy, Germany, Iraq, Philippines and Indonesia. The ban includes permanent residents, participants of the "Malaysia My Second Home" program, expatriates, professional visit pass holders, the spouses of Malaysian citizens, and students.

On 10 October 2021, Prime Minister Ismail Sabri Yaakob announced that all interstate and international travel restrictions has been lifted for citizens and residents fully vaccinated against COVID-19 since 90% of its adult population had been fully vaccinated. While citizens and residents of all states and territories welcomed and enjoyed this decision, Sabah is the only state that defers the application of this decision. Sabah resumes inter-district travel on 14 October and will allow interstate and international travels on 1 November.

On 7 November, the United States Embassy in Kuala Lumpur confirmed that Malaysians travelling to the US could show their proof of vaccination on the MySejahtera app as well as a negative COVID-19 test.

On 8 November, the Malaysian and Singaporean governments reached an agreement to establish a quarantine free-travel lane for fully vaccinated travellers between Kuala Lumpur International Airport and Changi International Airport, which comes into effect on 29 November.

On 28 December, the Malaysian Government lifted its travel ban on travellers from South Africa, Zimbabwe, Mozambique and Malawi, Botswana, Eswatini, Lesotho and Namibia; stating that the Omicron variant had spread beyond Southern Africa.

On 12 January 2022, Health Minister Khairy Jamaluddin confirmed that travellers heading to Malaysia who are fully vaccinated and have previously contracted COVID-19 do not need to undergo mandatory quarantine. Travellers would have to present evidence that they had been fully vaccinated. Those who had been infected with COVID-19 had to present evidence they had been infected 11 to 60 days prior to travel to Malaysia and a "fit to travel" letter from the health facility where they were treated.

On 27 April 2022, Health Minister Khairy Jamaluddin said Malaysia will remove pre-flight and on-arrival testing requirements for fully vaccinated travellers and those who have just recovered from COVID-19 beginning on May 1. Masks would remain mandatory for indoor activities and on public transport, he said.

==== Overseas travel alert and quarantine arrangements ====
The following are warnings and quarantine arrangements for inbound and outbound travel:

Alert level	Country	Date of issue	Cancellation date	Note
Prohibit	All countries	18 March 2020	31 March 2022	With the movement control order put in place since 18 March, all citizens have been prohibited from leaving the country with foreigners also prohibited from entering the country.

=== Repatriation of Malaysian nationals abroad ===
Record Form of Repatriation for Malaysian non-main officials abroad
Departure date	Number of passengers	Departure airport	Arrival airport
4 February 2020	107	Wuhan – Tianhe	KL – International
26 February 2020	66	Wuhan – Tianhe	KL – International
21 March 2020	212	Tashkent – Islam Karimov	KL – International
22 March 2020	55 (comprising 46 Malaysians, eight Singaporeans and one Indonesian)	Tehran – Imam Khomeini	KL – International
27 March 2020	162	HCMC – Tan Son Nhat	KL – International
30 March 2020	179	Amritsar – Sri Guru Ram Dass Jee	KL – International
31 March 2020	144	Yangon – Mingaladon	KL – International
1 April 2020	121	Bangkok – Suvarnabhumi	KL – International
2 April 2020	160	Medan – Kualanamu	KL – International
11 April 2020	110	Islamabad – Fateh Jang	KL – International

The Malaysian government has made the repatriation of its citizens abroad a priority; beginning with the first repatriations from China. During the first repatriation, two persons were found to be infected with the virus and were subsequently quarantined and treated in the country until they have fully recovered.

On 21 March, a total of 212 Malaysians arrived from Uzbekistan through a flight sponsored by the Uzbekistan government which is also being used to repatriate Uzbek citizens in Malaysia. On that same day, 372 Malaysians departed Tamil Nadu on two chartered flights. On 22 March, it was reported that the Malaysian government was waiting for the Indian government's permission to organise six more flights to evacuate Malaysians still in India.

On 31 March, Deputy Foreign Minister Kamaruddin Jaffar confirmed that 4,374 Malaysians were stranded abroad due to the travel restrictions and delays created by the global coronavirus pandemic. This figure only consists of Malaysians who had bought return tickets but were unable to return due to travel restrictions. According to Kamaruddin, 2,156 Malaysians are stranded in India, 680 in Indonesia, 337 in Thailand, 226 in Australia, 153 in New Zealand, 128 in Pakistan, and 121 in Saudi Arabia.

On 5 April, Deputy Foreign Minister Kamaruddin announced that the government had brought back 4,811 stranded Malaysians from affected countries. He also upgraded the number of Malaysians stranded abroad to 2,298: 1,016 in India, 172 in Thailand, 136 in New Zealand, 128 in Pakistan, 122 in Vietnam, 83 in Saudi Arabia, 77 in Australia, 66 in the Philippines, 65 in Sri Lanka, and 43 in Nepal.

On 6 May 2021, Foreign Minister Hishamuddin Hussein confirmed that the Malaysian government would begin evacuating citizens from the northern and western regions of India via New Delhi and Mumbai in response to a surge of cases in those regions.

=== Domestic travel ===
On 7 June 2020, Prime Minister Muhyiddin Yassin announced that interstate travel would be allowed from 10 June except in areas classified under the Enhanced Movement Control Order (EMCO).

On 13 June, Senior Minister Ismail Sabri Yaakob announced that Malaysians from peninsular Malaysia, Sabah, and Labuan would be allowed to enter Sarawak without having to seek permission from the Sarawak Disaster Management Committee (SDMC) and take COVID-19 PCR tests prior to leaving for the state.

On 15 June, Health Minister Adham Baba proposed retaining a ban on interstate travel during the Eid al-Fitr period in response to rising cases that week.

In March 2021, Sabah's districts were grouped into "zones" by the state government during the recovery movement control order, and travel was possible within these zones instead of just within districts. This was in part to boost domestic tourism and was seen as successful by the government.

On 8 May 2021, Senior Minister Ismail Sabri Yaakob confirmed that all interstate and inter-district travel without police approval would be banned across the country from 10 May to 6 June 2021.

=== Overseas travel and quarantine ===
On 31 March 2020, Defence Minister Datuk Seri Ismail Sabri Yaakob announced that all Malaysians returning from overseas would have to undergo a compulsory two-week quarantine at designated quarantine centres around the country.

On 5 April 2020, the Johor Immigration Department announced that Malaysians with Singaporean work permits would be required to take swab tests in Singaporean clinics and hospitals to show that they are free of the coronavirus in order to return to Johor.

On 18 April, the United States Embassy in Kuala Lumpur advised US nationals in Malaysia wishing to return home to make commercial arrangements as soon as possible unless they had made plans to remain in Malaysia. The US Embassy also clarified that the United States Government was not planning to charter flights to evacuate its citizens.

On 27 June, Prime Minister Muhyiddin Yassin and his Singaporean counterpart Lee Hsien Loong agreed that their governments would collaborate to establish a Periodic Commuting Arrangement (PCA) allowing residents from both nations who hold long-term immigration passes for business and work purposes in the other country to periodically return to their home countries for short-term home leave.

On 14 July, Malaysian Foreign Minister Hishammuddin Hussein and Singaporean Foreign Minister Vivian Balakrishnan announced that cross-border travel and traffic between the two countries will resume on 10 August 2020 under two schemes: the Reciprocal Green Lane (RGL) and the Periodic Commuting Arrangement (PCA). The Reciprocal Green Lane will allow essential business and official travel between the two countries while the Periodic Commuting Arrangement will allow Singaporean and Malaysian residents who hold long-term immigration business and work passes to enter for work purposes.

On 23 July, Senior Minister Ismail Sabri Yaakob announced that all travellers entering Malaysia would have to undergo mandatory quarantine at hotels and quarantine centres commencing 24 July. On 30 July, Immigration Department director-general Datuk Khairul Dzaimee warned that foreigners refusing to pay the mandatory quarantine costs of RM 4,700 would have their long-term social visa passes revoked. Malaysians only have to pay half the quarantine cost.

On 13 December, the Director General of Health Noor Hisham announced that the Health Ministry has reduced the quarantine period from two weeks to 10 days for all travellers and close contacts of COVID-19-positive patients.

On 30 January 2021, the Singaporean Government announced that it would suspend its reciprocal "travel bubble" agreement with Malaysia in response to a spike of cases worldwide and the emergence of new variants.

On 23 March, the Singaporean and Malaysian Foreign Ministers Vivian Balakrishnan and Hishamuddin Hussein announced that the two governments plan to recognise each other's COVID-19 vaccine certificates with the goal of restoring cross-border travel in the near future. As of September 2021, the two governments have not yet reached to a conclusion on reopening borders. The Malaysian Foreign Minister, Saifuddin Abdullah said that Malaysia will continue negotiating with Singapore on border reopening.

From September 21 onwards, fully vaccinated travellers entering Malaysia will be able to apply for home quarantine via a new portal on the Ministry of Health's website. However, they will require to make a Pre-departure Covid PCR test and will have to apply 7–10 days before their intended travel.

On 24 September, National Recovery Council chairman Muhyiddin Yassin confirmed that Malaysia and Singapore would recognise each other's vaccination certificates to facilitate movement between the two countries.

On 24 November, the Malaysian and Singaporean governments agreed to establish a land Vaccinated Travel Lane (VTL) between the two countries from 29 November. Under the arrangement, 2,880 vaccinated Malaysian and Singaporean citizens, permanent residents, and long-term pass holders would be able to cross the Johor–Singapore Causeway each day.

On 26 November, the Government imposed temporary travel restrictions on foreign travellers from South Africa, Botswana, Eswatini, Lesotho, Mozambique, Namibia and Zimbabwe in response to the detection of a new COVID-19 variant known as the Omicron variant. Malaysian national and permanent residents will be allowed to enter Malaysia but will have to undergo 14 days of mandatory quarantine.

On 8 March 2022, Prime Minister Ismail announced that Malaysia's borders would be fully reopened to all travellers from 1 April. Fully vaccinated travellers will be allowed to enter the country without having to undergo quarantine.

== Impact ==
=== Economic impact ===
I think it's very contained right now and there's ... no cause for panic at all, but we cannot be complacent about this and we'll continue to be on serious alert.

— Malaysia Health Minister Dzulkefly Ahmad during the conversation with CNBC on the situation of the outbreak in Malaysia, 19 February 2020.

The COVID-19 pandemic had a significant impact on the Malaysian economy. By late January 2020, the Malaysian Bursa Malaysia stock market had tumbled as investors sold their stocks in response to the economic uncertainty caused by the pandemic. By February 2021, the country's gross domestic product (GDP) had shrunk 3.4% in the fourth quarter from last year. In addition, the Malaysian economy contracted 5.6% for all of 2020, its worst performance since the 1998 Asian Financial Crisis.

Numerous sectors including the entertainment, retail, hospitality, and tourism sectors were affected by various lockdown and social distancing restrictions in response to outbreaks of COVID-19 throughout 2020 and 2021. In addition, panic buying created a shortage of commodities such as surgical masks and hand sanitisers. In response, the government banned the export of facemasks and took steps to import more facemasks.

The pandemic also drew attention to workplace safety and the exploitation of migrant workers working in Malaysian industries. In response to the emergence of COVID-19 clusters among migrant workers, the Malaysian government was forced to take steps to improve their welfare and take action against "errant" employers. By 12 March 2021, 608,093 foreign workers had been screened for COVID-19, with 9,653 of them testing positive.

On 27 September 2021, Malaysia's Prime Minister Ismail Sabri Yaakob said the country's financial position was expected to improve in 2023, with the economy targeted to grow 4.5%-5.5% per year for the next five years. Malaysia posted average annual growth of 2.7% between 2016 and 2020, due in large part to a 5.6% contraction last year due to the outbreak of COVID-19.

=== Social impact ===
The COVID-19 pandemic led to social distancing restrictions on a wide range of activities including the registration of births, marriages, and deaths, religious gatherings, education, and sporting events. All sports and co-curricular activities in schools were postponed with immediate effects as announced by the country Ministry of Education. All sports and co-curricular activities in schools were postponed with immediate effects as announced by the country Ministry of Education.

Due to a decline in cases in May and June 2020, most places of worship and schools were allowed to reopen under certain health and social distancing restrictions. Following a third wave of infections that began in September 2020, most places of worship and schools closed and shifted to online services and classes.

=== Political impact ===
The COVID-19 pandemic has impacted and affected the political system of Malaysia, causing suspensions of legislative activities and isolation of multiple politicians due to fears of spreading the virus. The onset of the pandemic coincided with a political crisis in early 2020 which continued into 2021 as the spread of COVID-19 and emergency government measures exacerbated initially unrelated political instability, culminating in the resignation of Prime Minister Muhyiddin Yassin and his cabinet in August 2021. Numerous elections have been postponed or suspended after the 2020 Sabah state election was blamed for a major outbreak in the state that led to the country's third wave. Several politicians tested positive for COVID-19 in 2020 and 2021.

== Aid and relief efforts ==
The Malaysian Government along with various non-governmental organisations (NGOs), companies, and foreign governments introduced a range of relief programs to address the economic impact of the COVID-19 pandemic in Malaysia. On 23 March, the Government allocated RM600 million to the Ministry of Health for the purchase of equipment and to hire medical personnel. It also allowed contributors of the Employees Provident Fund (EPF) to withdraw up to RM500 per month for 12 months. On 27 March 2020, Prime Minister Muhyiddin Yassin introduced an economic stimulus package known as the Prihatin ("caring package") worth RM250 billion.

In addition to the federal government's efforts to provide financial relief to small traders, victims and frontline health staff, the 13 state governments launched their own stimulus packages and financial aid in the form of rental waivers and deferment of student loan repayments to help their citizens to cope throughout the virus outbreak. In addition, the Prime Minister, Deputy Prime Minister, and all other ministers and deputy ministers announced that they would contribute two months of their salaries to the COVID-19 Fund of Malaysia.

Between January and March 2020, the Sabah state government and various NGOs raised aid and medical supplies for China, which was seriously affected by the COVID-19 pandemic. Following the rise in COVID-19 cases in Malaysia, the Chinese government reciprocated Malaysia's earlier help by assisting in the distribution of aid and medical supplies in Malaysia. In addition, Malaysia received aid from the United Arab Emirates, Singapore, Taiwan, Turkey and the multinational corporation McDonald's.

Mercy Malaysia, the Malaysian Red Crescent Society along with various banks and telecommunications companies also provided customers with various forms of financial assistance and discounted services during the pandemic.

== See also ==
- COVID-19 pandemic in Asia
- Public health mitigation of COVID-19
- Treatment and management of COVID-19
- 2009 swine flu pandemic in Malaysia
- Living with COVID-19
