= Kelvin Yii =

Malaysian politician and medical doctor

Yang Berhormat Dr. Kelvin Yii Lee Wuen MP
- 俞利文
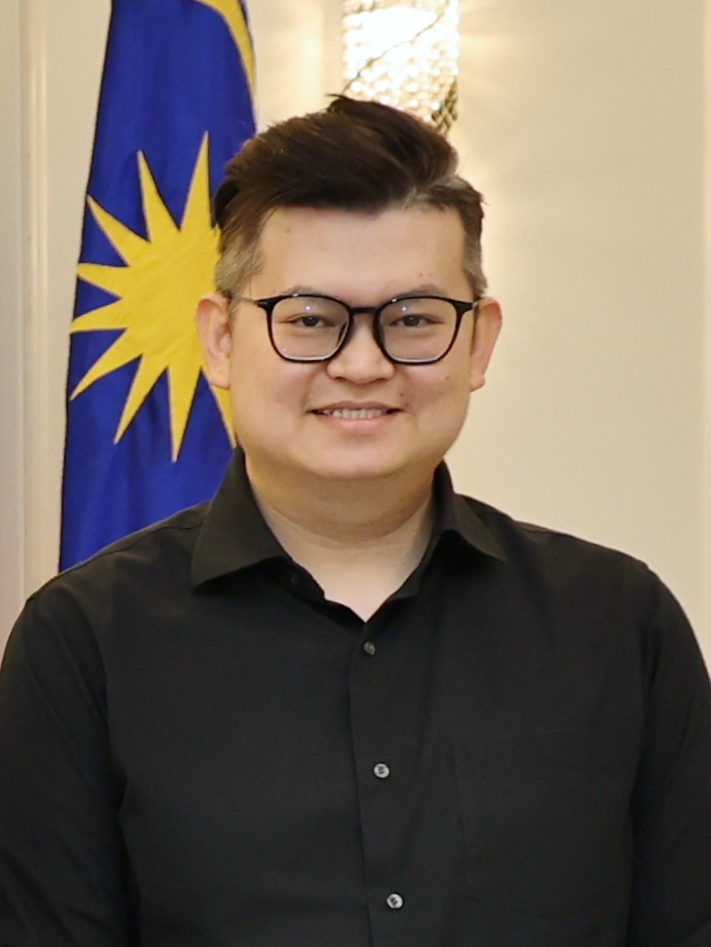
- Yii in 2024

Special Advisor to the Minister of Health
- Incumbent
- Assumed office 6 April 2023
- Monarchs: Abdullah; Ibrahim Iskandar
- Prime Minister: Anwar Ibrahim
- Minister: Zaliha Mustafa (April–December 2023); Dzulkefly Ahmad (since December 2023)
- Preceded by: Rosnah Shirlin

Member of the Malaysian Parliament for Bandar Kuching
- Incumbent
- Assumed office 9 May 2018
- Preceded by: Chong Chieng Jen (PR–DAP)
- Majority: 35,973 (2018); 28,891 (2022)

Youth Chief of the Democratic Action Party
- In office 19 March 2022 – 17 November 2024
- Deputy: Young Syefura Othman
- Secretary-General: Lim Guan Eng (2022); Anthony Loke Siew Fook (2022–2024)
- Preceded by: Howard Lee Chuan How
- Succeeded by: Woo Kah Leong

5th Youth Chief of the Pakatan Harapan
- In office 29 July 2022 – 11 March 2025
- President: Wan Azizah Wan Ismail
- Deputy: Mohd Hasbie Muda; Nurthaqaffah Nordin; Adam Adli; Felix Joseph Saang
- Chairman: Anwar Ibrahim
- Preceded by: Howard Lee Chuan How
- Succeeded by: Woo Kah Leong

Personal details
- Born: Kelvin Yii Lee Wuen; 31 August 1986 (age 40) Kuching, Sarawak, Malaysia
- Citizenship: Malaysian
- Party: Democratic Action Party (DAP)
- Other political affiliations: Pakatan Harapan (PH)
- Education: Volgograd State Medical University (MD); University of London (LLB); Northumbria University (LLM)
- Occupation: Politician
- Profession: Medical doctor

Kelvin Yii Lee Wuen (Chinese: 俞利文; pinyin: Yū Lìwén; Pe̍h-ōe-jī: Jû Lī-bûn; born 31 August 1986), is a Malaysian politician and medical doctor who has served as the special advisor to the Ministers of Health Zaliha Mustafa and Dzulkefly Ahmad since April 2023 and the Member of Parliament (MP) for Bandar Kuching since May 2018. A member of the Democratic Action Party (DAP), a component party of the Pakatan Harapan (PH) coalition, he has served as Chair of the Health, Science and Innovation Select Committee since January 2021 and is a member of the Budget Select Committee. He served as the 5th Youth Chief of PH from July 2022 to March 2025 and the Youth Chief or known as the Chief of the Youth Wing namely Democratic Action Party Socialist Youth (DAPSY) from March 2022 to November 2024. Yii also serves as special assistant to Chong Chieng Jen, Stampin MP, Member of the Legislative Assembly for Padungan, DAP Sarawak and Sarawak branch of PH chairman.

== Early life and education ==
Between 2006 and 2011, Yii was enrolled at the Volgograd State Medical University in Volgograd, Russia and obtained a Doctor of Medicine (MD) degree. He was also 1st vice president of the university's Malaysian Chinese Students Community committee for the 2009/10 term.

In June 2016, Yii graduated from the University of London with a Bachelor of Laws (Honours) (LL.B. (Hons)). Upon receiving his LL.B., Yii then studied for a Master of Laws (LL.M.) in medical law at Northumbria University.

In September 2020, Yii completed a two-month online certification course in Business, International Relations and the Political Economy conducted by the London School of Economics and Political Science.

== Political career ==
On 24 April 2018, Yii was announced as the candidate of DAP to contest for the Bandar Kuching federal seat as one of the three new faces fielded by the party in the 2018 Malaysian general election.

On 9 May 2018, he went on to win the seat and be elected as the new Bandar Kuching MP by a total of 48,548 votes and a majority of 35,973 votes.

On 4 November 2018, he was elected into the DAP state party committee and appointed as assistant secretary for a term from 2018 to 2020 in the 18th Sarawak DAP state convention.

On 4 December 2018, Speaker of the Dewan Rakyat Mohamad Ariff Md Yusof appointed Yii as a member of the newly formed Budget Select Committee.

On 14 January 2021, Yii was appointed as Chair of the Health, Science and Innovation Select Committee by Speaker of the Dewan Rakyat Azhar Azizan Harun.

On 18 December 2021, he contested for the Batu Kawah state seat in the 2021 Sarawak state election. He was however defeated in a landslide by State Minister of Housing and Local Government of Sarawak Sim Kui Hian by a minority of 5,393 votes.

On 16 January 2022, he was reelected as a member of the Sarawak DAP state committee in the 19th Sarawak DAP state convention for another new term from 2021 to 2023. He was appointed a new position namely Publicity Secretary, taking over from Lanang MP Alice Lau Kiong Yeng who went on to be the deputy chairperson. The assistant secretary position left vacated by him was taken over by Larry Asap.

On 19 March 2022, he was elected as the new Youth Chief of DAP, in another name, the Chief of DAP Socialist Youth (DAPSY), which is the name of the DAP youth wing in the DAPSY national elections by defeating Bandar Utama MLA Jamaliah Jamaluddin and DAPSY national secretary Eric Teh Hoong Keat by a total of 232 votes, taking over from former member of the Perak State Executive Council (EXCO) and present member of the Perak State Legislative Assembly (MLA) for Pasir Pinji Lee Chuan How. For the DAPSY deputy chief election, Ketari MLA Young Syefura Othman defeated the Batu Kitang DAP branch chairman Abdul Aziz Isa and Alice Lan Suet Ling by total of 212 votes and a majority of 43 votes to be his deputy.

== Personal life ==
On 17 March 2020, Yii tested positive for COVID-19 and was quarantined at Sarawak General Hospital. He was suspected of having been infected with the virus after meeting Sarikei MP Wong Ling Biu who was also tested positive for the virus. Former prime minister Mahathir Mohamad also went into self-quarantine after close contact with Yii.

Yii was announced to have recovered on 23 March 2020.

== Election results ==
Parliament of Malaysia
Year	Constituency	Candidate	Votes	Pct	Opponent(s)	Votes	Pct	Ballots cast	Majority	Turnout
2018	P195 Bandar Kuching	Kelvin Yii Lee Wuen (DAP)	48,548	79.43%	Kho Teck Wan (SUPP)	12,575	20.57%	61,483	35,973	75.11%
2022	P195 Bandar Kuching	Kelvin Yii Lee Wuen (DAP)	45,353	71.34%	Tay Tze Kok (SUPP)	16,462	25.89%	63,575	28,891	57.95%
2022	P195 Bandar Kuching	Kelvin Yii Lee Wuen (DAP)	45,353	71.34%	Voon Lee Shan (PBK)	1,760	2.77%	63,575	28,891	57.95%

Sarawak State Legislative Assembly
Year	Constituency	Candidate	Votes	Pct	Opponent(s)	Votes	Pct	Ballots cast	Majority	Turnout
2021	N14 Batu Kawah	Kelvin Yii Lee Wuen (DAP)	2,434	21.83%	Sim Kui Hian (SUPP)	7,827	70.20%	11,150	5,393	57.28%
2021	N14 Batu Kawah	Kelvin Yii Lee Wuen (DAP)	2,434	21.83%	Chai Keuh Khun (PBK)	756	6.78%	11,150	5,393	57.28%
2021	N14 Batu Kawah	Kelvin Yii Lee Wuen (DAP)	2,434	21.83%	Fong Pau Teck (ASPIRASI)	133	1.19%	11,150	5,393	57.28%

== Honours ==
=== Honours of Malaysia ===
- Malaysia
  - Recipient of the 17th Yang di-Pertuan Agong Installation Medal (2024)

== See also ==
- Budget Select Committee (Malaysia)
- Bandar Kuching (federal constituency)

Political offices
Preceded by Fadillah Yusof as Chairperson of Science, Innovation and Environment Select Committee	Chairperson of Health, Science and Innovation Select Committee; 13 January 2021–present	Incumbent
Parliament of Malaysia
Preceded by Chong Chieng Jen	Member of Parliament for Bandar Kuching; 9 May 2018–present	Incumbent
Party political offices
New title	Assistant Secretary of Democratic Action Party (Sarawak); 4 November 2018–present	Incumbent
