= Mustapa Mohamed =

Malaysian politician (born 1950)

Yang Berbahagia Dato' Seri Mustapa Mohamed SJMK SPMP SSAP SIMP DGSM DPMS
- مصطفى محمد
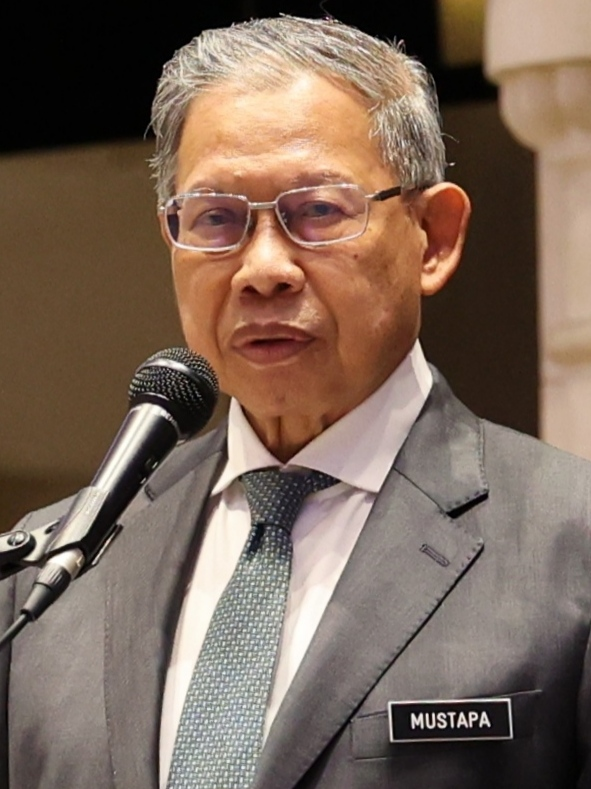
- Mustapa in 2022

Minister in the Prime Minister's Department (Economy)
- In office 30 August 2021 – 24 November 2022
- Monarch: Abdullah
- Prime Minister: Ismail Sabri Yaakob
- Deputy: Eddin Syazlee Shith
- Preceded by: Himself
- Succeeded by: Rafizi Ramli (Minister of Economy)
- Constituency: Jeli
- In office 10 March 2020 – 16 August 2021
- Monarch: Abdullah
- Prime Minister: Muhyiddin Yassin
- Deputy: Arthur Joseph Kurup
- Preceded by: Azmin Ali (Minister of Economic Affairs)
- Succeeded by: Himself
- Constituency: Jeli
- In office 27 March 2004 – 14 February 2006
- Monarch: Sirajuddin
- Prime Minister: Abdullah Ahmad Badawi
- Preceded by: Tengku Adnan Tengku Mansor
- Succeeded by: Mohd Effendi Norwawi
- Constituency: Jeli

Minister of International Trade and Industry
- In office 10 April 2009 – 9 May 2018 Serving with Ong Ka Chuan (2015–2018)
- Monarchs: Mizan Zainal Abidin; Abdul Halim; Muhammad V
- Prime Minister: Najib Razak
- Deputy: Mukhriz Mahathir (2009–2013); Jacob Dungau Sagan (2009–2013); Hamim Samuri (2013–2015); Lee Chee Leong (2014–2016); Ahmad Maslan (2015–2018); Chua Tee Yong (2016–2018)
- Preceded by: Muhyiddin Yassin
- Succeeded by: Ignatius Dorell Leiking
- Constituency: Jeli

Minister of Agriculture and Agro-based Industry
- In office 19 March 2008 – 9 April 2009
- Monarch: Mizan Zainal Abidin
- Prime Minister: Abdullah Ahmad Badawi
- Deputy: Rohani Abdul Karim
- Preceded by: Muhyiddin Yassin
- Succeeded by: Noh Omar
- Constituency: Jeli

Minister of Higher Education
- In office 14 February 2006 – 18 March 2008
- Monarchs: Sirajuddin; Mizan Zainal Abidin
- Prime Minister: Abdullah Ahmad Badawi
- Deputy: Ong Tee Keat
- Preceded by: Shafie Salleh
- Succeeded by: Mohamed Khaled Nordin
- Constituency: Jeli

Minister of Finance II
- In office 2 September 1998 – 14 December 1999 Serving with Mahathir Mohamad (1998–1999) and Daim Zainuddin (1999)
- Monarchs: Ja'afar; Salahuddin
- Prime Minister: Mahathir Mohamad
- Deputy: Wong See Wah; Mohamed Nazri Abdul Aziz
- Preceded by: Position established
- Succeeded by: Jamaluddin Jarjis
- Constituency: Jeli

Minister of Entrepreneur Development
- In office 8 May 1995 – 14 December 1999
- Monarchs: Ja'afar; Salahuddin
- Prime Minister: Mahathir Mohamad
- Deputy: Idris Jusoh
- Preceded by: Mohamed Yusof Mohamed Noor (as Minister of Public Enterprises)
- Succeeded by: Nazri Abdul Aziz
- Constituency: Jeli

Deputy Minister of Finance
- In office 1 December 1993 – 7 May 1995 Serving with Loke Yuen Yow
- Monarchs: Azlan Shah; Ja'afar
- Prime Minister: Mahathir Mohamad
- Minister: Anwar Ibrahim
- Preceded by: Abdul Ghani Othman
- Succeeded by: Affifudin Omar
- Constituency: Senator

Chair of the Budget Select Committee
- In office 4 December 2018 – 10 March 2020
- Speaker: Mohamad Ariff Md Yusof
- Preceded by: Position established
- Constituency: Jeli

Member of the Malaysian Parliament for Jeli
- In office 21 March 2004 – 19 November 2022
- Preceded by: Mohd Apandi Mohamad (PAS)
- Succeeded by: Zahari Kechik (PN–BERSATU)
- Majority: 7,353 (2004); 4,436 (2008); 5,336 (2013); 6,647 (2018)
- In office 21 April 1995 – 29 November 1999
- Preceded by: Position established
- Succeeded by: Mohd Apandi Mohamad (PAS)
- Majority: 572 (1995)

Member of the Kelantan State Legislative Assembly for Ayer Lanas
- In office 5 May 2013 – 12 August 2023
- Preceded by: Abdullah Ya'kub (PAS)
- Succeeded by: Kamarudin Md Nor (PN–BERSATU)
- Majority: 47 (2013); 359 (2018)
- In office 21 March 2004 – 8 March 2008
- Preceded by: Abdullah Ya'kub (PAS)
- Succeeded by: Abdullah Ya'kub (PAS)
- Majority: 799 (2004)

Faction represented in Dewan Rakyat
- 1995–1999: Barisan Nasional
- 2004–2018: Barisan Nasional

Personal details
- Born: Mustapa bin Mohamed; 25 September 1950 (age 76) Bachok, Kelantan, Federation of Malaya (now Malaysia)
- Citizenship: Malaysian
- Party: UMNO (1978–2018, since 2026); BERSATU (2018–2023)
- Other political affiliations: Barisan Nasional (BN) (1978–2018, since 2026); Pakatan Harapan (PH) (2018–2020); Perikatan Nasional (PN) (2020–2023)
- Spouse: Khamarzan Ahmad Meah
- Children: 4
- Education: University of Melbourne; Boston University
- Occupation: Politician
- Mustapa Mohamed on Facebook; Mustapa Mohamed on Parliament of Malaysia

Mustapa Mohamed

Faction represented in Dewan Rakyat
- 1995–1999: Barisan Nasional
- 2004–2018: Barisan Nasional
- 2018: Independent
- 2018–2020: Pakatan Harapan
- 2020: Malaysian United Indigenous Party
- 2020–2022: Perikatan Nasional

Faction represented in Dewan Negara
- 1991–1995: Barisan Nasional

Faction represented in Kelantan State Legislative Assembly
- 2004–2008: Barisan Nasional
- 2013–2018: Barisan Nasional
- 2018: Independent
- 2018–2020: Pakatan Harapan
- 2020: Malaysian United Indigenous Party
- 2020–2023: Perikatan Nasional

Mustapa bin Mohamed (Jawi: مصطفى بن محمد; born 25 September 1950), commonly known as Tok Pa among local Kelantanese, is a Malaysian former politician who served as the Minister in the Prime Minister's Department for Economic Affairs for third term in the Barisan Nasional (BN) administration under former Prime Minister Ismail Sabri Yaakob from August 2021 to the collapse of the BN administration in November 2022, second term in the Perikatan Nasional (PN) administration under former Prime Minister Muhyiddin Yassin from March 2020 to August 2021 and first term in the BN administration under former Prime Minister Abdullah Ahmad Badawi from March 2004 to February 2006 and the Member of Parliament (MP) for Jeli from March 2004 to November 2022. He was a member of the Malaysian United Indigenous Party (BERSATU), a component party of the Perikatan Nasional (PN) and formerly Pakatan Harapan (PH) coalitions and the United Malays National Organisation (UMNO), a component party of the BN coalition. He left UMNO for BERSATU in 2018, left BERSATU and retired from politics in 2023.

== Early life and education ==
Mustapa went to Sultan Ismail College, Kota Bharu and graduated from the University of Melbourne, Australia, with a First Class Honours degree in Economics and from Boston University with a Masters in Economic Development.

== Early career ==
He is an economist.

== Political career ==
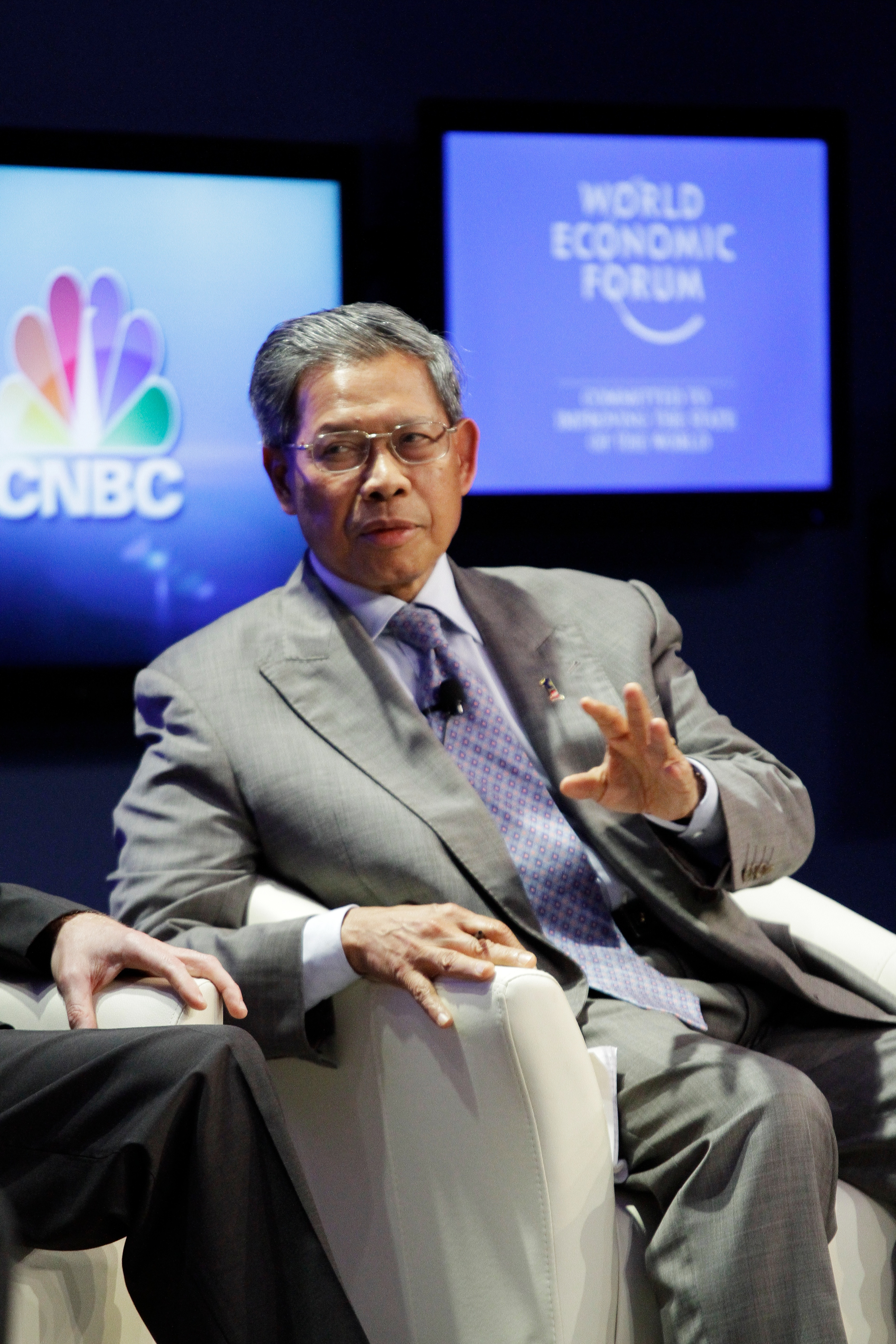
Mustapa during the World Economic Forum on East Asia in Bangkok, Thailand, May 31, 2012

Mustapa was elected to Parliament in the 1995 election for Jeli constituency, but was defeated for re-election in 1999. He won back the seat in the 2004 election. In 2004 he was also elected to the Kelantan State Legislative Assembly for the Air Lanas seat. He had been slated to become Chief Minister of Kelantan but BN failed to win a majority in the state Assembly. He was re-elected in 2008 election. In 2004 election, he retained his parliamentary seat and again won the state seat of Air Lanas concurrently but with a slim 47 votes.

Mustapa was the former Minister for International Trade and Industry in the BN federal government. Previously, he has also held a number of other government portfolios, including Deputy Finance Minister, Minister for Entrepreneur Development, Minister in the Prime Minister's Department, Minister for Higher Education, and Minister for Agriculture and Agro-based Industry. He was appointed to the Trade portfolio when Najib Razak became Prime Minister in April 2009.

In the aftermath of BN's loss in the 2018 election and UMNO's own party election, Mustapa announced on 18 September 2018 that he has quit UMNO, citing disagreements with the party's current direction. On 27 October 2018, Mustapa joined BERSATU.

On 4 December 2018, Mustapa was elected chair of the Budget Select Committee.

== Personal life ==
Mustapa is married to Khamarzan Ahmad Meah and the couple has four children.

In January 2021, Mustapa was tested positive for COVID-19. He recovered and was discharged from hospital, after being admitted for treatment for nearly two weeks including three days in the intensive care unit (ICU).

== Election results ==
Parliament of Malaysia
Year	Constituency	Candidate	Votes	Pct	Opponent(s)	Votes	Pct	Ballots cast	Majority	Turnout
1995	P030 Jeli	Mustapa Mohamed (UMNO)	13,301	51.10%	Zianon Abdin Ali (S46)	12,729	48.90%	26,962	572	81.20%
1999	P030 Jeli	Mustapa Mohamed (UMNO)	14,830	48.43%	Mohd Apandi Mohamad (PAS)	15,523	50.69%	31,152	693	81.93%
2004	P030 Jeli	Mustapa Mohamed (UMNO)	16,960	63.84%	Mohd Apandi Mohamad (PAS)	9,607	36.16%	26,961	7,353	82.38%
2008	P030 Jeli	Mustapa Mohamed (UMNO)	17,168	57.07%	Mohd Apandi Mohamad (PAS)	12,732	42.33%	30,555	4,436	84.18%
2013	P030 Jeli	Mustapa Mohamed (UMNO)	21,223	56.95%	Mohd Apandi Mohamad (PAS)	15,954	42.81%	37,688	5,269	87.19%
2018	P030 Jeli	Mustapa Mohamed (UMNO)	21,665	55.32%	Mohamad Hamid (PAS)	15,018	38.35%	39,161	6,647	82.50%
2018	P030 Jeli	Mustapa Mohamed (UMNO)	21,665	55.32%	Azran Deraman (BERSATU)	2,078	5.31%	39,161	6,647	82.50%

Kelantan State Legislative Assembly
Year	Constituency	Candidate	Votes	Pct	Opponent(s)	Votes	Pct	Ballots cast	Majority	Turnout
2004	N32 Air Lanas	Mustapa Mohamed (UMNO)	5,118	53.75%	Abdullah Ya'kub (PAS)	4,319	45.36%	9,522	799	83.92%
2013	N32 Air Lanas	Mustapa Mohamed (UMNO)	6,605	49.42%	Abdullah Ya'kub (PAS)	6,558	49.07%	13,365	47	89.10%
2018	N32 Air Lanas	Mustapa Mohamed (UMNO)	7,243	40.89%	Abdullah Ya'kub (PAS)	6,884	38.87%	14,908	359	84.19%
2018	N32 Air Lanas	Mustapa Mohamed (UMNO)	7,243	40.89%	Aminuddin Yaacob (BERSATU)	608	3.43%	14,908	359	84.19%

== Honours ==
=== Honours of Malaysia ===
- Kelantan
  - Knight Grand Commander of the Order of the Life of the Crown of Kelantan (SJMK) – Dato' (2000)
- Malacca
  - Grand Commander of the Exalted Order of Malacca (DGSM) – Datuk Seri (2015)
- Pahang
  - Knight Grand Companion of the Order of Sultan Ahmad Shah of Pahang (SSAP) – Dato' Sri (2008)
  - Knight Grand Companion of the Order of the Crown of Pahang (SIMP) – formerly Dato', now Dato' Indera (1998)
- Perlis
  - Knight Grand Commander of the Order of the Crown of Perlis (SPMP) – Dato' Seri (2014)
- Selangor
  - Knight Commander of the Order of the Crown of Selangor (DPMS) – Dato' (1994)

=== Foreign honours ===
- Japan
  - Grand Cordon of the Order of the Rising Sun (2024)

== See also ==
- Budget Select Committee (Malaysia)
- Jeli (federal constituency)
- Air Lanas (state constituency)
