= Jeli (federal constituency) =

Federal constituency of Kelantan, Malaysia

Jeli (P030)
Kelantan constituency
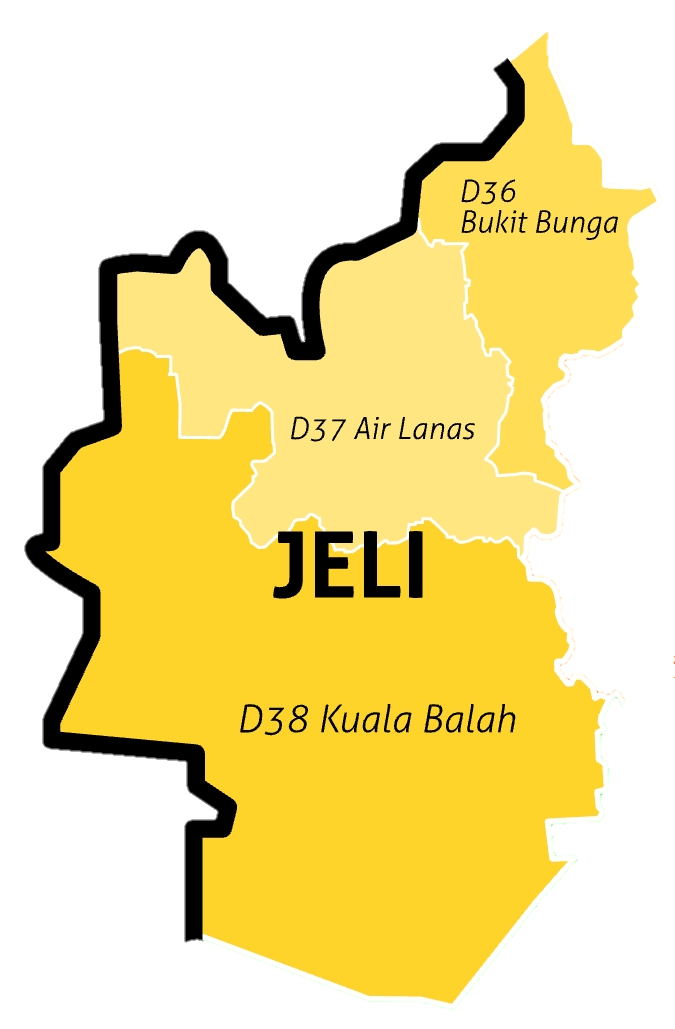

Federal constituency
- Legislature: Dewan Rakyat
- MP: Zahari Kechik; Independent
- Constituency created: 1994
- First contested: 1995
- Last contested: 2022

Demographics
- Population (2020): 78,592
- Electors (2023): 59,894
- Area (km²): 1,500
- Pop. density (per km²): 52.4

Jeli is a federal constituency in Jeli District and Tanah Merah District, Kelantan, Malaysia, that has been represented in the Dewan Rakyat since 1995.

The federal constituency was created in the 1994 redistribution and is mandated to return a single member to the Dewan Rakyat under the first past the post voting system.

== Demographics ==
https://live.chinapress.com.my/ge15/parliament/KELANTAN

Ethnic breakdown of Jeli's electorate as of 2022
1. Malay (99.0%)
2. Other ethnicities (0.90%)
3. Chinese (0.10%)
4. Indian (0.00%)

As of 2020, Jeli has a population of 78,952 people.

Age breakdown of Jeli's electorate as of 2022
1. 18-20 (6.63%)
2. 21-29 (23.6%)
3. 30-39 (24.4%)
4. 40-49 (17.6%)
5. 50-59 (13.3%)
6. 60-69 (8.84%)
7. 70-79 (4.01%)
8. 80-89 (1.18%)
9. above 90 (0.38%)
Gender breakdown of Jeli's electorate as of 2022
1. Male (50.5%)
2. Female (49.5%)

== History ==
=== Polling districts ===
According to the federal gazette issued on 18 July 2023, the Jeli constituency is divided into 28 polling districts.

State constituency	Polling Districts	Code	Location
Bukit Bunga (N36）	Bukit Bunga	030/36/01	SMK Bukit Bunga
Bukit Bunga (N36）	Jakar	030/36/02	SK Nik Daud
Bukit Bunga (N36）	Nibong	030/36/03	SK Nik Daud
Bukit Bunga (N36）	Jedok Tua	030/36/04	SMU (A) Arab Darul Naim
Bukit Bunga (N36）	Lalang Pepuyu	030/36/05	SK Lalang Pepuyu
Bukit Bunga (N36）	Batu Gajah	030/36/06	SK Batu Gajah
Bukit Bunga (N36）	Asahan	030/36/07	SMK Tan Sri Mohamed Yaacob
Bukit Bunga (N36）	Lawang	030/36/08	SK Lawang
Bukit Bunga (N36）	Gual Jedok	030/36/09	SK Gual Jedok
Bukit Bunga (N36）	Air Canal	030/36/10	SK Ayer Chanal
Air Lanas (N37）	Kalai	030/37/01	SK Kalai
Air Lanas (N37）	Gunong	030/37/02	SK Batu Melintang
Air Lanas (N37）	Bandar Jeli	030/37/03	SK Jeli (1)
Air Lanas (N37）	Gemang	030/37/04	SK Gemang
Air Lanas (N37）	Air Lanas	030/37/05	Maahad Al-Sabirin, Ayer Lanas
Air Lanas (N37）	Legeh	030/37/06	SK Legeh
Air Lanas (N37）	Sungai Satan	030/37/07	SK Legeh
Air Lanas (N37）	Berdang	030/37/08	SK Pasir Dusun
Air Lanas (N37）	Pos Sungai Rual	030/37/09	SK Sungai Rual
Air Lanas (N37）	Kedai Air Lanas	030/37/10	SMK Ayer Lanas
Kuala Balah (N38）	Batu Melintang	030/38/01	SMK Batu Melintang
Kuala Balah (N38）	Pendok	030/38/02	SK Pendok
Kuala Balah (N38）	Sungai Long	030/38/03	SK Sungai Long
Kuala Balah (N38）	Lubok Bongor	030/38/04	SK Lubok Bongor
Kuala Balah (N38）	Kubor Datu	030/38/05	SK Kubor Datu
Kuala Balah (N38）	Jerimbong	030/38/06	SK Bukit Jering
Kuala Balah (N38）	Kedai Kuala Balah	030/38/07	SK Kuala Balah
Kuala Balah (N38）	Kampung Bharu Tg. Abd. Rahman Putra	030/38/08	SMK Kuala Balah

=== Representation history ===
Members of Parliament for Jeli
Parliament	No	Years	Member	Party	Vote Share
Constituency created from Tanah Merah
9th	P030	1995–1999	Mustapa Mohamed (مصطفى محمد)	BN (UMNO)	13,301; 51.10%
10th	P030	1999–2004	Mohd Apandi Mohamad (محمد أڤندي محمد)	BA (PAS)	15,523; 51.14%
11th	P030	2004–2008	Mustapa Mohamed (مصطفى محمد)	BN (UMNO)	16,960; 63.84%
12th	P030	2008–2013	Mustapa Mohamed (مصطفى محمد)	BN (UMNO)	17,168; 57.42%
13th	P030	2013–2018	Mustapa Mohamed (مصطفى محمد)	BN (UMNO)	21,345; 57.14%
14th	P030	2018	Mustapa Mohamed (مصطفى محمد)	BN (UMNO)	21,665; 55.89%
14th	P030	2018	Mustapa Mohamed (مصطفى محمد)	Independent	21,665; 55.89%
14th	P030	2018–2020	Mustapa Mohamed (مصطفى محمد)	PH (BERSATU)	21,665; 55.89%
14th	P030	2020–2022	Mustapa Mohamed (مصطفى محمد)	PN (BERSATU)	21,665; 55.89%
15th	P030	2022–2024	Zahari Kechik (ظهري كچيق)	PN (BERSATU)	27,072; 63.03%
15th	P030	2024–present	Zahari Kechik (ظهري كچيق)	Independent	27,072; 63.03%

=== State constituency ===
Parliamentary constituency	State constituency						
Parliamentary constituency	1955–1959*	1959–1974	1974–1986	1986–1995	1995–2004	2004–2018	2018–present
Jeli					Air Lanas		
Jeli						Bukit Bunga	
Jeli					Kemahang		
Jeli						Kuala Balah	
Jeli					Pergau		

=== Historical boundaries ===
State Constituency	Area		
State Constituency	1994	2003	2018
Air Lanas	Ayer Lanas; Bukit Bunga; Jeli; Kampung Baru Malaysia; Kampung Lengeh	Ayer Lanas; Jeli; Kampung bechah Pulai; Kampung Salor; Lengeh	Ayer Lanas; Jeli; Kampung Salor; Lengeh; Sungai Long
Bukit Bunga		Batu Gajah; Bukit Bunga; Bukit Kusial; Jakar; Nibong	Batu Gajah; Bukit Bunga; Jakar; Kampung Lawang; Nibong
Kemahang	Batang Merbau; Bendang Nyior; FELDA Kemahang; Kampung Bechah Tok Kar; Kuala Kepok		
Kuala Balah		Batu Melintang; Dusun Manal; Kampung Lawar; Kampung Renyok; Kuala Balah	Batu Melintang; Dusun Manal; Kampung Lawar; Kampung Renyok; Sungai Long
Pergau	Batu Melintang; Dusun Manal; Kampung Salor; Kuala Balah; Pergau		

=== Current state assembly members ===
No.	State Constituency	Member	Coalition (Party)
N36	Bukit Bunga	Mohd Almidi Jaafar	PN (BERSATU)
N37	Ayer Lanas	Kamarudin Md Nor	PN (BERSATU)
N38	Kuala Balah	Abdul Hadi Awang Kechil	PN (PAS)

=== Local governments & postcodes ===
No.	State Constituency	Local Government	Postcode
N36	Bukit Bunga	Tanah Merah District Council	17510 Tanah Merah; 17600 Jeli; 17610 Kuala Balah; 17700 Ayer Lanas
N37	Ayer Lanas	Jeli District Council	17510 Tanah Merah; 17600 Jeli; 17610 Kuala Balah; 17700 Ayer Lanas
N38	Kuala Balah	Jeli District Council	17510 Tanah Merah; 17600 Jeli; 17610 Kuala Balah; 17700 Ayer Lanas

== Election results ==
Malaysian general election, 2022
Party	Candidate	Votes	%	∆%
PAS	Zahari Kechik	27,072	63.03	▲24.48
BN	Norwahida Patuan	14,608	34.01	▼21.88
PH	Md Radzi Wahab	1,140	2.65	▲2.65
PUTRA	Mohammad Daud	133	0.31	▲0.31
Total valid votes		42,953	100.00	
Total rejected ballots		635		
Unreturned ballots		144		
Turnout		43,732	71.83	▼11.65
Registered electors		59,798		
Majority		12,464	29.02	▲11.88
PAS gain from BN		Swing		?
Source(s) https://lom.agc.gov.my/ilims/upload/portal/akta/outputp/1753266/PUB%20607%20(2022).pdf

Malaysian general election, 2018
Party	Candidate	Votes	%	∆%
BN	Mustapa Mohamed	21,665	55.89	▼1.25
PAS	Mohamad Hamid	15,018	38.75	▼4.11
PKR	Azran Deraman	2,078	5.36	▲5.36
Total valid votes		38,761	100.00	
Total rejected ballots		400		
Unreturned ballots		466		
Turnout		39,627	83.48	▼4.14
Registered electors		47,470		
Majority		6,647	17.14	▲2.86
BN hold		Swing		
Source(s) "His Majesty's Government Gazette - Notice of Contested Election, Parliament for the State of Kelantan [P.U. (B) 234/2018]" (PDF). Attorney General's Chambers of Malaysia. 3 May 2018. "Federal Government Gazette - Results of Contested Election and Statements of the Poll after the Official Addition of Votes, Parliamentary Constituencies for the State of Kelantan [P.U. (B) 308/2018]" (PDF). Attorney General's Chambers of Malaysia. 28 May 2018.

Malaysian general election, 2013
Party	Candidate	Votes	%	∆%
BN	Mustapa Mohamed	21,345	57.14	▼0.28
PAS	Mohd Apandi Mohamad	16,009	42.86	▲0.28
Total valid votes		37,354	100.00	
Total rejected ballots		424		
Unreturned ballots		93		
Turnout		37,871	87.62	▲3.44
Registered electors		43,224		
Majority		5,336	14.28	▼0.56
BN hold		Swing		
Source(s) "Federal Government Gazette - Notice of Contested Election, Parliament for the State of Kelantan [P.U. (B) 171/2013]" (PDF). Attorney General's Chambers of Malaysia. 26 April 2013. "Federal Government Gazette - Results of Contested Election and Statements of the Poll after the Official Addition of Votes, Parliamentary Constituencies for the State of Kelantan [P.U. (B) 212/2013]" (PDF). Attorney General's Chambers of Malaysia. 22 May 2013. Archived from the original (PDF) on 2019-12-29.

Malaysian general election, 2008
Party	Candidate	Votes	%	∆%
BN	Mustapa Mohamed	17,168	57.42	▼6.42
PAS	Mohd Apandi Mohamad	12,732	42.58	▲6.42
Total valid votes		29,900	100.00	
Total rejected ballots		474		
Unreturned ballots		181		
Turnout		30,555	84.18	▲1.80
Registered electors		36,298		
Majority		4,436	14.84	▼12.84
BN hold		Swing		

Malaysian general election, 2004
Party	Candidate	Votes	%	∆%
BN	Mustapa Mohamed	16,960	63.84	▲14.98
PAS	Mohd Apandi Mohamad	9,607	36.16	▼14.98
Total valid votes		26,567	100.00	
Total rejected ballots		394		
Unreturned ballots		0		
Turnout		26,961	82.38	▲0.46
Registered electors		32,727		
Majority		7,353	27.68	▲25.40
BN gain from PAS		Swing		?

Malaysian general election, 1999
Party	Candidate	Votes	%	∆%
PAS	Mohd Apandi Mohamad	15,523	51.14	▲51.14
BN	Mustapa Mohamed	14,830	48.86	▼2.24
Total valid votes		30,353	100.00	
Total rejected ballots		529		
Unreturned ballots		270		
Turnout		31,152	81.92	▲0.55
Registered electors		38,027		
Majority		693	2.28	▲0.08
PAS gain from BN		Swing		?

Malaysian general election, 1995
Party	Candidate	Votes	%
BN	Mustapa Mohamed	13,301	51.10
S46	Zianon Abdin Ali	12,729	48.90
Total valid votes		26,030	100.00
Total rejected ballots		932	
Unreturned ballots		71	
Turnout		27,033	81.37
Registered electors		33,222	
Majority		572	2.20
This was a new constituency created.
