= Ayer Lanas (Kelantan state constituency) =

State constituency in Kelantan, Malaysia

Ayer Lanas (N37)
Kelantan constituency

State constituency
- Legislature: Kelantan State Legislative Assembly
MLA
Kamarudin Md Nor
PN
- Constituency created: 1995
- First contested: 1995
- Last contested: 2023

Demographics
- Electors (2023): 22,468

Ayer Lanas is a state constituency in Kelantan, Malaysia, that has been represented in the Kelantan State Legislative Assembly.

The state constituency was first contested in 1995 and is mandated to return a single Assemblyman to the Kelantan State Legislative Assembly under the first-past-the-post voting system.

== Demographics ==
As of 2020, Air Lanas has a population of 37,440 people.

Ethnic breakdown of Ayer Lanas's electorate as of 2023
1. Malay (96.8%)
2. Other ethnicities (2.96%)
3. Chinese (0.23%)
4. Indian (0.06%)

== History ==
=== Polling districts ===
According to the gazette issued on 30 March 2018, the Bukit Bunga constituency has a total of 10 polling districts.

State Constituency	Polling Districts	Code	Location
Air Lanas (N37）	Kalai	030/37/01	SK Kalai
Air Lanas (N37）	Gunong	030/37/02	SK Batu Melintang
Air Lanas (N37）	Bandar Jeli	030/37/03	SK Jeli (1)
Air Lanas (N37）	Gemang	030/37/04	SK Gemang
Air Lanas (N37）	Air Lanas	030/37/05	Maahad Al-Sabirin, Ayer Lanas
Air Lanas (N37）	Legeh	030/37/06	SK Legeh
Air Lanas (N37）	Sungai Satan	030/37/07	Dewan RPT KESEDAR Sg. Satan dan Dewan Orang Ramai KESEDAR Sg. Satan
Air Lanas (N37）	Berdang	030/37/08	SK Pasir Dusun
Air Lanas (N37）	Pos Sungai Rual	030/37/09	Dewan Sri Basor Pos Sungai Rual
Air Lanas (N37）	Kedai Air Lanas	030/37/10	SMK Ayer Lanas

=== Representation History ===
Members of the Legislative Assembly for Ayer Lanas
Assembly	No	Years	Member	Party
Constituency created from Jeli
Air Lanas
9th	N36	1995–1999	Abdullah Ya'kub	PAS
10th	N36	1999–2004	Abdullah Ya'kub	PAS
11th	N37	2004–2008	Mustapa Mohamed	BN (UMNO)
12th	N37	2008–2013	Abdullah Ya'kub	PR (PAS)
13th	N37	2013–2018	Mustapa Mohamed	BN (UMNO)
Ayer Lanas
14th	N37	2018	Mustapa Mohamed	BN (UMNO)
14th	N37	2018–2020	Mustapa Mohamed	PH (BERSATU)
14th	N37	2020–2023	Mustapa Mohamed	PN (BERSATU)
15th	N37	2023–present	Kamarudin Md Nor	PN (BERSATU)

== Election results ==
Kelantan state election, 2023: Ayer Lanas
Party	Candidate	Votes	%	∆%
PAS	Kamarudin Md Nor	9,535	67.81	▲21.09
BN	Nasrul Hadi Kamarulzaman	4,526	32.19	▼16.97
Total valid votes		14,061	100.00	
Total rejected ballots		128		
Unreturned ballots		20		
Turnout		14,209	63.24	▼21.62
Registered electors		22,468		
Majority		5,009	35.62	▲33.18
PAS gain from BN		Swing		?

Kelantan state election, 2018: Ayer Lanas
Party	Candidate	Votes	%	∆%
BN	Mustapa Mohamed	7,243	49.16	▼1.02
PAS	Abdullah Ya'kub	6,884	46.72	▼3.10
PKR	Aminuddin Yaacob	608	4.12	▲4.12
Total valid votes		14,735	100.00	
Total rejected ballots		173		
Unreturned ballots		122		
Turnout		15,030	84.86	▼4.24
Registered electors		17,711		
Majority		359	2.44	▲2.08
BN hold		Swing		

Kelantan state election, 2013: Ayer Lanas
Party	Candidate	Votes	%	∆%
BN	Mustapa Mohamed	6,605	50.18	▲3.94
PAS	Abdullah Ya'kub	6,558	49.82	▼3.94
Total valid votes		13,163	100.00	
Total rejected ballots		166		
Unreturned ballots		36		
Turnout		13,365	89.10	▲3.76
Registered electors		15,007		
Majority		47	0.36	▼7.16
BN gain from PAS		Swing		?

Kelantan state election, 2008: Ayer Lanas
Party	Candidate	Votes	%	∆%
PAS	Abdullah Ya'kub	5,690	53.76	▲7.99
BN	Azmi Setapa	4,895	46.24	▼7.99
Total valid votes		10,585	100.00	
Total rejected ballots		123		
Unreturned ballots		51		
Turnout		10,759	85.34	▲1.42
Registered electors		12,607		
Majority		795	7.52	▼0.94
PAS gain from BN		Swing		?

Kelantan state election, 2004: Ayer Lanas
Party	Candidate	Votes	%	∆%
BN	Mustapa Mohamed	5,118	54.23	▲9.81
PAS	Abdullah Ya'kub	4,319	45.77	▼9.81
Total valid votes		9,437	100.00	
Total rejected ballots		166		
Unreturned ballots		0		
Turnout		9,522	83.92	▲4.33
Registered electors		11,347		
Majority		799	8.46	▼2.70
BN gain from PAS		Swing		?

Kelantan state election, 1999: Ayer Lanas
Party	Candidate	Votes	%	∆%
PAS	Abdullah Ya'kub	5,634	55.58	▲3.22
BN	Zainon Abidin Ali	4,502	44.42	▼3.22
Total valid votes		10,136	100.00	
Total rejected ballots		238		
Unreturned ballots		27		
Turnout		10,401	79.59	▲0.17
Registered electors		13,069		
Majority		1,132	11.16	▲6.44
PAS hold		Swing		

Kelantan state election, 1995: Ayer Lanas
Party	Candidate	Votes	%
PAS	Abdullah Ya'kub	4,540	52.36
BN	Mustafa Musa	4,131	47.64
Total valid votes		8,671	100.00
Total rejected ballots		162	
Unreturned ballots		51	
Turnout		8,884	79.42
Registered electors		11,186	
Majority		409	4.72
This was a new constituency created.
