= Statistics of the COVID-19 pandemic in Malaysia =

== Tables and lists ==
=== Distribution of cases by administrative regions ===
Date	JH	KD	KE	ML	NS	PH	PG	PK	PR	SB	SR	SE	TR	KL	PT	LB	Source
25/1	1											3					
28/1	2(1)	1										4(1)					
30/1	3(1)	1										4					
3/2	3	1										5(1)		1			
5/2	3	2(1)			2							5		2(1)			
6/2	4(1)	2			2							5		2			
7/2	4	2			2							5		3(1)			
8/2	4	2			2							6(1)		3(1)			
9/2	4	2			2							7(1)		3(1)			
13/2	4	2			2							7		4(1)			
14/2	4	4(2)			2							7		4			
15/2	4	4			2							8(1)		4			
27/2	4	4			2							8		5(1)			
28/2	4	4			2							9(1)		6(1)			
1/3	4	4			2							12(3)		7(1)			
3/3	4	4			2							17(5)		9(2)			
4/3-12/3	—N/a																
13/3	20	5	3	1	11	2	7	2	1	15		87		40	1	2	
14/3	22(2)	5	3	6(5)	19(8)	2	7	2	2(1)	26(11)	6(6)	92(5)		43(3)	1	2	
15/3	—N/a																
16/3	52	31	18	14	42	19	15	18	8	57	21	144	4	106		4	
17/3	77(25)	31	25(7)	17(3)	45(3)	28(9)	23(8)	23(5)	8	82(25)	29(8)	161(17)	7(3)	113(7)		4	
18/3	88(11)	36(5)	30(5)	18(1)	45	29(1)	30(7)	28(5)	8	103(21)	49(20)	192(31)	10(3)	119(6)		5(1)	
19/3	101(13)	40(4)	44(14)	20(2)	55(10)	32(3)	32(2)	35(7)	9(1)	112(9)	51(2)	223(31)	11(1)	123	6	5	
20/3	114(13)	41(1)	51(7)	22(2)	65(10)	36(4)	37(5)	45(10)	9	119(7)	58(7)	263(40)	20(9)	139(16)	6	5	
21/3	129(15)	47(6)	61(10)	22	70(5)	37(1)	50(13)	55(10)	9	136(17)	68(10)	292(29)	27(7)	166(27)	9(3)	5	
22/3	145(16)	52(5)	63(2)	23(1)	78(8)	40(3)	58(8)	66(11)	9	158(22)	76(8)	309(17)	32(5)	183(17)	9	5	
23/3	158(13)	59(7)	71(8)	25(2)	94(16)	56(16)	66(8)	81(15)	9	169(11)	78(2)	354(45)	38(6)	242(59)	13(4)	5	
24/3	162(4)	64(5)	78(7)	31(6)	109(15)	56	68(2)	98(17)	9	170(1)	83(5)	381(27)	38	257(15)	15(2)	5	
25/3	196(34)	69(5)	84(6)	33(2)	123(14)	64(8)	70(2)	128(30)	10(1)	170	85(2)	435(54)	38	270(13)	16(1)	5	
26/3	239(43)	72(3)	94(10)	33	132(9)	66(2)	74(4)	151(23)	10	172(2)	95(10)	510(75)	39(1)	321(51)	18(2)	5	
27/3	259(20)	73(1)	98(4)	33	138(6)	70(4)	80(6)	159(8)	10	182(10)	110(15)	546(36)	41(2)	337(16)	20(2)	5	
28/3	285(26)	74(1)	108(10)	42(9)	153(15)	84(14)	86(6)	165(6)	10	197(15)	118(8)	579(33)	45(4)	344(7)	20	10(5)	
29/3	309(24)	75(1)	123(15)	43(1)	162(9)	96(12)	87(1)	176(11)	10	197	129(11)	612(33)	47(2)	372(28)	22(2)	10	
30/3	333(24)	77(2)	127(4)	50(7)	172(10)	99(3)	88(1)	184(8)	11(1)	201(4)	135(6)	672(60)	47	396(24)	24(2)	10	
31/3	349(16)	77	131(4)	52(2)	181(9)	102(3)	94(6)	189(5)	12(1)	206(5)	156(21)	704(32)	47	430(34)	26(2)	10	
1/4	368(19)	79(2)	134(3)	63(11)	189(8)	111(9)	96(2)	194(5)	12	209(3)	188(32)	726(22)	48(1)	455(25)	26	10	
2/4	395(27)	80(1)	137(3)	70(7)	207(18)	114(3)	98(2)	200(6)	12	210(1)	211(23)	800(74)	50(2)	488(33)	34(8)	10	
3/4	416(21)	81(1)	137	73(3)	211(4)	127(13)	98	205(5)	12	215(5)	239(28)	863(63)	68(18)	543(55)	35(1)	10	
4/4	422(6)	81	139(2)	75(2)	220(9)	151(24)	99(1)	207(2)	12	225(10)	246(7)	890(27)	74(6)	595(52)	36(1)	11(1)	
5/4	438(16)	82(1)	141(2)	89(14)	231(11)	158(7)	101(2)	213(6)	13(1)	238(13)	261(15)	943(53)	84(10)	622(27)	37(1)	11	
6/4	468(30)	85(3)	142(1)	99(10)	239(8)	161(3)	101	219(6)	13	240(2)	273(12)	970(27)	90(6)	640(18)	41(4)	12(1)	
7/4	478(10)	90(5)	147(5)	103(4)	261(22)	166(5)	102(1)	233(14)	17(4)	241(1)	288(15)	1,020(50)	90	671(31)	43(2)	13(1)	
8/4	496(18)	91(1)	147	116(13)	270(9)	169(3)	108(6)	237(4)	17	248(7)	306(18)	1,078(58)	93(3)	685(14)	45(2)	13	
9/4	503(7)	93(2)	148(1)	119(3)	281(11)	183(14)	108	241(4)	17	248	312(6)	1,118(40)	98(5)	699(14)	47(2)	13	
10/4	523(20)	93	149(1)	133(14)	292(11)	187(4)	109(1)	242(1)	17	250(2)	327(15)	1,148(30)	101(3)	713(14)	49(2)	13	
11/4	544(21)	93	151(2)	141(8)	309(17)	214(27)	114(5)	243(1)	17	260(10)	334(7)	1,183(35)	102(1)	759(46)	51(2)	15(2)	
12/4	558(14)	93	152(1)	144(3)	318(9)	225(11)	116(2)	244(1)	17	266(6)	342(8)	1,236(53)	102	803(44)	52(1)	15	
13/4	579(21)	93	154(2)	144	360(42)	225	116	247(3)	17	280(14)	348(6)	1,249(13)	106(4)	830(27)	54(2)	15	
14/4	587(8)	93	154	147(3)	362(2)	236(11)	119(3)	250(3)	18(1)	285(5)	363(15)	1,299(50)	106	899(69)	54	15	
15/4	601(14)	94(1)	154	147	363(1)	253(17)	119	250	18	285	371(8)	1,316(17)	106	926(27)	54	15	
16/4	614(13)	94	155(1)	147	389(26)	261(8)	119	251(1)	18	288(3)	387(16)	1,329(13)	108(2)	952(26)	55(1)	15	
17/4	623(9)	94	155	148(1)	402(13)	262(1)	119	252(1)	18	293(5)	397(10)	1,338(9)	108	971(19)	55	16(1)	
18/4	639(16)	94	155	148	405(3)	264(2)	119	252	18	303(10)	403(6)	1,340(2)	109(1)	985(14)	55	16	
19/4	642(3)	94	155	185(37)	405	269(5)	119	252	18	306(3)	408(5)	1,343(3)	109	1,004(19)	64(9)	16	
20/4	644(2)	94	155	187(2)	408(3)	271(2)	119	252	18	308(2)	414(6)	1,345(2)	109	1,008(4)	77(13)	16	
21/4	645(1)	94	155	188(1)	409(1)	279(8)	119	252	18	308	436(22)	1,356(11)	109	1,021(13)	77	16	
22/4	648(3)	95(1)	155	189(1)	411(2)	285(6)	119	252	18	308	455(19)	1,357(1)	109	1,037(16)	78(1)	16	
23/4	651(3)	95	155	189	431(20)	286(1)	119	252	18	309(1)	459(4)	1,369(12)	110(1)	1,066(29)	78	16	
24/4	655(4)	95	155	192(3)	433(2)	287(1)	119	252	18	311(2)	468(9)	1,387(18)	110	1,115(49)	78	16	
25/4	655	95	155	192	433	288(1)	119	252	18	311	478(10)	1,388(1)	110	1,154(39)	78	16	
26/4	659(4)	95	155	193(1)	434(1)	288	121(2)	252	18	311	485(7)	1,394(6)	110	1,170(16)	79(1)	16	
27/4	659	95	155	193	435(1)	288	121	253(1)	18	312(1)	488(3)	1,398(4)	110	1,200(30)	79	16	
28/4	660(1)	95	155	193	436(1)	288	121	253	18	313(1)	496(8)	1,403(5)	110	1,214(14)	80(1)	16	
29/4	660	95	155	193	508(72)	293(5)	121	253	18	315(2)	502(6)	1,404(1)	110	1,222(8)	80	16	
30/4	663(3)	95	155	198(5)	513(5)	294(1)	121	253	18	315	507(5)	1,431(27)	110	1,232(10)	81(1)	16	
1/5	666(3)	95	155	199(1)	513	297(3)	121	253	18	315	509(2)	1,455(24)	110	1,264(32)	85(4)	16	
2/5	667(1)	95	155	201(2)	521(8)	305(8)	121	253	18	315	518(9)	1,518(63)	110	1,278(14)	85	16	
3/5	667	95	155	204(3)	592(71)	305	121	253	18	316(1)	523(5)	1,529(11)	110	1,308(30)	86(1)	16	
4/5	667	95	155	207(3)	598(6)	305	121	253	18	316	523	1,550(21)	110	1,333(25)	86	16	
5/5	667	95	155	207	598	305	121	253	18	316	525(2)	1,555(5)	110	1,356(23)	86	16	
6/5	667	95	155	208(1)	600(2)	305	121	253	18	316	536(11)	1,564(9)	110	1,378(22)	86	16	
7/5	667	95	155	209(1)	600	305	121	253	18	317(1)	537(1)	1,580(16)	110	1,398(20)	86	16	
8/5	667	95	155	209	653(53)	306(1)	121	253	18	317	538(1)	1,586(6)	110	1,404(6)	87(1)	16	
9/5	667	95	155	210(1)	681(28)	306	121	253	18	317	542(4)	1,596(10)	110	1,414(10)	88(1)	16	
10/5	667	95	155	210	726(45)	308(2)	121	255(2)	18	317	543(1)	1,604(8)	110	1,423(9)	88	16	
11/5	667	95	155	211(1)	742(16)	312(4)	121	255	18	327(10)	543	1,607(3)	110	1,458(35)	89(1)	16	
12/5	667	95	155	211	742	312	121	255	18	328(1)	543	1,610(3)	110	1,470(12)	89	16	
13/5	667	95	155	213(2)	764(22)	315(3)	121	255	18	330(2)	544(1)	1,612(2)	110	1,475(5)	89	16	
14/5	668(1)	95	155	214(1)	775(11)	323(8)	121	255	18	330	544	1,613(1)	110	1,493(18)	89	16	
15/5	668	95	155	215(1)	776(1)	328(5)	121	255	18	330	544	1,627(14)	110	1,508(15)	89	16	
16/5	668	95	155	215	776	335(7)	121	255	18	331(1)	544	1,628(1)	110	1,515(7)	90(1)	16	
17/5	668	95	155	215	776	336(1)	121	255	18	331	544	1,636(8)	110	1,528(13)	90	16	
18/5	668	95	155	215	776	336	121	255	18	331	544	1,644(8)	110	1,566(38)	91(1)	16	
19/5	669(1)	95	155	215	776	338(2)	121	255	18	337(6)	544	1,650(6)	110	1,588(22)	91	16	
20/5	669	96(1)	156(1)	215	776	338	121	255	18	338(1)	544	1,665(15)	111(1)	1,598(10)	93(2)	16	
21/5	669	96	156	215	778(2)	339(1)	121	255	18	338	544	1,673(8)	111	1,637(39)	93	16	
22/5	669	96	156	216(1)	791(13)	341(2)	121	255	18	340(2)	545(1)	1,693(20)	111	1,676(39)	93	16	
23/5	670(1)	96	156	216	792(1)	344(3)	121	255	18	341(1)	545	1,730(37)	111	1,681(5)	93	16	
24/5	671(1)	96	156	216	792	344	121	255	18	343(2)	545	1,776(46)	111	1,692(11)	93	16	
25/5	671	96	156	216	792	344	121	255	18	343	549(4)	1,829(53)	111	1,807(115)	93	16	
26/5	671	96	156	216	793(1)	344	121	255	18	343	549	1,838(9)	111	1,984(177)	93	16	
27/5	671	96	156	216	793	344	121	255	18	344(1)	552(3)	1,843(5)	111	1,990(6)	93	16	
28/5	671	96	156	216	793	345(1)	121	255	18	344	552	1,845(2)	111	1,997(7)	93	16	
29/5	674(3)	96	156	216	852(59)	346(1)	121	255	18	346(2)	552	1,873(28)	111	2,007(10)	93	16	
30/5	675(1)	96	156	218(2)	856(4)	346	121	256(1)	18	346	552	1,878(5)	111	2,020(13)	97(4)	16	
31/5	675	96	156	219(1)	858(2)	361(15)	121	256	18	346	552	1,909(31)	111	2,028(8)	97	16	
1/6	675	96	156	232(13)	860(2)	361	121	256	18	347(1)	552	1,920(11)	111	2,039(11)	97	16	
2/6	676(1)	96	156	233(1)	866(6)	361	121	256	18	348(1)	552	1,926(6)	111	2,044(5)	97	16	
3/6	676	96	156	233	902(36)	361	121	256	18	348	552	1,928(2)	111	2,099(55)	97	16	
4/6	676	96	156	233	905(3)	362(1)	121	256	18	348	552	1,930(2)	111	2,370(271)	97	16	
5/6	676	96	156	234(1)	905	363(1)	121	256	18	351(3)	553(1)	1,939(9)	111	2,374(4)	97	16	
6/6	676	96	156	234	910(5)	363	121	256	18	351	555(2)	1,953(14)	111	2,389(15)	97	17(1)	
7/6	676	96	156	234	911(1)	363	121	256	18	353(2)	555	1,965(12)	111	2,393(4)	97	17	
8/6	676	96	156	235(1)	911	363	121	256	18	355(2)	555	1,968(3)	111	2,394(1)	97	17	
9/6	676	96	156	235	911	363	121	256	18	355	555	1,971(3)	111	2,398(4)	97	17	
10/6	677(1)	96	156	235	911	363	121	256	18	355	556(1)	1,971	111	2,398	97	17	
11/6	677	96	156	246(11)	927(16)	363	121	256	18	355	556	1,974(3)	111	2,399(1)	97	17	
12/6	678(1)	96	156	250(4)	931(4)	363	121	256	18	356(1)	556	1,987(13)	111	2,409(10)	97	17	
13/6	680(2)	96	156	252(2)	957(26)	365(2)	121	257(1)	18	358(2)	556	1,994(7)	111	2,410(1)	97	17	
14/6	680	96	156	253(1)	957	365	121	257	18	358	557(1)	1,996(2)	111	2,414(4)	97	17	
15/6	683(3)	96	156	255(2)	989(32)	365	121	257	18	359(1)	557	1,998(2)	111	2,415(1)	97	17	
16/6	684(1)	96	156	255	993(4)	365	121	257	18	359	560(3)	1,999(1)	111	2,417(2)	97	17	
17/6	684	96	156	255	994(1)	365	121	257	18	361(2)	561(1)	2,004(5)	111	2,418(1)	97	17	
18/6	686(2)	96	156	255	994	365	121	258(1)	18	362(1)	565(4)	2,006(2)	111	2,422(4)	97	17	
19/6	686	96	156	255	995(1)	365	121	258	18	362	566(1)	2,009(3)	111	2,423(1)	97	17	
20/6	686	96	156	255	996(1)	365	121	258	18	363(1)	566	2,021(12)	111	2,430(7)	97	17	
21/6	687(1)	96	156	256(1)	1,002(6)	365	121	258	18	364(1)	569(3)	2,025(4)	111	2,430	97	17	
22/6	688(1)	96	156	256	1,014(12)	365	121	258	18	364	569	2,027(2)	111	2,430	97	17	
23/6	688	96	156	256	1,015(1)	365	121	258	18	366(2)	569	2,027	111	2,430	97	17	
24/6	688	96	156	256	1,015	365	121	258	18	366	570(1)	2,032(5)	111	2,430	97	17	
25/6	689(1)	96	157(1)	256	1,015	365	121	258	18	366	570	2,034(2)	111	2,430	97	17	
26/6	691(2)	97(1)	157	256	1,015	365	121	258	18	366	570	2,036(2)	111	2,431(1)	97	17	
27/6	691	97	157	256	1,016(1)	365	121	258	18	368(2)	570	2,039(3)	111	2,435(4)	97	17	
28/6	691	97	157	256	1,025(9)	365	121	258	18	370(2)	571(1)	2,044(5)	111	2,436(1)	97	17	
29/6	691	97	157	256	1,025	365	121	258	18	371(1)	571	2,046(2)	111	2,436	97	17	
30/6	691	97	157	256	1,025	365	121	258	18	372(1)	571	2,047(1)	111	2,436	97	17	
1/7	691	97	157	256	1,025	365	121	258	18	372	571	2,048(1)	111	2,436	97	17	
2/7	692(1)	97	157	256	1,025	365	121	258	18	373(1)	571	2,048	111	2,437(1)	97	17	
3/7	692	97	157	256	1,025	365	121	258	18	375(2)	571	2,051(3)	111	2,437	97	17	
4/7	692	97	157	256	1,026(1)	365	121	258	18	376(1)	571	2,058(7)	111	2,438(1)	97	17	
5/7	692	97	157	256	1,027(1)	365	121	258	18	378(2)	571	2,060(2)	111	2,438	97	17	
6/7	693(1)	97	157	256	1,027	365	121	258	18	378	572(1)	2,062(2)	111	2,439(1)	97	17	
7/7	694(1)	97	157	256	1,027	365	121	258	18	378	572	2,065(3)	111	2,441(2)	97	17	
8/7	694	97	157	256	1,027	365	121	258	18	378	573(1)	2,066(1)	111	2,442(1)	97	17	
9/7	696(2)	97	157	256	1,027	365	121	258	18	378	573	2,070(4)	111	2,442	97	17	
10/7	697(1)	98(1)	157	256	1,027	365	121	258	18	378	575(2)	2,076(6)	111	2,445(3)	97	17	
11/7	699(2)	98	157	256	1,027	365	121	258	18	379(1)	577(2)	2,079(3)	111	2,445	97	17	
12/7	699	98	157	257(1)	1,027	365	121	258	18	380(1)	579(2)	2,088(9)	111	2,445	98(1)	17	
13/7	699	99(1)	157	258(1)	1,027	365	121	258	18	380	580(1)	2,092(4)	111	2,445	98	17	
14/7	701(2)	99	157	258	1,027	365	121	258	18	380	580	2,093(1)	111	2,446(1)	98	17	
15/7	701	99	157	258	1,027	365	121	258	18	380	583(3)	2,094(1)	111	2,447(1)	98	17	
16/7	701	99	157	258	1,027	365	121	258	18	380	584(1)	2,094	112(1)	2,448(1)	98	17	
17/7	701	99	157	258	1,027	365	121	258	18	381(1)	594(10)	2,098(4)	114(2)	2,449(1)	98	17	
18/7	701	99	158(1)	258	1,027	365	121	258	18	381	601(7)	2,099(1)	114	2,449	98	17	
19/7	702(1)	99	158	258	1,027	365	121	260(2)	18	382(1)	607(6)	2,103(4)	114	2,450(1)	98	17	
20/7	716(14)	100(1)	158	258	1,028(1)	365	121	260	18	382	608(1)	2,107(4)	114	2,450	98	17	
21/7	716	100	158	258	1,028	365	121	260	18	383(1)	619(11)	2,109(2)	114	2,451(1)	98	17	
22/7	717(1)	100	158	258	1,028	365	121	261(1)	18	383	628(9)	2,112(3)	114	2,453(2)	98	17	
23/7	718(1)	100	159(1)	258	1,028	366(1)	121	261	18	384(1)	632(4)	2,112	114	2,454(1)	98	17	
24/7	720(2)	100	159	258	1,028	369(3)	121	262(1)	18	384	641(9)	2,115(3)	114	2,457(3)	98	17	
25/7	730(10)	100	159	258	1,028	369	121	262	18	384	649(8)	2,118(3)	114	2,458(1)	98	18(1)	
26/7	737(7)	100	160(1)	258	1,028	370(1)	121	262	18	385(1)	650(1)	2,118	114	2,460(2)	98	18	
27/7	737	100	160	258	1,028	370	121	262	18	389(4)	650	2,119(1)	114	2,462(2)	98	18	
28/7	737	106(6)	160	258	1,028	370	121	262	18	392(3)	675(25)	2,119	114	2,466(4)	98	19(1)	
29/7	738(1)	106	160	258	1,028	370	121	262	19(1)	393(1)	677(2)	2,121(2)	114	2,472(6)	98	19	
30/7	739(1)	107(1)	160	258	1,028	370	121	262	19	397(4)	677	2,122(1)	114	2,473(1)	98	19	
31/7	742(3)	109(2)	160	258	1,029(1)	370	121	262	19	398(1)	678(1)	2,123(1)	114	2,476(3)	98	19	
1/8	742	110(1)	160	258	1,029	370	121	264(2)	19	398	678	2,129(6)	114	2,476	98	19	
2/8	742	121(11)	160	258	1,029	370	121	264	19	400(2)	678	2,130(1)	114	2,476	98	19	
3/8	742	122(1)	160	258	1,029	370	121	264	19	400	678	2,130	114	2,476	98	20(1)	
4/8	742	122	160	258	1,029	370	121	264	20(1)	400	678	2,130	114	2,476	98	20	
5/8	743(1)	125(3)	160	258	1,029	370	121	264	20	402(2)	678	2,130	114	2,491(15)	98	20	
6/8	743	131(6)	160	258	1,031(2)	370	121	264	20	406(4)	678	2,130	114	2,493(2)	98	21(1)	
7/8	744(1)	132(1)	160	258	1,031	370	122(1)	266(2)	30(10)	410(4)	679(1)	2,132(2)	114	2,496(3)	98	21	
8/8	744	132	160	258	1,032(1)	370	122	266	30	410	680(1)	2,133(1)	114	2,499(3)	98	22(1)	
9/8	744	132	160	258	1,032	370	125(3)	266	30	410	681(1)	2,134(1)	114	2,506(7)	99(1)	22	
10/8	746(2)	132	160	259(1)	1,032	370	125	269(3)	30	410	681	2,138(4)	114	2,507(1)	99	22	
11/8	747(1)	132	160	259	1,032	370	125	269	30	411(1)	681	2,139(1)	114	2,513(6)	99	22	
12/8	749(2)	134(2)	160	259	1,032	370	125	269	30	415(4)	681	2,139	114	2,516(3)	99	22	
13/8	749	143(9)	160	259	1,032	370	125	269	30	415	681	2,142(3)	114	2,519(3)	99	22	
14/8	749	155(12)	160	259	1,032	370	126(1)	269	30	415	682(1)	2,144(2)	114	2,523(4)	99	22	
15/8	750(1)	169(14)	160	259	1,034(2)	370	128(2)	269	31(1)	415	682	2,144	114	2,529(6)	99	22	
16/8	750	174(5)	160	259	1,034	370	129(1)	269	31	416(1)	682	2,149(5)	114	2,542(13)	99	22	
17/8	750	180(6)	160	259	1,034	370	132(3)	269	31	416	682	2,150(1)	114	2,544(2)	99	22	
18/8	750	183(3)	160	259	1,034	370	132	269	31	416	682	2,150	114	2,548(4)	99	22	
19/8	751(1)	190(7)	160	259	1,034	370	136(4)	269	31	416	682	2,150	114	2,551(3)	99	23(1)	
20/8	751	190	160	259	1,034	370	136	269	31	416	686(4)	2,151(1)	114	2,551	99	23	
21/8	751	193(3)	160	259	1,034	370	136	269	31	416	687(1)	2,153(2)	114	2,554(3)	99	23	
22/8	751	198(5)	160	259	1,034	370	136	269	31	417(1)	688(1)	2,153	114	2,555(1)	99	23	
23/8	751	200(2)	160	259	1,034	370	136	269	31	417	691(3)	2,155(2)	114	2,558(3)	99	23	
24/8	751	200	160	259	1,034	370	136	269	31	417	696(5)	2,155	114	2,560(2)	99	23	
25/8	751	207(7)	160	259	1,034	370	136	269	32(1)	417	696	2,158(3)	114	2,560	99	23	
26/8	751	212(5)	160	259	1,034	370	136	269	32	417	696	2,159(1)	114	2,560	99	23	
27/8	751	212	160	262(3)	1,034	370	136	269	32	417	696	2,161(2)	114	2,560	99	23	
28/8	751	213(1)	160	262	1,034	370	136	269	32	417	697(1)	2,164(3)	114	2,565(5)	99	23	
29/8	751	213	160	262	1,034	370	136	269	32	417	698(1)	2,166(2)	114	2,573(8)	99	23	
30/8	751	214(1)	160	262	1,034	370	136	269	32	417	699(1)	2,167(1)	114	2,587(14)	99	23	
31/8	751	216(2)	160	262	1,034	370	136	269	32	417	699	2,171(4)	114	2,587	99	23	
1/9	751	218(2)	160	262	1,034	370	136	269	32	426(9)	699	2,174(3)	114	2,587	99	23	
2/9	751	218	160	262	1,034	371(1)	136	269	32	426	699	2,175(1)	114	2,591(4)	99	23	
3/9	752(1)	222(4)	160	262	1,036(2)	371	136	269	32	432(6)	699	2,175	114	2,592(1)	99	23	
4/9	752	223(1)	160	262	1,037(1)	371	136	269	32	432	699	2,177(2)	114	2,599(7)	99	23	
5/9	752	224(1)	160	262	1,037	371	136	269	32	433(1)	699	2,177	114	2,603(4)	99	23	
6/9	752	224	160	262	1,037	371	137(1)	269	32	435(2)	699	2,177	114	2,606(3)	99	23	
7/9	752	228(4)	160	262	1,037	371	138(1)	269	32	486(51)	699	2,179(2)	114	2,610(4)	99	23	
8/9	752	250(22)	160	262	1,038(1)	371	138	269	33(1)	548(62)	699	2,188(9)	114	2,615(5)	99	23	
9/9	752	266(16)	160	262	1,039(1)	371	138	269	33	552(4)	700(1)	2,189(1)	114	2,616(1)	99	23	
10/9	752	270(4)	160	262	1,039	371	138	269	33	592(40)	700	2,190(1)	114	2,616	99	23	
11/9	752	284(14)	160	262	1,039	371	138	269	33	759(167)	700	2,191(1)	114	2,616	99	23	
12/9	752	289(5)	160	262	1,039	371	138	269	33	808(49)	700	2,193(2)	114	2,618(2)	99	23	
13/9	752	303(14)	160	262	1,039	371	138	269	33	839(31)	700	2,194(1)	114	2,619(1)	99	23	
14/9	752	304(1)	160	262	1,043(4)	371	138	269	33	864(25)	700	2,194	114	2,620(1)	99	23	
15/9	752	304	160	262	1,043	371	138	269	33	877(13)	700	2,199(5)	114	2,625(5)	99	23	
16/9	752	305(1)	160	262	1,043	371	139(1)	269	33	937(60)	700	2,199	114	2,625	99	23	
17/9	752	312(7)	160	262	1,043	371	141(2)	269	33	945(8)	701(1)	2,202(3)	114	2,625	99	23	
18/9	752	312	160	262	1,044(1)	371	141	269	33	1,036(91)	701	2,205(3)	114	2,625	99	23	
19/9	752	321(9)	160	262	1,044	371	141	269	33	1,044(8)	701	2,206(1)	114	2,627(2)	99	23	
20/9	752	324(3)	160	262	1,044	371	142(1)	269	33	1,080(36)	701	2,210(4)	114	2,633(6)	99	25(2)	
21/9	752	325(1)	160	262	1,044	371	142	269	33	1,129(49)	701	2,214(4)	114	2,636(3)	99	25	
22/9	752	335(10)	160	262	1,044	371	142	269	33	1,189(60)	703(2)	2,215(1)	114	2,645(9)	99	25	
23/9	752	340(5)	161(1)	262	1,044	371	142	269	33	1,323(134)	703	2,217(2)	114	2,650(5)	99	25	
24/9	753(1)	344(4)	161	262	1,044	371	142	269	33	1,386(63)	703	2,220(3)	114	2,650	99	25	
25/9	754(1)	352(8)	161	262	1,044	372(1)	142	269	33	1,483(97)	703	2,222(2)	114	2,652(2)	99	25	
26/9	755(1)	352	161	263(1)	1,047(3)	373(1)	142	269	33	1,547(64)	704(1)	2,224(2)	116(2)	2,658(6)	99	26(1)	
27/9	757(2)	352	161	264(1)	1,047	377(4)	142	269	33	1,671(124)	706(2)	2,235(11)	116	2,664(6)	99	26	
28/9	757	353(1)	161	265(1)	1,048(1)	377	142	269	33	1,769(98)	706	2,246(11)	117(1)	2,665(1)	99	27(1)	
29/9	759(2)	354(1)	162(1)	266(1)	1,048	377	143(1)	270(1)	34(1)	1,842(73)	709(3)	2,261(15)	117	2,666(1)	100(1)	27	
30/9	767(8)	367(13)	164(2)	266	1,049(1)	379(2)	144(1)	271(1)	36(2)	1,877(35)	713(4)	2,271(10)	120(3)	2,672(6)	100	28(1)	
1/10	772(5)	465(98)	164	267(1)	1,049	380(1)	145(1)	271	38(2)	1,995(118)	713	2,284(13)	122(2)	2,686(14)	105(5)	28	
2/10	773(1)	594(129)	166(2)	267	1,051(2)	381(1)	145	274(3)	38	2,108(113)	713	2,315(31)	125(3)	2,687(1)	105	29(1)	
3/10	777(4)	696(102)	168(2)	267	1,052(1)	381	148(3)	274	38	2,263(155)	716(3)	2,347(32)	134(9)	2,691(4)	107(2)	29	
4/10	785(8)	809(113)	169(1)	267	1,054(2)	381	149(1)	276(2)	38	2,389(126)	717(1)	2,378(31)	134	2,694(3)	107	34(5)	
5/10	787(2)	1,050(241)	170(1)	268(1)	1,055(1)	382(1)	149	278(2)	38	2,519(130)	718(1)	2,412(34)	139(5)	2,701(7)	109(2)	38(4)	
6/10	793(6)	1,447(397)	170	268	1,062(7)	382	152(3)	286(8)	38	2,738(219)	721(3)	2,451(39)	140(1)	2,707(6)	110(1)	39(1)	
7/10	799(6)	1,600(153)	171(1)	268	1,063(1)	384(2)	159(7)	290(4)	38	3,020(282)	724(3)	2,471(20)	144(4)	2,711(4)	112(2)	39	
8/10	804(5)	1,616(16)	171	269(1)	1,065(2)	385(1)	160(1)	295(5)	38	3,291(271)	732(8)	2,507(36)	149(5)	2,723(12)	114(2)	49(10)	
9/10	809(5)	1,626(10)	171	269	1,069(4)	385	168(8)	296(1)	38	3,565(274)	742(10)	2,531(24)	154(5)	2,733(10)	116(2)	50(1)	
10/10	811(2)	1,653(27)	171	270(1)	1,069	385	171(3)	298(2)	38	3,842(277)	751(9)	2,575(44)	154	2,739(6)	117(1)	52(2)	
11/10	814(3)	1,669(16)	171	273(3)	1,069	385	172(1)	299(1)	38	4,330(488)	751	2,601(26)	157(3)	2,754(15)	117	57(5)	
12/10	816(2)	1,679(10)	171	274(1)	1,081(12)	385	313(141)	303(4)	38	4,621(291)	752(1)	2,670(69)	157	2,782(28)	119(2)	59(2)	
13/10	826(10)	1,739(60)	171	274	1,083(2)	386(1)	336(23)	319(16)	38	5,064(443)	752	2,746(76)	157	2,792(10)	119	78(19)	
14/10	829(3)	1,852(113)	171	276(2)	1,084(1)	386	353(17)	322(3)	38	5,493(429)	755(3)	2,814(68)	157	2,804(12)	120(1)	86(8)	
15/10	829	1,883(31)	173(2)	278(2)	1,095(11)	386	369(16)	374(52)	38	5,797(304)	759(4)	2,964(150)	157	2,814(10)	121(1)	92(6)	
16/10	834(5)	1,890(7)	173	281(3)	1,096(1)	387(1)	402(33)	383(9)	38	6,286(489)	759	3,014(50)	157	2,824(10)	123(2)	111(19)	
17/10	836(2)	1,928(38)	173	282(1)	1,097(1)	387	591(189)	387(4)	38	6,737(451)	763(4)	3,173(159)	160(3)	2,839(15)	125(2)	111	
18/10	837(1)	1,937(9)	173	283(1)	1,100(3)	387	636(45)	397(10)	38	7,439(702)	768(5)	3,250(77)	162(2)	2,846(7)	125	120(9)	
19/10	839(2)	1,940(3)	173	299(16)	1,104(4)	388(1)	662(26)	415(18)	38	8,082(643)	768	3,357(107)	163(1)	2,853(7)	128(3)	154(34)	
20/10	840(1)	1,957(17)	174(1)	299	1,110(6)	388	670(8)	424(9)	38	8,755(673)	769(1)	3,489(132)	163	2,860(7)	129(1)	160(6)	
21/10	840	1,964(7)	175(1)	302(3)	1,119(9)	389(1)	682(12)	431(7)	38	9,290(535)	769	3,605(116)	163	2,886(26)	135(6)	169(9)	
22/10	841(1)	1,967(3)	178(3)	305(3)	1,157(38)	391(2)	692(10)	445(14)	38	9,868(578)	770(1)	3,742(137)	164(1)	2,909(23)	139(4)	198(29)	
23/10	845(4)	1,968(1)	178	305	1,194(37)	392(1)	731(39)	449(4)	38	10,396(528)	772(2)	3,804(62)	166(2)	2,920(11)	139	217(19)	
24/10	852(7)	2,044(76)	178	308(3)	1,290(96)	392	754(23)	459(10)	38	11,285(889)	780(8)	3,880(76)	166	2,939(19)	139	238(21)	
25/10	867(15)	2,045(1)	179(1)	308	1,312(22)	392	851(97)	465(6)	38	11,818(533)	796(16)	3,968(88)	173(7)	2,949(10)	140(1)	264(26)	
26/10	871(4)	2,048(3)	179	310(2)	1,337(25)	392	912(61)	473(8)	38	12,745(927)	803(7)	4,145(177)	176(3)	2,966(17)	140	270(6)	
27/10	879(8)	2,052(4)	179	310	1,492(155)	392	925(13)	484(11)	38	13,155(410)	819(16)	4,271(126)	180(4)	2,977(11)	141(1)	346(76)	
28/10	887(8)	2,080(28)	179	310	1,516(24)	392	944(19)	490(6)	38	13,701(546)	846(27)	4,360(89)	191(11)	2,991(14)	141	375(29)	
29/10	897(10)	2,117(37)	179	311(1)	1,559(43)	393(1)	957(13)	495(5)	38	14,053(352)	856(10)	4,495(135)	192(1)	3,014(23)	142(1)	392(17)	
30/10	906(9)	2,122(5)	179	311	1,582(23)	393	992(35)	505(10)	38	14,519(466)	872(16)	4,645(150)	192	3,033(19)	143(1)	457(65)	
31/10	906	2,124(2)	180(1)	311	1,607(25)	394(1)	994(2)	511(6)	38	15,048(529)	881(9)	4,700(55)	194(2)	3,044(11)	147(4)	469(12)	
1/11	907(1)	2,125(1)	180	312(1)	1,615(8)	394	1,017(23)	516(5)	38	15,692(644)	892(11)	4,925(225)	209(15)	3,048(4)	148(1)	487(18)	
2/11	916(9)	2,128(3)	182(2)	312	1,631(16)	395(1)	1,038(21)	519(3)	38	16,195(503)	906(14)	5,054(129)	209	3,070(22)	154(6)	592(105)	
3/11	917(1)	2,140(12)	182	313(1)	1,702(71)	395	1,073(35)	522(3)	38	16,873(678)	927(21)	5,179(125)	210(1)	3,092(22)	157(3)	673(81)	
4/11	919(2)	2,165(25)	184(2)	313	1,746(44)	395	1,096(23)	528(6)	38	17,519(646)	936(9)	5,410(231)	213(3)	3,101(9)	161(4)	701(28)	
5/11	921(2)	2,172(7)	184	318(5)	1,836(90)	395	1,132(36)	534(6)	38	18,083(564)	942(6)	5,590(180)	213	3,118(17)	162(1)	796(95)	
6/11	925(4)	2,191(19)	184	320(2)	1,881(45)	395	1,324(192)	552(18)	38	19,282(1,199)	960(18)	5,754(164)	221(8)	3,136(18)	171(9)	855(59)	
7/11	930(5)	2,206(15)	184	322(2)	1,949(68)	395	1,342(18)	589(37)	38	19,898(616)	985(25)	6,001(247)	224(3)	3,164(28)	171	959(104)	
8/11	931(1)	2,209(3)	186(2)	327(5)	2,053(104)	395	1,360(18)	596(7)	38	20,422(524)	987(2)	6,149(148)	225(1)	3,175(11)	173(2)	983(24)	
9/11	941(10)	2,217(8)	188(2)	332(5)	2,313(260)	395	1,394(34)	647(51)	38	20,792(370)	991(4)	6,287(138)	225	3,197(22)	178(5)	1,046(63)	
10/11	949(8)	2,220(3)	197(9)	332	2,454(141)	395	1,421(27)	659(12)	38	21,189(397)	997(6)	6,523(236)	225	3,216(19)	181(3)	1,054(8)	
11/11	959(10)	2,237(17)	198(1)	338(6)	2,679(225)	395	1,447(26)	673(14)	40(2)	21,448(259)	1,011(14)	6,701(178)	225	3,237(21)	184(3)	1,100(46)	
12/11	967(8)	2,240(3)	200(2)	346(8)	2,919(240)	395	1,510(63)	682(9)	40	21,767(319)	1,019(8)	6,875(174)	225	3,286(49)	185(1)	1,135(35)	
13/11	970(3)	2,245(5)	205(5)	359(13)	3,002(83)	395	1,552(42)	695(13)	40	22,323(556)	1,032(13)	7,239(364)	225	3,488(202)	186(1)	1,139(4)	
14/11	985(15)	2,255(10)	210(5)	365(6)	3,373(371)	395	1,586(34)	748(53)	40	22,714(391)	1,036(4)	7,439(200)	225	3,501(13)	190(4)	1,147(8)	
15/11	994(9)	2,263(8)	211(1)	367(2)	3,421(48)	395	1,628(42)	769(21)	41(1)	23,095(381)	1,040(4)	7,624(185)	225	3,976(475)	191(1)	1,177(30)	
16/11	1,002(8)	2,273(10)	218(7)	368(1)	3,511(90)	395	1,654(26)	885(116)	41	23,383(288)	1,041(1)	7,775(151)	229(4)	4,368(392)	192(1)	1,185(8)	
17/11	1,016(14)	2,281(8)	237(19)	370(2)	3,578(67)	395	1,687(33)	932(47)	41	23,882(499)	1,042(1)	8,046(271)	230(1)	4,613(245)	194(2)	1,186(1)	
18/11	1,019(3)	2,292(11)	240(3)	374(4)	3,609(31)	395	1,703(16)	948(16)	41	24,269(387)	1,045(3)	8,187(141)	230	4,644(31)	195(1)	1,199(13)	
19/11	1,034(15)	2,299(7)	257(17)	375(1)	3,641(32)	395	1,711(8)	996(48)	41	24,929(660)	1,053(8)	8,594(407)	230	4,716(72)	195	1,214(15)	
20/11	1,043(9)	2,318(19)	264(7)	377(2)	3,794(153)	395	1,736(25)	1,020(24)	41	25,441(512)	1,055(2)	8,747(153)	234(4)	4,762(46)	196(1)	1,215(1)	
21/11	1,076(33)	2,324(6)	271(7)	377	3,915(121)	395	1,753(17)	1,049(29)	41	25,787(346)	1,055	9,149(402)	234	4,830(68)	196	1,227(12)	
22/11	1,085(9)	2,340(16)	279(8)	382(5)	3,944(29)	395	1,768(15)	1,104(55)	42(1)	26,098(311)	1,055	9,752(603)	234	4,860(30)	197(1)	1,240(13)	
23/11	1,100(15)	2,376(36)	288(9)	382	3,985(41)	395	1,780(12)	1,185(81)	43(1)	26,387(289)	1,055	10,955(1,203)	234	5,056(196)	198(1)	1,240	
24/11	1,119(19)	2,390(14)	294(6)	384(2)	4,058(73)	395	1,795(15)	1,297(112)	43	26,619(232)	1,056(1)	12,578(1,623)	234	5,146(90)	198	1,241(1)	
25/11	1,149(30)	2,414(24)	302(8)	385(1)	4,376(318)	397(2)	1,809(14)	1,377(80)	43	26,912(293)	1,058(2)	12,693(115)	235(1)	5,190(44)	199(1)	1,278(37)	
26/11	1,209(60)	2,438(24)	330(28)	385	4,534(158)	397	1,826(17)	1,456(79)	43	27,238(326)	1,062(4)	12,854(161)	236(1)	5,249(59)	204(5)	1,291(13)	
27/11	1,242(33)	2,463(25)	335(5)	385	4,701(167)	400(3)	1,890(64)	1,498(42)	43	27,679(441)	1,062	13,029(175)	236	5,403(154)	204	1,291	
28/11	1,288(46)	2,480(17)	353(18)	386(1)	4,742(41)	400	1,982(92)	1,665(167)	43	28,155(476)	1,062	13,295(266)	236	5,594(191)	204	1,291	
29/11	1,325(37)	2,532(52)	359(6)	387(1)	4,774(32)	401(1)	2,028(46)	1,742(77)	43	28,445(290)	1,062	13,533(238)	237(1)	6,087(493)	204	1,326(35)	
30/11	1,379(54)	2,563(31)	360(1)	387	4,915(141)	403(2)	2,088(60)	1,785(43)	43	28,771(326)	1,064(2)	13,935(402)	237	6,206(119)	205(1)	1,356(30)	
Date	JH	KD	KE	ML	NS	PH	PG	PK	PR	SB	SR	SE	TR	KL	PT	LB	Source

=== List of death cases ===
Details of the confirmed death cases in Malaysia
Case Number		Date of death	Nationality	Gender	Age	Hospitalised Location	Patient Data	Source
1	178	17 March 2020	Malaysia	Male	34	Permai Hospital	Part of the religious gathering cluster. Started to have fever on 5 March 2020.	
2	358	17 March 2020	Malaysia	Male	60	Sarawak General Hospital	Had chronic illness. Showed symptoms of fever, coughing and shortness of breath on 7 March 2020.	
3	152	20 March 2020	Malaysia	Male	58	Tawau Hospital	Part of the religious gathering cluster. Hospitalised on 9 March 2020 after showing severe acute respiratory infection (SARI) symptoms.	
4	238	21 March 2020	Malaysia	Male	50	Malacca General Hospital	Part of the religious gathering cluster. Hospitalised on 12 March 2020 after showing SARI symptoms.	
5	1031	18 March 2020	Malaysia	Female	79	Borneo Medical Centre	Hospitalised after experiencing fever and coughing for five days. Had contact with two other positive cases, her son and daughter.	
6	1032	21 March 2020	Malaysia	Female	40	Sarawak General Hospital	Daughter to case number 1031 (fifth death case). Hospitalised on 7 March 2020 after showing symptoms of fever and coughing.	
7	290	21 March 2020	Malaysia	Male	57	Kuala Lumpur Hospital	Had a travel history to Vietnam and had contact with a positive case from the religious gathering cluster.	
8	781	21 March 2020	Malaysia	Male	69	Tumpat Hospital	Part of the religious gathering cluster. Hospitalised on 16 March 2020 after having fever since 12 March 2020.	
9	890	22 March 2020	Malaysia	Male	48	Tuanku Fauziah Hospital	A medical doctor in the Ministry of Health who had a travel history to Turkey. Experienced SARI symptoms and was ventilated when his situation deteriorated on 19 March 2020.	
10	259	22 March 2020	Malaysia	Male	74	Penang General Hospital	Part of the religious gathering cluster. Hospitalised on 13 March 2020 after showing symptoms since 8 March 2020.	
11	1070	22 March 2020	Malaysia	Male	70	Canselor Tuanku Muhriz UKM Hospital	Had chronic illness and a travel history to Indonesia. Hospitalised on 18 March 2020.	
12	1114	23 March 2020	Malaysia	Male	70	Enche' Besar Hajjah Khalsom Hospital	Part of the religious gathering cluster.	
13	1006	23 March 2020	Malaysia	Male	49	Sarawak General Hospital	Son to case number 1031 (fifth death case).	
14	595	23 March 2020	Malaysia	Female	51	Miri Hospital	Close contact of a positive case from the religious gathering cluster.	
15	1519	24 March 2020	Malaysia	Male	71	Sultanah Fatimah Specialist Hospital	Believed to have had close contact with a patient from the religious gathering cluster. Had chronic illness. Hospitalised on 18 March 2020.	
16	1334	24 March 2020	Malaysia	Male	75	Kuala Lumpur Hospital	Had chronic illness. Hospitalised on 16 March 2020.	
17	1251	25 March 2020	Malaysia	Male	66	Sultanah Fatimah Specialist Hospital	Believed to have had contact with a positive case. Had chronic illness. Hospitalised on 20 March 2020.	
18	1625	23 March 2020	Malaysia	Male	56	Sultan Ismail Hospital	Had chronic illness. Hospitalised on 20 March 2020.	
19	1246	25 March 2020	Malaysia	Female	68	Sultanah Nora Ismail Hospital	Hospitalised on 19 March 2020.	
20	780	25 March 2020	Malaysia	Male	76	Sultan Ismail Petra Hospital	Part of the religious gathering cluster. Hospitalised on 18 March 2020.	
21	1588	26 March 2020	Malaysia	Male	63	Sultanah Bahiyah Hospital	Part of the religious gathering cluster. Had chronic illness. Hospitalised on 23 March 2020.	
22	1797	23 March 2020	Malaysia	Male	48	Enche' Besar Hajjah Khalsom Hospital	Part of the religious gathering cluster. Had chronic illness.	
23	1840	25 March 2020	Malaysia	Male	62	Raja Permaisuri Bainun Hospital	Had chronic illness. Hospitalised on 23 March 2020.	
24	1056	26 March 2020	Malaysia	Male	35	Kuala Lumpur Hospital	Had a travel history to Indonesia. Hospitalised on 18 March 2020.	
25	2032	26 March 2020	Malaysia	Male	83	Raja Permaisuri Bainun Hospital	Had chronic illness. Hospitalised on 25 March 2020.	
26	1321	27 March 2020	Malaysia	Male	53	Sungai Buloh Hospital	Close contact of a positive case. Hospitalised on 22 March 2020.	
27	2162	28 March 2020	Malaysia	Male	61	Sultanah Fatimah Specialist Hospital	Had chronic illness. Hospitalised on 24 March 2020.	
28	2321	28 March 2020	Malaysia	Female	91	University Malaya Medical Centre	Had chronic illness. Hospitalised on 26 March 2020.	
29	2123	28 March 2020	Malaysia	Female	64	Tuanku Ja'afar Hospital	Had chronic illness. Hospitalised on 25 March 2020.	
30	2322	28 March 2020	Malaysia	Male	76	University Malaya Medical Centre	Had chronic illness.	
31	2323	28 March 2020	Malaysia	Male	27	Raja Permaisuri Bainun Hospital	Had chronic illness. Hospitalised on 27 March 2020.	
32	1239	28 March 2020	Malaysia	Male	50	Enche' Besar Hajjah Khalsom Hospital	Part of the religious gathering cluster. Had chronic illness. Hospitalised on 22 March 2020.	
33	1249	28 March 2020	Malaysia	Male	37	Permai Hospital	Had a travel history to India. Hospitalised on 21 March 2020.	
34	787	29 March 2020	Malaysia	Male	77	Kuala Lumpur Hospital	Had chronic illness. Hospitalised on 18 March 2020.	
35	1952	29 March 2020	Malaysia	Female	57	Sungai Buloh Hospital	Had chronic illness and a travel history to Indonesia.	
36	1941	30 March 2020	Malaysia	Male	47	Sarawak General Hospital	Hospitalised on 23 March 2020.	
37	2471	30 March 2020	Malaysia	Female	46	Miri Hospital	Had chronic illness.	
38	2269	30 March 2020	Malaysia	Female	48	Tuanku Ja'afar Hospital	Close contact of a positive case. Had chronic illness. Hospitalised on 25 March 2020.	
39	2626	27 March 2020	Malaysia	Male	69	Kuala Lumpur Hospital	Had chronic illness and a travel history to Saudi Arabia. Passed away at home and body was brought to the Kuala Lumpur Hospital.	
40	2627	26 March 2020	Malaysia	Male	69	Enche' Besar Hajjah Khalsom Hospital	Had chronic illness.	
41	1275	31 March 2020	Indonesia	Male	40	Sarawak General Hospital	Hospitalised on 20 March 2020.	
42	2628	31 March 2020	Malaysia	Male	81	University Malaya Medical Centre	Had chronic illness. Hospitalised on 27 March 2020.	
43	2629	30 March 2020	Malaysia	Male	73	Tengku Ampuan Rahimah Hospital	Had chronic illness. Hospitalised on 29 March 2020.	
44	193	31 March 2020	Malaysia	Female	80	Kuala Lumpur Hospital	Close contact of a positive case. Had chronic illness. Hospitalised on 13 March 2020.	
45	1053	31 March 2020	Malaysia	Male	62	Kuala Lumpur Hospital	Close contact of a positive case. Had chronic illness. Hospitalised on 17 March 2020.	
46	2909	31 March 2020	Malaysia	Male	37	Sultanah Aminah Hospital	Had chronic illness. Hospitalised on 28 March 2020.	
47	2910	29 March 2020	Malaysia	Male	78	Sultanah Fatimah Specialist Hospital	Had chronic illness. Hospitalised on 17 March 2020.	
48	2572	2 April 2020	Malaysia	Male	85	Enche' Besar Hajjah Khalsom Hospital	Had chronic illness. Hospitalised on 29 March 2020.	
49	1273	1 April 2020	Malaysia	Male	61	Sarawak General Hospital	Close contact of a positive case. Hospitalised on 20 March 2020.	
50	1767	2 April 2020	Malaysia	Male	69	Tuanku Ja'afar Hospital	Hospitalised on 22 March 2020.	
51	2561	2 April 2020	Malaysia	Female	84	National Heart Institute	Had chronic illness. Hospitalised on 12 March 2020.	
52	2122	3 April 2020	Malaysia	Male	52	Tuanku Ja'afar Hospital	Hospitalised on 18 March 2020.	
53	2034	3 April 2020	Malaysia	Female	73	Raja Permaisuri Bainun Hospital	Had chronic illness. Hospitalised on 24 March 2020.	
54	2149	28 March 2020	Malaysia	Female	85	National Heart Institute	Had chronic illness. Hospitalised on 23 March 2020.	
55	860	3 April 2020	Malaysia	Female	66	Sultan Ismail Petra Hospital	Had chronic illness. Hospitalised on 18 March 2020.	
56	2850	3 April 2020	Malaysia	Male	56	Sarawak General Hospital	Close contact of case number 1031 (fifth death case). Had chronic illness. Hospitalised on 30 March 2020.	
57	1575	3 April 2020	Malaysia	Male	61	Tengku Ampuan Afzan Hospital	Had chronic illness. Hospitalised on 23 March 2020.	
58	2210	4 April 2020	Malaysia	Male	72	Sarawak General Hospital	Close contact of case number 1031 (fifth death case). Had chronic illness. Hospitalised on 27 March 2020.	
59	3484	4 April 2020	Malaysia	Male	68	Kuala Lumpur Hospital	Had chronic illness. Hospitalised on 27 March 2020.	
60	3073	5 April 2020	Malaysia	Male	53	Sarawak General Hospital	Hospitalised on 31 March 2020.	
61	2200	4 April 2020	Malaysia	Male	66	Keningau Hospital	Had chronic illness. Hospitalised on 26 March 2020.	
62	3663	5 April 2020	Malaysia	Male	67	Sultanah Nur Zahirah Hospital	Close contact of five positive cases from the religious gathering cluster. Had chronic illness. Hospitalised on 29 March 2020.	
63	3794	6 April 2020	Malaysia	Male	71	Enche' Besar Hajjah Khalsom Hospital	Went to the religious gathering event held in Sulawesi, Indonesia. Hospitalised on 5 April 2020.	
64	2903	7 April 2020	Malaysia	Female	58	Tuanku Ja'afar Hospital	Had chronic illness. Hospitalised on 30 March 2020.	
65	1906	8 April 2020	Pakistan	Male	69	Kuala Lumpur Hospital	Part of the religious gathering cluster. Had chronic illness. Hospitalised on 22 March 2020.	
66	2798	9 April 2020	Malaysia	Male	59	Malacca General Hospital	Part of the religious gathering cluster. Had chronic illness. Hospitalised on 31 March 2020.	
67	2864	9 April 2020	Malaysia	Female	23	Sarawak General Hospital	Close contact of two positive cases. Had chronic illness. Hospitalised on 30 March 2020.	
68	694	10 April 2020	Malaysia	Male	62	Queen Elizabeth Hospital	Close contact of a positive case from the religious gathering cluster. Had chronic illness. Hospitalised on 17 March 2020.	
69	4229	10 April 2020	Malaysia	Male	77	Kuala Lumpur Hospital	Had chronic illness. Hospitalised on 27 March 2020.	
70	4230	10 April 2020	Malaysia	Female	88	University Malaya Medical Centre	Close contact of a positive case. Had chronic illness. Hospitalised on 20 March 2020.	
71	3091	11 April 2020	Malaysia	Male	66	Tuanku Ja'afar Hospital	Close contact of a positive case from the religious gathering cluster. Had chronic illness. Hospitalised on 1 April 2020.	
72	537	11 April 2020	Malaysia	Male	71	Sungai Buloh Hospital	Had chronic illness. Hospitalised on 15 March 2020.	
73	2399	11 April 2020	Malaysia	Male	63	Raja Permaisuri Bainun Hospital	Had chronic illness. Hospitalised on 25 March 2020.	
74	4531	12 April 2020	Malaysia	Male	54	Tuanku Ja'afar Hospital	Had chronic illness. Hospitalised on 11 April 2020.	
75	3469	12 April 2020	Malaysia	Male	90	Taiping Hospital	Had chronic illness. Hospitalised on 1 April 2020.	
76	4314	12 April 2020	Malaysia	Female	47	Sarawak General Hospital	Had chronic illness. Hospitalised on 8 April 2020.	
77	2797	13 April 2020	Malaysia	Male	62	Malacca General Hospital	Had chronic illness. Hospitalised on 31 March 2020.	
78	4532	6 April 2020	Non-Malaysian	Male	26	N/A	Found dead at Pulau Gaya on 6 April 2020. Confirmed to be positive on 11 April 2020. Undocumented, believed to be a foreigner and under investigation by Royal Malaysian Police.	
79	2052	14 April 2020	Malaysia	Male	65	Sungai Buloh Hospital	Had chronic illness. Hospitalised on 27 March 2020.	
80	4818	12 April 2020	Malaysia	Male	63	Kuala Lumpur Hospital	Had chronic illness. Hospitalised on 7 April 2020.	
81	4521	13 April 2020	Malaysia	Female	74	Malacca General Hospital	Close contact of a positive case from the religious gathering cluster. Had chronic illness. Hospitalised on 9 April 2020.	
82	1649	14 April 2020	Malaysia	Male	81	Enche' Besar Hajjah Khalsom Hospital	Close contact of a positive case from the religious gathering cluster. Had chronic illness. Hospitalised on 26 March 2020.	
83	4988	15 April 2020	Malaysia	Male	69	University Malaya Medical Centre	Had chronic illness. Hospitalised on 21 March 2020.	
84	4711	15 April 2020	Malaysia	Male	66	Kuala Lumpur Hospital	Had chronic illness. Hospitalised on 9 April 2020.	
85	5064	16 April 2020	Malaysia	Male	85	Tengku Ampuan Afzan Hospital	Close contact of a positive case. Had haematological malignancy. Hospitalised on 15 April 2020.	
86	5183	16 April 2020	Malaysia	Male	85	University Malaya Medical Centre	Close contact of case number 2321 (28th death case). Had chronic illness. Hospitalised on 1 April 2020.	
87	2657	12 April 2020	Malaysia	Male	60	Kuala Lumpur Hospital	Had chronic illness. Hospitalised on 30 March 2020.	
88	5252	17 April 2020	Myanmar	Male	36	Selayang Hospital	Hospitalised on 17 April 2020 with late-stage SARI.	
89	4769	18 April 2020	Malaysia	Male	51	Enche' Besar Hajjah Khalsom Hospital	Close contact of a positive case. Had chronic illness. Hospitalised on 13 April 2020.	
90	2050	20 April 2020	Malaysia	Female	72	Sungai Buloh Hospital	Mother to a positive case. Had chronic illness. Hospitalised on 27 March 2020.	
91	4090	21 April 2020	Malaysia	Male	69	Sarawak General Hospital	Had chronic illness. Hospitalised on 6 April 2020.	
92	5332	21 April 2020	Malaysia	Male	92	Kuala Lumpur Hospital	Close contact of case number 4711 (84th death case). Had chronic illness. Hospitalised on 8 April 2020.	
93	5483	22 April 2020	Malaysia	Female	72	Sarawak General Hospital	Had chronic illness. Hospitalised on 20 April 2020.	
94	3871	23 April 2020	Malaysia	Female	32	Enche' Besar Hajjah Khalsom Hospital	A healthcare worker in the Ministry of Health who was a close contact of a positive case. Had chronic illness. Hospitalised on 6 April 2020.	
95	4129	22 April 2020	Malaysia	Male	67	Tengku Ampuan Afzan Hospital	Close contact of case number 1575 (57th death case). Had chronic illness. Hospitalised on 8 April 2020.	
96	2978	24 April 2020	Malaysia	Male	61	Sungai Buloh Hospital	Close contact of a positive case. Had chronic illness. Hospitalised on 31 March 2020.	
97	2354	25 April 2020	Malaysia	Male	62	Sungai Buloh Hospital	Had chronic illness. Hospitalised on 28 March 2020.	
98	2806	24 April 2020	Malaysia	Female	62	Kuala Lumpur Hospital	Mother to a positive case. Had chronic illness. Hospitalised on 22 March 2020.	
99	4087	27 April 2020	Malaysia	Male	78	Enche' Besar Hajjah Khalsom Hospital	Had chronic illness. Hospitalised on 7 April 2020.	
100	3628	28 April 2020	Malaysia	Male	67	Sungai Buloh Hospital	Had chronic illness. Hospitalised on 4 April 2020.	
101	4657	29 April 2020	Malaysia	Male	64	Tengku Ampuan Afzan Hospital	Close contact of a positive case. Had haematological malignancy. Hospitalised on 12 April 2020.	
102	5282	30 April 2020	Malaysia	Male	72	Sarawak General Hospital	Had chronic illness. Hospitalised on 16 April 2020.	
103	5441	30 April 2020	Malaysia	Male	66	Kuala Lumpur Hospital	Close contact of case number 4818 (80th death case). Had cancer. Hospitalised on 14 April 2020.	
104	5539	2 May 2020	Malaysia	Male	82	Sungai Buloh Hospital	Had chronic illness. Hospitalised on 22 April 2020.	
105	5837	3 May 2020	Malaysia	Male	64	Tuanku Ja'afar Hospital	Had chronic illness. Hospitalised on 27 April 2020.	
106	830	5 May 2020	Malaysia	Male	47	Sungai Buloh Hospital	Hospitalised on 15 March 2020.	
107	2380	5 May 2020	Malaysia	Male	51	Sungai Buloh Hospital	Had chronic illness. Hospitalised on 22 April 2020.	
108	2499	8 May 2020	Malaysia	Female	74	Malacca General Hospital	Close contact of a positive case from the religious gathering cluster. Had chronic illness. Hospitalised on 29 March 2020.	
109	6657	10 May 2020	Malaysia	Male	63	Kuala Lumpur Hospital	Had chronic illness. Hospitalised on 8 May 2020.	
110	6743	Unspecified	Malaysia	Male	30	N/A	Found dead at Rompin. Confirmed to be positive on 12 May 2020. Under investigation by Royal Malaysian Police and the Rompin District Health Office.	
111	5195	13 May 2020	Malaysia	Male	90	Enche' Besar Hajjah Khalsom Hospital	Had chronic illness. Hospitalised on 16 April 2020.	
112	6780	12 May 2020	Malaysia	Male	39	Tengku Ampuan Afzan Hospital	Had valvular heart disease and limited mobility due to an accident.	
113	6856	7 May 2020	Malaysia	Female	53	Likas Women and Children's Hospital	A healthcare worker in the Ministry of Health. Had chronic illness. Hospitalised on 5 May 2020.	
114	6942	18 May 2020	Malaysia	Female	77	Pahang Hospital (Unspecified)	Had chronic illness.	
115	3616	21 May 2020	Malaysia	Male	65	Sungai Buloh Hospital	Had chronic illness. Hospitalised on 3 April 2020.	
116	7733	4 June 2020	Malaysia	Male	61	Enche' Besar Hajjah Khalsom Hospital	Had chronic illness. Hospitalised on 29 May 2020.	
117	2296	5 June 2020	Malaysia	Female	79	Sungai Buloh Hospital	Hospitalised on 26 March 2020.	
118	824	10 June 2020	Malaysia	Male	61	Sungai Buloh Hospital	Part of the religious gathering cluster. Had chronic illness. Hospitalised on 15 March 2020.	
119	8370	11 June 2020	Malaysia	Female	85	Keningau Hospital	Passed away at home and body was brought to the Keningau Hospital.	
120	8403	12 June 2020	Malaysia	Female	96	Queen Elizabeth Hospital	Passed away at home and body was brought to the Queen Elizabeth Hospital.	
121	7468	12 June 2020	India	Male	67	Canselor Tuanku Muhriz UKM Hospital	Had chronic illness. Found unconscious in the Bukit Jalil Immigration Detention Depot.	
122	8702	10 July 2020	Malaysia	Male	72	Sarawak General Hospital	Had chronic illness.	
123	8770	17 July 2020	Malaysia	Male	72	Enche' Besar Hajjah Khalsom Hospital	Had chronic illness.	
124	8743	26 July 2020	Malaysia	Female	63	Sarawak General Hospital	Had chronic illness. Hospitalised on 9 July 2020.	
125	8974	29 July 2020	Philippines	Male	64	Queen Elizabeth Hospital	Had chronic illness.	
126	9290	29 August 2020	Malaysia	Male	75	Sultanah Bahiyah Hospital	Had chronic illness. Hospitalised on 24 August 2020.	
127	9124	30 August 2020	Malaysia	Male	62	Sultanah Bahiyah Hospital	Had chronic illness. Hospitalised on 13 August 2020.	
128	9174	1 September 2020	Malaysia	Female	80	Penang General Hospital	Had chronic illness. Hospitalised on 14 August 2020.	
129	10145	14 September 2020	Philippines	Female	50	Semporna Hospital	Hospitalised on 14 September 2020.	
130	9578	18 September 2020	Malaysia	Male	82	Sultanah Bahiyah Hospital	Had chronic illness. Hospitalised on 7 September 2020.	
131	10495	19 September 2020	Indonesia	Female	48	Tawau Hospital	Had chronic illness. Hospitalised on 18 September 2020.	
132	10493	22 September 2020	Malaysia	Male	54	Tawau Hospital	Hospitalised on 20 September 2020.	
133	9224	23 September 2020	Malaysia	Male	72	Sultanah Bahiyah Hospital	Close contact of case number 9124 (127th death case). Had chronic illness. Hospitalised on 19 August 2020.	
134	10491	27 September 2020	Malaysia	Female	81	Tawau Hospital	Hospitalised on 17 September 2020.	
135	11207	28 September 2020	Malaysia	Male	46	Sultanah Bahiyah Hospital	Had chronic illness. Hospitalised on 28 September 2020.	
136	11185	26 September 2020	Malaysia	Male	70	Tawau Hospital	Had terminal cancer. Passed away at home and body was brought to the Tawau Hospital. Confirmed to be positive on 29 September 2020.	
137	10939	3 October 2020	Malaysia	Male	57	Tawau Hospital	Had chronic illness. Experienced symptoms since 10 September 2020 and hospitalized in ICU on 24 September 2020.	
138	11154	4 October 2020	Malaysia	Male	60	Dunches of Kent Hospital	Hospitalized on 25 September 2020 and confirmed positive on the next day.	
139	12431	4 October 2020	Malaysia	Male	60	Semporna Hospital	Hospitalized on 1 September 2020 and found positive on 30 September 2020.	
140	12432	5 October 2020	Malaysia	Female	1	Semporna Hospital	Hospitalized on 1 October 2020 and found positive on 5 October 2020.	
141	13067	5 October 2020	Malaysia	Male	85	Penang General Hospital	Had chronic and mental illness. Lost consciousness on the morning before death.	
Starting 8 October 2020, the Ministry of Health reduced the amount of patient background information in their daily press releases.
142	12489	8 October 2020	Malaysia	Male	55	Lahad Datu Hospital	Had chronic illness (Diabetes, hypertension and dyslipidemia).	
143	13692	8 October 2020	Malaysia	Female	75	Semporna Hospital	Had chronic illness (Hypertension).	
144	13705	8 October 2020	Malaysia	Male	57	Dunches of Kent Hospital	Had chronic illness (Diabetes and hypertension).	
145	14261	8 October 2020	Malaysia	Male	82	Tawau Hospital	Undisclosed.	
146	14264	8 October 2020	Malaysia	Male	53	Tawau Hospital	Had chronic illness (Diabetes).	
147	12991	9 October 2020	Malaysia	Male	54	Tawau Hospital	Had chronic illness (Hypertension and asthma).	
148	14028	9 October 2020	Malaysia	Male	68	Semporna Hospital	Undisclosed.	
149	14515	9 October 2020	Malaysia	Female	66	Queen Elizabeth Hospital	Had chronic illness (Diabetes, hypertension and tuberculosis).	
150	14640	9 October 2020	Malaysia	Female	58	Tawau Hospital	Undisclosed.	
151	14641	9 October 2020	Malaysia	Female	57	Semporna Hospital	Had chronic illness (Hypertension).	
152	14642	9 October 2020	Malaysia	Male	64	Queen Elizabeth Hospital	Had chronic illness (Benign prostatic hyperplasia (BPH)).	
153	14038	10 October 2020	Malaysia	Male	61	Tawau Hospital	Had chronic illness (Diabetes and tuberculosis).	
154	14974	10 October 2020	Malaysia	Female	54	Queen Elizabeth Hospital	Had chronic illness (Diabetes, hypertension and obesity).	
155	14999	10 October 2020	Malaysia	Male	51	Semporna Hospital	Had chronic illness (Diabetes, hypertension and heart disease).	
156	14259	11 October 2020	Malaysia	Male	67	Dunches of Kent Hospital	Had chronic illness (Tuberculosis and heart disease).	
157	15584	11 October 2020	Malaysia	Male	63	Tawau Hospital	Had chronic illness (Diabetes and hypertension).	
158	15947	12 October 2020	Malaysia	Female	85	Tawau Hospital	Had chronic illness (Hypertension, heart disease and chronic lung disease).	
159	15948	12 October 2020	Malaysia	Female	48	Tawau Hospital	Undisclosed.	
160	16315	13 October 2020	Malaysia	Female	84	Dunches of Kent Hospital	Had chronic illness (Hypertension and dyslipidemia).	
161	16316	13 October 2020	Malaysia	Male	83	Dunches of Kent Hospital	Had chronic illness (Hypertension, diabetes and dyslipidemia).	
162	16662	13 October 2020	Non-Malaysian	Female	36	Semporna Hospital	Had chronic illness (Tuberculosis)	
163	16663	13 October 2020	Malaysia	Male	59	Tawau Hospital	Had chronic illness (Kidney disease).	
164	11152	14 October 2020	Malaysia	Male	80	Lahad Datu Hospital	Had chronic illness (Hypertension and gout).	
165	17307	14 October 2020	Malaysia	Female	63	Queen Elizabeth Hospital	Had chronic illness (Hypertension and diabetes).	
166	17308	14 October 2020	Malaysia	Female	73	Dunches of Kent Hospital	Had chronic illness (Hypertension).	
167	17309	14 October 2020	Non-Malaysian	Female	47	Dunches of Kent Hospital	Had chronic illness (Hypertension).	
168	12170	15 October 2020	Malaysia	Female	54	Queen Elizabeth Hospital	Had chronic illness (Hypertension, diabetes, heart disease and thyroid goiter).	
169	15303	15 October 2020	Non-Malaysian	Male	68	Tawau Hospital	Had chronic illness (Diabetes).	
170	13844	15 October 2020	Non-Malaysian	Female	100	Dunches of Kent Hospital	Undisclosed.	
171	11628	16 October 2020	Malaysia	Male	66	Queen Elizabeth Hospital	Had chronic illness (Hypertension, diabetes and stroke).	
172	15853	16 October 2020	Malaysia	Male	72	Dunches of Kent Hospital	Had chronic illness (Heart disease).	
173	18618	16 October 2020	Malaysia	Male	39	Semporna Hospital	Had chronic illness (Stroke).	
174	18616	16 October 2020	Malaysia	Female	74	Queen Elizabeth Hospital	Had chronic illness (Hypertension, diabetes and kidney disease).	
175	18617	16 October 2020	Malaysia	Male	67	Queen Elizabeth Hospital	Had chronic illness (Hypertension, heart disease and stroke).	
176	18676	16 October 2020	Non-Malaysian	Male	52	University Malaya Medical Centre	Had chronic illness (Diabetes, heart disease, psoriasis and spinal disease).	
177	11860	17 October 2020	Malaysia	Male	78	Queen Elizabeth Hospital	Had chronic illness (Hypertension and chronic kidney disease).	
178	14976	17 October 2020	Malaysia	Male	88	Queen Elizabeth Hospital	Had chronic illness (Hypertension, diabetes, dyslipidemia and stroke).	
179	16652	17 October 2020	Malaysia	Female	71	Tawau Hospital	Undisclosed.	
180	19209	17 October 2020	Non-Malaysian	Male	53	Dunches of Kent Hospital	Undisclosed.	
181	13525	18 October 2020	Malaysia	Male	61	Queen Elizabeth Hospital	Undisclosed.	
182	12984	18 October 2020	Malaysia	Female	70	Tawau Hospital	Had chronic illness (Hypertension).	
183	13706	18 October 2020	Malaysia	Male	57	Queen Elizabeth Hospital	Had chronic illness (Hypertension).	
184	20328	18 October 2020	Non-Malaysian	Female	55	Dunches of Kent Hospital	Had chronic illness (Hypertension).	
185	20329	18 October 2020	Non-Malaysian	Male	41	Tawau Hospital	Undisclosed.	
186	17779	18 October 2020	Malaysia	Male	44	Dunches of Kent Hospital	Had chronic illness (Heart disease, hypertension, diabetes and dyslipidemia).	
187	20401	18 October 2020	Malaysia	Female	46	University Malaya Medical Centre	Undisclosed.	
188	21139	19 October 2020	Malaysia	Male	85	Tawau Hospital	Undisclosed.	
189	21140	19 October 2020	Non-Malaysian	Male	52	Queen Elizabeth Hospital	Had chronic illness (Diabetes).	
190	21141	19 October 2020	Malaysia	Female	70	Dunches of Kent Hospital	Undisclosed.	
191	13509	20 October 2020	Malaysia	Male	78	Tawau Hospital	Had chronic illness (Hypertension, dyslipidemia and heart disease).	
192	14987	20 October 2020	Malaysia	Female	59	Tawau Hospital	Had chronic illness (Hypertension, diabetes and chronic kidney disease).	
193	22036	20 October 2020	Malaysia	Female	90	Queen Elizabeth Hospital	Had chronic illness (Hypertension and heart disease).	
194	22756	21 October 2020	Malaysia	Female	71	Semporna Hospital	Had chronic illness (Breast cancer and stroke).	
195	22757	21 October 2020	Malaysia	Male	65	Queen Elizabeth Hospital	Had chronic illness (Hypertension, diabetes, chronic hepatitis B and autoimmune disease).	
196	22758	21 October 2020	Malaysia	Male	65	Dunches of Kent Hospital	Had chronic illness (Stroke).	
197	22758	21 October 2020	Malaysia	Male	55	Dunches of Kent Hospital	Had chronic illness (Diabetes and hypertension).	
198	22760	21 October 2020	Malaysia	Male	27	Dunches of Kent Hospital	Undisclosed.	
199	22943	21 October 2020	Malaysia	Male	46	Labuan Hospital	Had chronic illness (Hypertension).	
200	15063	22 October 2020	Malaysia	Female	67	Sultanah Bahiyah Hospital	Had chronic illness (Diabetes, hypertension and dyslipidemia).	
201	11865	22 October 2020	Malaysia	Female	65	Queen Elizabeth Hospital	Undisclosed.	
202	23533	22 October 2020	Malaysia	Male	88	Dunches of Kent Hospital	Undisclosed.	
203	23534	22 October 2020	Malaysia	Male	78	Tuaran Hospital	Had chronic illness (Stroke).	
204	23535	22 October 2020	Non-Malaysian	Female	60	Dunches of Kent Hospital	Undisclosed.	
205	12154	23 October 2020	Non-Malaysian	Male	77	Queen Elizabeth Hospital	Had chronic illness (Diabetes, pancreatic cancer and dyslipidemia).	
206	14924	23 October 2020	Malaysia	Female	69	Dunches of Kent Hospital	Undisclosed.	
207	15274	23 October 2020	Malaysia	Male	54	Dunches of Kent Hospital	Had chronic illness (Diabetes, hypertension, heart disease and dyslipidemia).	
208	15306	23 October 2020	Non-Malaysian	Male	66	Dunches of Kent Hospital	Had chronic illness (Diabetes, hypertension and heart disease).	
209	24267	23 October 2020	Malaysia	Female	62	Dunches of Kent Hospital	Had chronic illness (Diabetes, hypertension, dyslipidemia, gout, heart disease and obesity).	
210	24330	23 October 2020	Malaysia	Male	63	Dunches of Kent Hospital	Had chronic illness (Hypertension and stroke).	
211	24331	23 October 2020	Malaysia	Male	61	Tuaran Hospital	Had chronic illness (Hypertension).	
212	24332	23 October 2020	Malaysia	Male	33	Likas Women and Children's Hospital	Had chronic illness (Kidney disease).	
213	18681	23 October 2020	Malaysia	Male	67	Sultanah Bahiyah Hospital	Undisclosed.	
214	24507	23 October 2020	Non-Malaysian	Female	58	Labuan Hospital	Had chronic illness (Asthma).	
215	13507	24 October 2020	Malaysia	Male	88	Tuaran Hospital	Had chronic illness (Hypertension).	
216	14008	24 October 2020	Malaysia	Male	60	Queen Elizabeth Hospital	Had chronic illness (Hypertension, asthma and gout).	
217	13690	24 October 2020	Malaysia	Male	62	Tawau Hospital	Had chronic illness (Diabetes).	
218	24324	24 October 2020	Malaysia	Male	75	Dunches of Kent Hospital	Had chronic illness (Hypertension).	
219	24323	24 October 2020	Malaysia	Male	72	Dunches of Kent Hospital	Had chronic illness (Dyslipidemia, Parkinson's disease and cataracts).	
220	25403	24 October 2020	Malaysia	Male	47	Lahad Datu Hospital	Had chronic illness (Hypertension and chronic kidney disease)	
221	25718	24 October 2020	Malaysia	Male	63	Penang General Hospital	Had chronic illness (Diabetes, hypertension, heart disease, chronic kidney disease and hydrocephalus).	
222	12863	25 October 2020	Malaysia	Male	77	Dunches of Kent Hospital	Undisclosed.	
223	15329	25 October 2020	Malaysia	Male	59	Queen Elizabeth Hospital	Undisclosed.	
224	14023	25 October 2020	Malaysia	Female	70	Lahad Datu Hospital	Had chronic illness (Diabetes).	
225	22032	25 October 2020	Malaysia	Male	58	Queen Elizabeth Hospital	Had chronic illness (Diabetes, hypertension and dyslipidemia).	
226	24224	25 October 2020	Malaysia	Male	34	Tawau Hospital	Had chronic illness (Obesity and obstructive sleep apnoea syndrome).	
227	26273	25 October 2020	Malaysia	Female	74	Tawau Hospital	Had chronic illness (Hypertension and pulmonary tuberculosis).	
228	26274	25 October 2020	Malaysia	Male	68	Dunches of Kent Hospital	Had chronic illness (Hypertension, dyslipidemia and gout).	
229	26275	25 October 2020	Malaysia	Female	80	Dunches of Kent Hospital	Undisclosed.	
230	14925	26 October 2020	Malaysia	Male	67	Dunches of Kent Hospital	Had chronic illness (Sinusitis).	
231	15854	26 October 2020	Malaysia	Male	71	Queen Elizabeth Hospital	Had chronic illness (Diabetes, hypertension and heart disease).	
232	16508	26 October 2020	Malaysia	Female	51	Queen Elizabeth Hospital	Had chronic illness (Diabetes, hypertension and dyslipidemia).	
233	26212	26 October 2020	Malaysia	Male	61	Tuaran Hospital	Had chronic illness (Blindness).	
234	25353	26 October 2020	Non-Malaysian	Male	50	Queen Elizabeth Hospital	Had chronic illness (Hypertension, chronic kidney disease and heart disease).	
235	27491	26 October 2020	Non-Malaysian	Female	90	Dunches of Kent Hospital	Undisclosed.	
236	27492	26 October 2020	Non-Malaysian	Male	27	Tawau Hospital	Undisclosed.	
237	27478	27 October 2020	Malaysia	Male	82	Tawau Hospital	Had chronic illness (Chronic obstructive pulmonary disease, chronic kidney disease and atrial fibrillation).	
238	28215	27 October 2020	Non-Malaysian	Female	53	Tawau Hospital	Undisclosed.	
239	12156	28 October 2020	Malaysia	Male	66	Queen Elizabeth Hospital	Had chronic illness (Diabetes, hypertension and dyslipidemia).	
240	14415	28 October 2020	Malaysia	Female	73	Tawau Hospital	Had chronic illness (Chronic lung disease).	
241	15287	28 October 2020	Malaysia	Female	35	Queen Elizabeth Hospital	Had chronic illness (Hypertension, asthma, dyslipidemia and stroke).	
242	29183	28 October 2020	Malaysia	Male	67	Queen Elizabeth Hospital	Had chronic illness (Heart disease and gout).	
243	29184	28 October 2020	Malaysia	Female	73	Queen Elizabeth Hospital	Undisclosed.	
244	29185	28 October 2020	Non-Malaysian	Male	70	Dunches of Kent Hospital	Had chronic illness (Diabetes and hypertension).	
245	29186	28 October 2020	Non-Malaysian	Male	56	Dunches of Kent Hospital	Had chronic illness (Chronic obstructive pulmonary disease).	
246	28252	28 October 2020	Malaysia	Female	61	Sungai Buloh Hospital	Had chronic illness (Diabetes and hypertension).	
247	11862	30 October 2020	Malaysia	Male	70	Queen Elizabeth Hospital	Had chronic illness (Hypertension).	
248	29786	30 October 2020	Non-Malaysian	Female	53	Tawau Hospital	Undisclosed.	
249	29787	30 October 2020	Non-Malaysian	Female	60	Dunches of Kent Hospital	Had chronic illness (Hypertension and stroke).	
250	16576	2 November 2020	Malaysia	Male	88	Dunches of Kent Hospital	Had chronic illness (Osteoporosis).	
251	14013	2 November 2020	Malaysia	Female	75	Queen Elizabeth Hospital	Had chronic illness (Diabetes, hypertension and dyslipidemia).	
252	29756	3 November 2020	Malaysia	Male	64	Queen Elizabeth Hospital	Had chronic illness (Diabetes, hypertension and heart disease).	
253	30556	3 November 2020	Malaysia	Female	58	Kudat Hospital	Had chronic illness (Diabetes and asthma).	
254	31417	3 November 2020	Malaysia	Female	44	Queen Elizabeth Hospital	Had chronic illness (Hypertension).	
255	31418	3 November 2020	Non-Malaysian	Male	14	Queen Elizabeth Hospital	Had chronic illness (Tuberculous meningitis and hydrocephalus)	
256	33007	3 November 2020	Non-Malaysian	Female	61	Dunches of Kent Hospital	Had chronic illness (Diabetes and hypertension).	
257	33008	3 November 2020	Non-Malaysian	Male	25	Dunches of Kent Hospital	Undisclosed.	
258	34014	3 November 2020	Malaysia	Male	82	Tawau Hospital	Undisclosed.	
259	34015	3 November 2020	Malaysia	Male	80	Queen Elizabeth Hospital	Had chronic illness (Hypertension, stroke and heart disease).	
260	34016	3 November 2020	Malaysia	Female	80	Queen Elizabeth Hospital	Undisclosed.	
261	34017	3 November 2020	Non-Malaysian	Female	70	Queen Elizabeth Hospital	Undisclosed.	
262	20237	3 November 2020	Malaysia	Female	47	Queen Elizabeth Hospital	Had chronic illness (Diabetes, hypertension and psoriasis).	
263	23399	3 November 2020	Malaysia	Male	56	Queen Elizabeth Hospital	Had chronic illness (Diabetes, hypertension, dyslipidemia and heart disease).	
264	17745	4 November 2020	Malaysia	Male	83	Duchess of Kent Hospital	Had chronic illness (Hypertension, diabetes and stroke).	
265	32597	4 November 2020	Malaysia	Male	63	Likas Women and Children's Hospital	Had chronic illness (Chronic lung disease).	
266	16846	4 November 2020	Malaysia	Male	79	Raja Permaisuri Bainun Hospital	Had chronic illness (Hypertension, dyslipidemia and kidney disease).	
267	32191	4 November 2020	Malaysia	Male	64	Tuaran Hospital	Had chronic illness (Hypertension and dyslipidemia)	
268	29671	4 November 2020	Malaysia	Female	56	Dunches of Kent Hospital	Had chronic illness (Hypertension, diabetes, dyslipidemia and heart disease).	
269	33909	4 November 2020	Malaysia	Male	63	Dunches of Kent Hospital	Had chronic illness (Chronic obstructive pulmonary disease)	
270	25352	4 November 2020	Non-Malaysian	Female	60	Tawau Hospital	Had chronic illness (Diabetes, hypertension and heart failure)	
271	34013	4 November 2020	Non-Malaysian	Male	70	Tawau Hospital	Had chronic illness (Stroke).	
272	35267	5 November 2020	Malaysia	Male	61	Selayang Hospital	Had chronic illness (Diabetes, hypertension, asthma and heart disease).	
273	34011	5 November 2020	Malaysia	Male	62	Dunches of Kent Hospital	Had chronic illness (Hypertension, stroke and tuberculosis).	
274	24193	5 November 2020	Malaysia	Male	54	Dunches of Kent Hospital	Had chronic illness (Hypertension).	
275	35035	5 November 2020	Malaysia	Male	77	Queen Elizabeth Hospital	Had chronic illness (Diabetes, hypertension and kidney stone disease).	
276	35036	5 November 2020	Non-Malaysian	Male	80	Tawau Hospital	Had chronic illness (Diabetes, hypertension, gout and paralysis).	
277	34012	5 November 2020	Non-Malaysian	Female	92	Dunches of Kent Hospital	Handicapped (blindness).	
278	35982	6 November 2020	Malaysia	Female	67	Duchess of Kent Hospital	Had chronic illness (Diabetes, hypertension and asthma).	
279	35303	6 November 2020	Malaysia	Male	54	Sultanah Bahiyah Hospital	Had chronic illness (Hypertension, chronic kidney disease and stroke).	
280	19812	7 November 2020	Malaysia	Female	51	Queen Elizabeth Hospital	Had chronic illness (Hypertension, obesity and dislipidemia).	
281	37625	7 November 2020	Malaysia	Female	62	Queen Elizabeth Hospital	Had chronic illness (Diabetes, hypertension and dislipidemia).	
282	37626	7 November 2020	Malaysia	Male	55	Queen Elizabeth Hospital	Had chronic illness (Diabetes, hypertension and stroke).	

=== Early cases ===
Prior to the detection of higher volumes of cases in mid-March 2020, cases detected in the first month were well-publicised, incorporating extensive details of the patients' travel history, sources of transmission and dates of diagnosis and discharge. The following data covers positive cases detected until 10 March 2020.

Case	Relationship group	Date of diagnosis	Date of discharged	Age	Nationality	Patient data	Status
1	G1	25 January 2020	14 February 2020	65	China	A Chinese female national from Wuhan. She was quarantined in a hotel in the forest city of Johor's Iskandar Puteri after entering the Tuas Checkpoint in Singapore with seven other relatives. She is the wife of the first positive infected patient in Singapore. At first she was negatively diagnosed with the new coronavirus, but on 25 January, the Malaysian Health Ministry confirmed she is positive with the new coronavirus where she subsequently warded at Sungai Buloh Hospital of Selangor. She was discharged from hospital on 14 February.	Discharged
2	G1	25 January 2020	14 February 2020	11	China	A Chinese male national from Wuhan. He was quarantined in a hotel in the forest city of Johor's Iskandar Puteri after entering the Tuas Checkpoint in Singapore with seven other relatives. He is the grandson of the first positive infected patient in Singapore. At first he was negatively diagnosed with the new coronavirus, but on 25 January, the Malaysian Health Ministry confirmed he is positive with the new coronavirus where he subsequently warded at Sungai Buloh Hospital of Selangor. He was discharged from hospital on 14 February.	Discharged
3	G1	25 January 2020	14 February 2020	2	China	A Chinese male national from Wuhan. He was quarantined in a hotel in the forest city of Johor's Iskandar Puteri after entering the Tuas Checkpoint in Singapore with seven other relatives. He is the grandson of the first positive infected patient in Singapore. At first he was negatively diagnosed with the new coronavirus, but on 25 January, the Malaysian Health Ministry confirmed he is positive with the new coronavirus. He was discharged from hospital on 14 February.	Discharged
4		25 January 2020	8 February 2020	40	China	A Chinese male national from Wuhan. Took a bus from Singapore to Johor's capital of Johor Bahru on 22 January via the Woodlands Checkpoint in Singapore. He had a fever on 23 January and went to a private hospital for examination before being referred into Sultanah Aminah Hospital. After the diagnosis confirmed he was infected with similar virus, he was referred to Permai Hospital for further treatment. On 8 February after doctors treated him with human immunodeficiency virus (HIV) drugs on 28 January, the patient finally allowed to leave the hospital after being tested negative three times.	Discharged
5	G1	28 January 2020	14 February 2020	36	China	A Chinese female national from Wuhan. She was quarantined in a hotel in the forest city of Johor's Iskandar Puteri after entering the Tuas Checkpoint in Singapore with seven other relatives. She is the daughter-in-law of the first positive infected patient in Singapore. Earlier, she had a negative test result and stayed at Sungai Buloh Hospital to take care of her two children who were diagnosed where she was later confirmed to be infected as well. She was discharged from the hospital on 14 February.	Discharged
6		28 January 2020	4 February 2020	4	China	A Chinese female national from Guangzhou. On 26 January, she went to Langkawi with her two-year-old sister despite already being sick. She was later confirmed to be infected on 28 January. On 4 February, she was released from hospital after successfully being cured with her latest tests were negative for the virus.	Discharged
7	G2	28 January 2020	18 February 2020	52	China	A Chinese male national. The husband of the 8th patient. Earlier tested positive for the virus on 30 January and warded at Permai Hospital of Johor. He was discharged from the hospital on 18 February.	Discharged
8	G2	30 January 2020	18 February 2020	49	China	A Chinese female national. The wife of the 7th patient. Earlier tested positive for the virus on 30 January and warded at Permai Hospital of Johor. She was discharged from the hospital on 18 February.	Discharged
9	G3	3 February 2020	17 February 2020	41	Malaysia	A Malaysian male national from Subang Jaya of Selangor. The first local cases involving Malaysian citizen, earlier he travelled to the Grand Hyatt Singapore from 16 to 23 January to attend an international conference with at least one person from Wuhan. On 29 January, he went to a private medical institution in Selangor for medical check-up due to fever and cough. He was subsequently admitted to Sungai Buloh Hospital for isolation and observation on 2 February and was diagnosed with the virus. On 17 February, the patient recovered and was released from hospital, becoming the first Malaysian citizen cured from the virus.	Discharged
10		3 February 2020	9 February 2020	63	China	A Chinese male national from Wuhan. On 18 January, he and his family entered from Xiamen of Fujian via Kuala Lumpur International Airport (KLIA). On 23 January, he developed mild fever and was treated at the Kuala Lumpur Hospital. He was discharged from the hospital on 9 February with the patient was not given any anti-viral medicine to cure the illness. Earlier, two repeat tests conducted on him between 7 and 8 February also showed negative.	Discharged
11	G4	5 February 2020	18 February 2020	45	Malaysia	A Malaysian male national from Wuhan who returned to Malaysia after the evacuation operation on 4 February. He did not show any symptoms during the physical examination procedures at KLIA. Subsequent testing on a quarantine centre in Nilai of Negeri Sembilan revealed that he and his son were positive for the new coronavirus. They were then being referred to an isolation ward at Tuanku Ja'afar Hospital in Seremban for further treatment. He was discharged from the hospital on 18 February.	Discharged
12	G4	5 February 2020	18 February 2020	9	Malaysia	A Malaysian male national from Wuhan who returned to Malaysia after the evacuation operation on 4 February. He did not show any symptoms during the physical examination procedures at KLIA. Subsequent testing on a quarantine centre in Nilai of Negeri Sembilan revealed that he and his father were positive for the new coronavirus. They were then being referred to an isolation ward at Tuanku Ja'afar Hospital in Seremban for further treatment. He was discharged from the hospital on 18 February.	Discharged
13	G3	5 February 2020	22 February 2020	40	Malaysia	A Malaysian female national who recently visited by her infected brother (the 9th patient) in Kedah's Sungai Petani during Chinese New Year on 23 January. She later developed symptoms of fever, throat pain and cough where she went to a private clinic for treatment. A test on her found she is positive with coronavirus and her brother who also positive with the virus was contacted by the country health officials immediately after her diagnosis. The woman became the first locally transmitted case despite her other family members tested negative for the virus. She is warded at the Sultanah Bahiyah Hospital of Kedah and discharged on 22 February after recovering from the virus.	Discharged
14	G5	5 February 2020	24 February 2020	37	China	A Chinese female national from Wuhan. On 25 January, she entered Malaysia with her mother (the 19th patient) and three friends where they toured around Kuala Lumpur. On 1 February, she went to Kuala Lumpur Hospital for treatment because of a slight fever. The doctor allowed her to go home to rest after prescribing the medicine but ordered her and her group to stay indoors and isolate. The county health officials continued to monitor the woman and found that her condition persisted until 5 February, she was referred again to Kuala Lumpur Hospital and later diagnosed with the virus on the same day. She was discharged from the hospital on 24 February.	Discharged
15		6 February 2020	16 February 2020	59	China	A Chinese female national from Wuhan, arrived in Singapore with her husband, son and daughter-in-law on 17 January and passed through Johor Bahru on 21 January to Malaysia. She developed fever on 26 January but did not go to any medical centre for treatment. She only took antipyretic herself and stayed indoors. She had planned to fly with her son and daughter-in-law from Johor Bahru to Guangzhou on 4 February but was not accompanied by her husband due to physical discomfort. On 5 February, the management of her residence reported her condition to the country health department. She was subsequently taken to the hospital and confirmed infected with the virus. She was discharged from hospital on 16 February after recovering.	Discharged
16	G5	7 February 2020	27 February 2020	67	China	A Chinese female national from Wuhan. The mother of 14th infected patient and also a friend to the 19th infected patient. She was discharged from hospital on 27 February.	Discharged
17	G3	8 February 2020	19 February 2020	65	Malaysia	A Malaysian female national who recently eating at the same table with the 9th confirmed patient during the Chinese New Year. Began to feel uncomfortable on 5 February with dizziness and night sweats but no fever. A diagnosis on her was confirmed on 8 February where she herself suffers from various chronic diseases, including hypertension, diabetes, paraplegia etc., and is also a heart patient with a pacemaker. She was discharged from hospital on 19 February.	Discharged
18		9 February 2020	19 February 2020	31	Malaysia	A Malaysian male national from Kuala Langat District of Selangor. He worked in Macau and had been to mainland China on 1 February where he later developed cough symptoms on 7 February. He was admitted to a hospital in Malaysia on the same day and was diagnosed with the virus on 9 February. After achieving a full recovery, he was discharged from the hospital on 19 February.	Discharged
19	G5	13 February 2020	24 February 2020	39	China	A Chinese female national from Wuhan. Arrived in Malaysia with four relatives and friends on 25 January. She had fever and cough on 12 February and was diagnosed with the virus on 13 February. After successfully being cured through treatment, she was discharged from hospital on 24 February.	Discharged
20		14 February 2020	19 February 2020	27	China	A Chinese male national from Guangzhou came to Malaysia to do business on 1 February, went to Thailand on 12 February and passed the border checkpoint in Kedah the following day. When returned to Malaysia, he had a fever and sent to hospital for screening. He was diagnosed positive with the virus on 14 February before being discharged from hospital on 19 February after undergoing treatment.	Discharged
21		14 February 2020	20 February 2020	32	China	A Chinese female national settled in Malaysia and married a local Malaysian. She returned to visit relatives in China from 22 to 30 January before developing sore throat symptoms on 13 February and diagnosed with the virus after being sent to hospital for testing. She was discharged from hospital on 20 February.	Discharged
22		15 February 2020	27 February 2020	83	United States	An American female national who is part of the MS Westerdam passenger. After disembarking from Cambodia on 13 February and passing the medical examination, she was allowed to return into her country by the Cambodian authorities. As Cambodia did not have any direct flights to Europe and the United States, she was flown to Malaysia on 14 February with other 144 passengers on board. She was diagnosed with abnormal temperature screening during arrival in KLIA and subsequently sent to Sungai Buloh Hospital of Selangor for examination where she is confirmed to be infected with the virus. She is still in the hospital for further treatment on other illnesses despite additional tests showing that she is now clear from the virus. She was finally discharged from hospital on 27 February.	Discharged
23		27 February 2020	–	53	Malaysia	A Malaysian female national who arriving back from Japan on 23 February developed fever symptoms the following day, and received treatment in a hospital in Kuala Lumpur. A coronavirus infection test was done, and it was found to be positive on 27 February.	In Patient
24		28 February 2020	6 March 2020	41	Japan	A Japanese female national who works in Malaysia in the capital city of Kuala Lumpur. The woman recently returned to Japan in January and travel to Indonesia in February before being diagnosed with the virus on 28 February. She was subsequently warded at the Kuala Lumpur Hospital. This case is linked to the first positive coronavirus case in Indonesia. After recovering, the woman was discharged from hospital on 6 March.	Discharged
25		28 February 2020	–	54	Italy	An Italian male national who married to a Malaysian spouse. The man has a travel history to Italy from 15–21 February for working purposes. On 28 February after he was diagnosed with the virus, the patient was subsequently warded in Sungai Buloh Hospital of Selangor.	In Patient
26		1 March 2020	–	52	Malaysia	A Malaysian male national who has a travel history to Shanghai of China in mid-January, began to developing sore throat and fever symptoms where he sought treatment at an outpatient private hospital. On 1 March after he was diagnosed with the virus, the patient was subsequently warded in Sungai Buloh Hospital of Selangor. He have attended farewell ceremony for former minister and deputy minister but both of them reported have negative result from the virus.	In Patient
27		1 March 2020	12 March 2020	20	Malaysia	A Malaysian female national who serve as a trainee nurse at a private hospital and treating the 24th case patient without any protection equipment, she began to developing symptoms from 27 February and subsequently warded in Kuala Lumpur Hospital.	Discharged
28		1 March 2020	12 March 2020	45	Malaysia	A Malaysian male national who is a colleague of the 25th patient.	Discharged
29		1 March 2020	–	35	Malaysia	A Malaysian female national who was admitted into a private hospital on 21 February and place in one room with the 24th case patient, whose situation was not known at the time. She was allowed to return home on 25 February but started to feeling unwell and developing cough and fever symptoms by 27 February without seeking any treatment. She was traced during closed contact tracing for the case 24th.	In Patient
30		3 March 2020	–	38	Malaysia	A Malaysian male national who travelled to Australia from 12 to 16 February. He also has close contact with 26th case and was tested positive on 2 March.	In Patient
31		3 March 2020	12 March 2020	50	Malaysia	A Malaysian male national who has close contact with 26th case. He does not have any recent travel record and was tested positive on 2 March.	Discharged
32		3 March 2020	12 March 2020	43	Malaysia	A Malaysian female national who has close contact with 26th case. She does not have any recent travel record and was tested positive on 2 March.	Discharged
33		3 March 2020	–	58	Malaysia	A Malaysian male national who recently travelled to Kuching, Sarawak for a meeting on 16 February. He also has close contact with 26th case and was tested positive on 2 March.	In Patient
34		3 March 2020	12 March 2020	40	Malaysia	A Malaysian male national who serve as a paramedic in Sungai Buloh Hospital, Selangor provided treatment to the 26th case. He was tested positive on 2 March and warded in Sungai Buloh Hospital.	Discharged
35		3 March 2020	12 March 2020	50	Malaysia	A Malaysian female national who recently travelled to Australia from 13 January to 16 February. She also has close contact with 26th case and was tested positive on 2 March. She was warded in Sungai Buloh Hospital.	Discharged
36		3 March 2020	–	49	Malaysia	A Malaysian male national who recently travelled to Egypt from 23 January to 1 February. He also has close contact with 26th case and was tested positive on 2 March. He was warded in Sungai Buloh Hospital.	In Patient
37		4 March 2020	–	63	Malaysia	Related with case number 26.	In Patient
38		4 March 2020	–	60	Malaysia	Related with case number 26.	In Patient
39		4 March 2020	–	45	Malaysia	Friend of 36th case. A second generation patient from 26th case.	In Patient
40		4 March 2020	–	49	Malaysia	Related with case number 26.	In Patient
41		4 March 2020	8 March 2020	27	Malaysia	Related with case number 26. The patient was discharged from Kuala Lumpur Hospital on 8 March.	Discharged
42		4 March 2020	–	38	Malaysia	Friend of 38th case. A second generation patient from 26th case.	In Patient
43		4 March 2020	–	59	Malaysia	A Malaysian female national who is the wife of 33rd case. She is a second generation patient from 26th case.	In Patient
44		4 March 2020	–	62	Malaysia	A Malaysian female national who is the wife of 47th case. She is a second generation patient of case 47.	In Patient
45		4 March 2020	–	30	Malaysia	Staff of 26th case.	In Patient
46		4 March 2020	–	41	Malaysia	Related with case number 26.	In Patient
47		4 March 2020	–	62	Malaysia	Related with case number 26.	In Patient
48		4 March 2020	–	55	Malaysia	Related with case number 26.	In Patient
49		4 March 2020	–	51	Malaysia	Related with case number 26.	In Patient
50		4 March 2020	–	56	Malaysia	Related with case number 26.	In Patient
51		5 March 2020	–	9	Malaysia	Child of 32nd case. A second generation patient from 26th case.	In Patient
52		5 March 2020	–	42	Malaysia	Driver of 33rd case. A second generation patient from 26th case.	In Patient
53		5 March 2020	12 March 2020	50	Malaysia	Staff of 33rd case. A second generation patient from 26th case.	Discharged
54		5 March 2020	–	40	Malaysia	Related to 26th case.	In Patient
55		5 March 2020	–	36	Malaysia	Driver of 26th case.	In Patient
56		6 March 2020	–	50	Malaysia	Related to 32nd case. A second generation patient to 26th case.	In Patient
57		6 March 2020	–	16	Malaysia	Related to 38th case. A second generation patient to 26th case.	In Patient
58		6 March 2020	–	29	Malaysia	Related to 38th case. A second generation patient to 26th case.	In Patient
59		6 March 2020	–	61	Malaysia	Related to 38th case. A second generation patient to 26th case.	In Patient
60		6 March 2020	–	63	Malaysia	Related to 26th case.	In Patient
61		6 March 2020	14 March 2020	58	Malaysia	Related to 33rd case. A second generation patient to 26th case.	Discharged
62		6 March 2020	–	50	Malaysia	Related to 33rd case. A second generation patient to 26th case.	In Patient
63		6 March 2020	–	8	Malaysia	Related to 39th case. A third generation patient after 26th and 39th case.	In Patient
64		6 March 2020	–	28	Malaysia	Related to 33rd case. A second generation patient to 26th case.	In Patient
65		6 March 2020	–	NA	Malaysia	Related to 31st case. A second generation patient to 26th case.	In Patient
66		6 March 2020	–	61	Malaysia	Related to 37th case. A second generation patient to 26th case.	In Patient
67		6 March 2020	–	33	Malaysia	Related to 37th case. A second generation patient to 26th case.	In Patient
68		6 March 2020	–	36	Malaysia		In Patient
69		6 March 2020	–	32	Malaysia		In Patient
70		6 March 2020	–	51	Malaysia		In Patient
71		6 March 2020	–	56	Malaysia		In Patient
72		6 March 2020	–	44	Malaysia		In Patient
73		6 March 2020	–	53	Malaysia		In Patient
74		6 March 2020	–	35	Malaysia		In Patient
75		6 March 2020	–	20	Malaysia		In Patient
76		6 March 2020	–	24	Malaysia		In Patient
77		6 March 2020	–	57	Malaysia		In Patient
78		6 March 2020	11 March 2020	47	Malaysia	Travelled to Indonesia for seven days starting 13 February. Developed symptoms on 19 February.	Discharged
79		6 March 2020	–	32	Malaysia		In Patient
80		6 March 2020	–	36	Malaysia		In Patient
81		6 March 2020	–	51	Malaysia		In Patient
82		6 March 2020	–	53	Malaysia		In Patient
83		6 March 2020	–	53	Malaysia	Part of cluster of cases linked to Case 33 but how she is linked is not disclosed. However, we know this is a second generation case, i.e. had close contact with another person who had contact with Case 33.	In Patient
84		7 March 2020	–	NA	Malaysia	A third generation patient after 26th and 33rd case.	In Patient
85		7 March 2020	–	NA	Malaysia	Related to 33rd case. A second generation patient to 26th case.	In Patient
86		7 March 2020	–	NA	Malaysia	Related to 33rd case. A second generation patient to 26th case.	In Patient
87		7 March 2020	9 March 2020	68	Malaysia	Related to 33rd case. A second generation patient to 26th case.	Discharged
88		7 March 2020	–	NA	Malaysia	A third generation patient after 26th and 33rd case.	In Patient
89		7 March 2020	–	NA	Malaysia	A third generation patient after 26th and 33rd case.	In Patient
90		7 March 2020	–	NA	Malaysia	A third generation patient after 26th and 33rd case.	In Patient
91		7 March 2020	–	NA	Malaysia	A third generation patient after 26th and 33rd case.	In Patient
92		7 March 2020	–	NA	Malaysia	A third generation patient after 26th and 33rd case.	In Patient
93		7 March 2020	–	NA	Malaysia	Related to 33rd case. A second generation patient to 26th case.	In Patient
94		8 March 2020	–	NA	Malaysia	Related to 26th case.	In Patient
95		8 March 2020	–	NA	Malaysia	Related to 26th case.	In Patient
96		8 March 2020	–	NA	Malaysia	Related to 26th case.	In Patient
97		8 March 2020	–	NA	Malaysia	Related to 26th case.	In Patient
98		8 March 2020	–	NA	Malaysia	Related to 26th case.	In Patient
99		8 March 2020	–	NA	Malaysia	Related to 26th case.	In Patient
100		9 March 2020	–	NA	Malaysia		In Patient
101		9 March 2020	–	NA	Malaysia	Travelled to Iran with his business partner from 20–27 February. Tested on 5 March and diagnosed with the virus on 8 March.	In Patient
102		9 March 2020	–	NA	Malaysia		In Patient
103		9 March 2020	–	NA	Malaysia		In Patient
104		9 March 2020	–	NA	Malaysia		In Patient
105		9 March 2020	–	NA	Malaysia		In Patient
106		9 March 2020	–	NA	Malaysia		In Patient
107		9 March 2020	–	NA	Malaysia		In Patient
108		9 March 2020	–	NA	Malaysia		In Patient
109		9 March 2020	–	NA	Malaysia		In Patient
110		9 March 2020	–	NA	Malaysia		In Patient
111		9 March 2020	–	NA	Malaysia		In Patient
112		9 March 2020	–	NA	Malaysia		In Patient
113		9 March 2020	–	NA	Malaysia		In Patient
114		9 March 2020	–	NA	Malaysia		In Patient
115		9 March 2020	–	NA	Malaysia		In Patient
116		9 March 2020	–	NA	Malaysia		In Patient
117		9 March 2020	–	NA	Malaysia		In Patient
118		10 March 2020	–	NA	Malaysia	Part of cluster of cases linked to Case 33 but how they are linked is not disclosed.	In Patient
119		10 March 2020	–	NA	Malaysia	Part of cluster of cases linked to Case 33 but how they are linked is not disclosed.	In Patient
120		10 March 2020	–	NA	Malaysia	Part of cluster of cases linked to Case 33 but how they are linked is not disclosed.	In Patient

== See also ==
- COVID-19 pandemic in Malaysia
- COVID-19 pandemic in Sabah
- COVID-19 pandemic in Sarawak
- Timeline of the COVID-19 pandemic in Malaysia
