= COVID-19 pandemic in Kuala Lumpur =

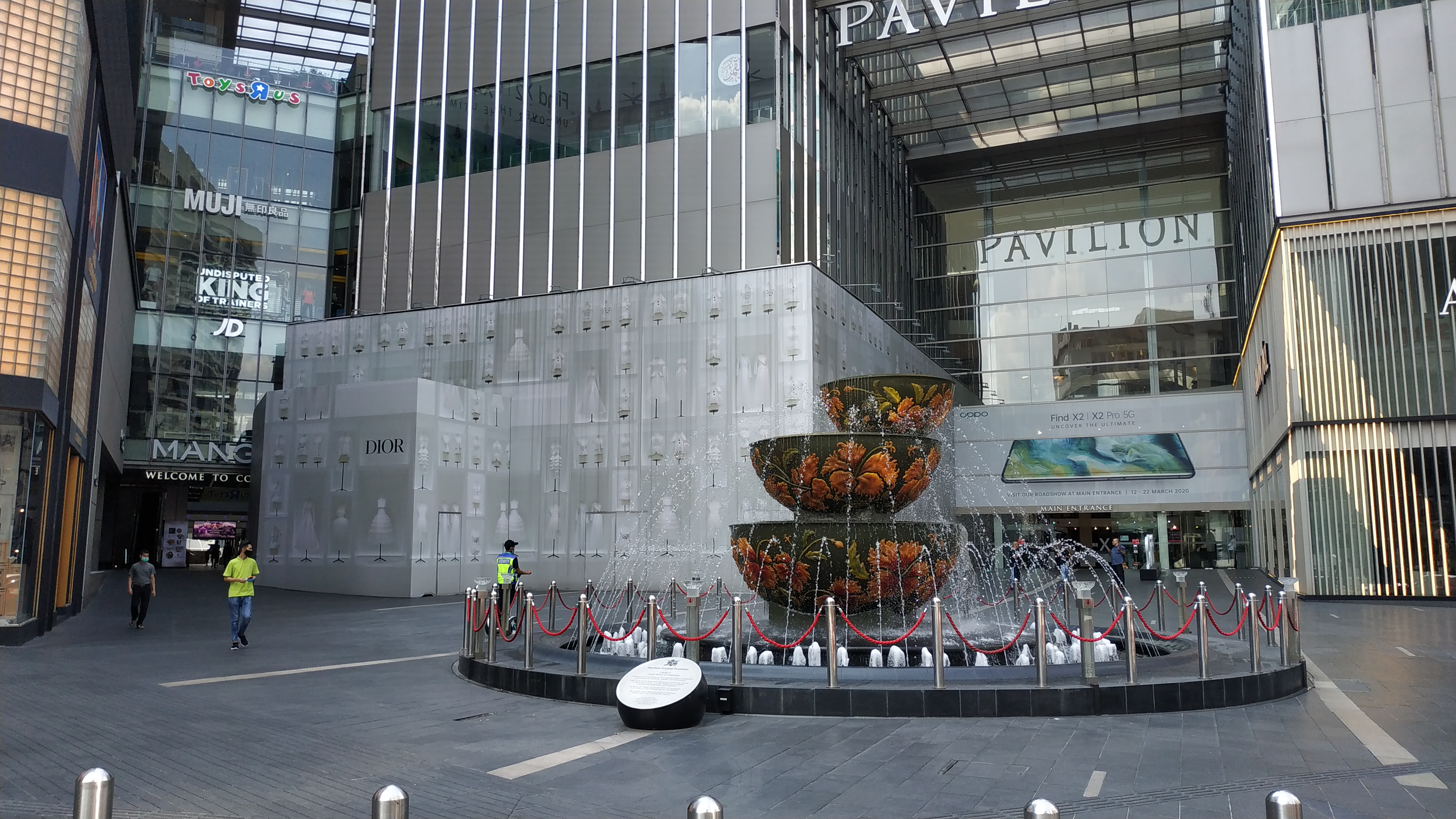
- Pavilion Kuala Lumpur during the Movement Control Order.
- Disease: COVID-19
- Pathogen: SARS-CoV-2
- Location: Kuala Lumpur, Malaysia
- First outbreak: Wuhan, Hubei, China
- Index case: Titiwangsa
- Arrival date: 5 February 2020
- Confirmed cases: 2,445
- Active cases: N/A
- Recovered: 2,416
- Deaths: 18

Government website
- https://newslab.malaysiakini.com/covid-19/en/state/kuala-lumpur (Non government)

The COVID-19 pandemic in Kuala Lumpur started when a Chinese male national from Wuhan in the province of Hubei tested positive on 3 February 2020. As of 10 July, Kuala Lumpur confirmed 2,445 cases and 18 fatalities.

== Statistics ==
Distribution of active cases in past 14 days in areas of Kuala Lumpur (as of 19 July 2021)
Area		Active cases in past 14 days
1	Lembah Pantai	4
2	Cheras	3
2	Titiwangsa	3
4	Kepong	1
Total		9

=== Details of death cases in Kuala Lumpur ===
Details of the confirmed death cases in Kuala Lumpur as of 7 July 2020
Case Number		Date of Death	Nationality	Gender	Age	Hospitalised Location	Patient Data	Source	Additional Source
1	290	21 March 2020	Malaysia	Male	57	Kuala Lumpur Hospital	The deceased was identified as Idris Atan, a Malaysian Islamic Party (PAS) veteran. He travelled to Vietnam and had direct contact with a Tablighi Jamaat in Masjid Sri Petaling participant. Developed symptoms on 7 March. He died at 3:22 pm, 21 March. He was a veteran PAS member and founded PAS branch in Batu Caves, Selangor on 1988.		
2	1334	24 March 2020	Malaysia	Male	75	Kuala Lumpur Hospital	Identified as Lt Col Rahmad Said, who is a military veteran. First hospitalised in Tuanku Mizan Military Hospital on 16 March before being transferred to Kuala Lumpur Hospital on 18 March. He died at 7:40 pm, 24 March.		
3	1056	26 March 2020	Malaysia	Male	35	Kuala Lumpur Hospital	Identified as Mohd Fairos Saberon, a police inspector. Saberon had travel history to Bandung, Indonesia on early March. Saberon died at 9:30 pm, 26 March.		
4	787	29 March 2020	Malaysia	Male	77	Kuala Lumpur Hospital	Had hypertension. Died at 10:40 am, 29 March.		
5	2626	27 March 2020	Malaysia	Male	69	—N/a	Had diabetes and hypertension, and travelled to Saudi Arabia before. He died at his home on 27 March and the body was brought to Kuala Lumpur Hospital. He was diagnosed during the post-mortem.		
6	193	31 March 2020	Malaysia	Female	80	Kuala Lumpur Hospital	Had diabetes, hypertension and heart disease. Died at 4:30 am, 31 March after 18 days of hospitalisation. She is the close contact of Case 115.		
7	1053	31 March 2020	Malaysia	Male	62	Kuala Lumpur Hospital	Had diabetes and hypertension and was a close contact of Case 486. Died at 10:46 pm, 31 March.		
8	2149	28 March 2020	Malaysia	Female	85	National Heart Institute	Had heart disease. Died at 12:10 am, 28 March.		
9	3484	4 April 2020	Malaysia	Male	68	Kuala Lumpur Hospital	Had diabetes. Died at 3:40 pm, 4 April.		
10	1906	8 April 2020	Pakistan	Male	69	Kuala Lumpur Hospital	A participant of Tablighi Jamaat event in Masjid Sri Petaling. He died at 9:30 am, 8 April. He lived in Menara City One condominium which was placed under Enhanced Movement Control Order due to spike of cases. He was the 2nd fatality of Kuala Lumpur related to Tabligh cluster.		
11	4229	10 April 2020	Malaysia	Male	77	Kuala Lumpur Hospital	Had diabetes. Died at 4 am, 10 April.		
12	4818	12 April 2020	Malaysia	Male	63	Kuala Lumpur Hospital	Had heart and kidney disease. Died at 11:36 pm, 12 April.		
13	4711	15 April 2020	Malaysia	Male	66	Kuala Lumpur Hospital	Had hypertension and heart disease. Died at 12:55 pm, 15 April. He was a close contact of Case 5332 (15th death).		
14	2657	12 April 2020	Malaysia	Male	60	Kuala Lumpur Hospital	Had diabetes and hypertension. Died at 3:20 pm, 12 April.		
15	5332	21 April 2020	Malaysia	Male	92	Kuala Lumpur Hospital	Had diabetes, hypertension and dementia. He had close contact with Case 4711 (13th death). Died at 1:30 am, 21 April.		
16	2806	24 April 2020	Malaysia	Female	62	Kuala Lumpur Hospital	She was the mother of Case 1346. Had hypertension. Died at 5:43 pm, 24 April.		
17	5441	30 April 2020	Malaysia	Male	66	Kuala Lumpur Hospital	Had close contact with Case 4818 (12th death) and had cancer. Died at 4 pm, 30 April.		
18	7468	12 June 2020	India	Male	67	Canselor Tuanku Muhriz UKM Hospital	The deceased was identified as Zeawdeen Kadar Masdar, an Indian national from Paramakudi, Tamil Nadu who was detained at the Bukit Jalil Immigration Detention Depot. He had diabetes, hypertension, heart and kidney disease. Masdar was found unconscious on 12 June and was rushed to UKM Hospital, and died. As of 22 June, the post-mortem report is still underway.		

== Timeline ==
=== February 2020 ===
On 3 February, Kuala Lumpur recorded its first case of infection: a 63-year-old Chinese male national. He arrived in Kuala Lumpur International Airport (KLIA) from Xiamen of Fujian Province on 18 January with his family. He developed mild fever on 23 January, and was admitted to Kuala Lumpur Hospital (HKL). He was tested positive on 3 February. He wasn't given any antiviral drugs for treatment.

On 5 February, another case was recorded: a 37-year-old Chinese female national. She arrived in Kuala Lumpur International Airport with her mother and three friends on 25 January, and toured around the city. On 1 February, she sought treatment at HKL after having slight fever. The doctor allowed her to go home to rest after prescribing the medicine, but order her and her group to stay indoors and isolate. Health officials continued to monitor the woman and found that her condition persisted until 5 February, where she was referred to HKL and diagnosed at the same day.
