= COVID-19 pandemic in Sabah =

Aspect of viral disease pandemic

- Disease: COVID-19
- Pathogen: SARS-CoV-2
- Location: Sabah, Malaysia
- First outbreak: Wuhan, Hubei, China
- Index case: Tawau District
- Arrival date: 12 March 2020 (6 years, 8 months and 6 days)
- Confirmed cases: 402,031
- Active cases: 5,397
- Recovered: 393,454
- Deaths: 3,180

Government website
- covid19.sabah.digital/covid19

The COVID-19 pandemic was confirmed to have reached Sabah, Malaysia, in March 2020. As of the end of 2022, there were 514,981 confirmed cases.

== Statistics ==
Distribution of cumulative confirmed cases in districts of Sabah (as of 28 September 2020)
Districts		Confirmed	Recovered	Death	Active
1	Beaufort	16	14	0	2
2	Beluran	2	2	0	0
3	Keningau	21	19	1	1
4	Kinabatangan	33	24	0	9
5	Kota Belud	7	7	0	0
6	Kota Kinabalu	92	76	4	12
7	Kota Marudu	2	1	0	1
8	Kudat	4	3	0	1
9	Kunak	75	17	0	58
10	Lahad Datu	295	198	0	97
11	Nabawan	2	2	0	0
12	Papar	11	6	0	5
13	Penampang	28	22	1	5
14	Pitas	3	1	0	2
15	Putatan	12	10	0	2
16	Ranau	5	5	0	0
17	Sandakan	44	40	0	4
18	Semporna	309	7	3	299
19	Sipitang	8	4	0	4
20	Tambunan	3	2	1	0
21	Tawau	759	372	2	385
22	Tongod	5	5	0	0
23	Tuaran	33	32	0	1
Total		1,769	869	12	888

Details of the confirmed death cases in Sabah
Case Number		Date of Death	Nationality	Gender	Age	Hospitalised Location	Patient Data	Source
1	152	20 March 2020	Malaysia	Male	58	Tawau Hospital	Part of the religious gathering cluster. Hospitalised on 9 March 2020 after showing severe acute respiratory infection (SARI) symptoms.	
2	2200	4 April 2020	Malaysia	Male	66	Keningau Hospital	Had chronic illness. Hospitalised on 26 March 2020.	
3	694	10 April 2020	Malaysia	Male	62	Queen Elizabeth Hospital	Close contact of a positive case from the religious gathering cluster. Had chronic illness. Hospitalised on 17 March 2020.	
4	4532	—N/a	—N/a	Male	26	—N/a	A non-Malaysian male was found dead in Kota Kinabalu with his body are tested positive for the coronavirus on 11 April 2020 through an autopsy. The case is investigated under Royal Malaysia Police investigation.	
5	6856	7 May 2020	Malaysia	Female	53	Likas Women and Children's Hospital	A medical staff of Ministry of Health in Sabah and had been on a sick leave due to cancer and hypertension. Hospitalised on 5 May.	
6	8370	11 June 2020	Malaysia	Female	85	—N/a	Died at home and body was brought to the Keningau Hospital.	
7	8403	12 June 2020	Malaysia	Female	96	—N/a	Died at home and body was brought to the Queen Elizabeth Hospital.	
8	8974	29 July 2020	Philippines	Male	64	Queen Elizabeth Hospital	Had chronic illness.	
9	10145	14 September 2020	Philippines	Female	50	Semporna Hospital	Hospitalised on 14 September 2020.	
10	10495	19 September 2020	Indonesia	Female	48	Tawau Hospital	Had chronic illness. Hospitalised on 18 September 2020.	
11	10493	22 September 2020	Malaysia	Male	54	Tawau Hospital	Hospitalised on 20 September 2020.	
12	10491	27 September 2020	Malaysia	Female	81	Tawau Hospital	Hospitalised on 17 September 2020.	
13	11185	26 September 2020	Malaysia	Male	70	—N/a	Had terminal cancer. Died at home and body was brought to the Tawau Hospital. Confirmed to be positive on 29 September 2020.	

The top plot shows the total number of cases as a function of time (by date) since 12 March 2020, the date of the first reported case in Sabah. The middle plot shows the number of new cases as reported each day. The bottom plot shows the number of active cases in Sabah.

Total confirmed cases Active cases Recoveries Deaths

View source data.

New cases per day

View source data.

Active cases

View source data.

== Timeline ==
=== March 2020 ===
On 12 March 2020, Sabah reported its first positive case involving a male resident from Tawau District who had been one of the participant in the Muslim religious gathering at Sri Petaling in Kuala Lumpur. He began to develop symptoms after returning and was subsequently transferred to Tawau Hospital. A second positive case was reported the following day in Benoni's Papar District which also originated from the religious gathering where he was then transferred to Queen Elizabeth Hospital for further treatment. A total of 14 new confirmed cases were recorded within the day. On 14 March, the Sabah State Health Department reported that another 11 new cases were confirmed in the state, bringing the total to 26. A further spike to 82 positive cases was then reported making Sabah the third most affected in Malaysia by the virus after Selangor and Kuala Lumpur. Earlier since the first positive case was reported, the State Health Department had warned that more positive cases were expected. By 18 March, the total positive cases had risen to 103. A further seven infections were recorded on 20 March, raising the total infected to 119 with the first death caused by the virus reported in Tawau involving a 58-year-old man who had been one of the participant of the religious gathering. The religious gathering also caused the closure of palm oil plantations in three districts of Tawau, Lahad Datu and Kinabatangan in late March after several plantation workers who had participated in the gathering were found positive with the virus. On 26 March, Sabah reported its first recovery of a coronavirus patient in Sandakan District. The entire Gaya Island inhabitants in the western coast of Sabah had also been put under close monitoring. 65.6% of the inhabitants were tested and 1,600 samples were taken. By 29 March, Tawau District was declared a red zone with a significant increase in positive cases, surpassing other districts within the state.

=== April 2020 ===
By early April, a total of 7,173 coronavirus tests had been conducted with the results of positive cases rising to 209. Within the same month, more than 90 people recovered from the virus with three deaths reported since March; the latest involving a 66-year-old man in Tambunan District with a medical history of diabetes, high blood pressure and kidney disease on 5 April along with a 62-year-old retired senior Sabah government official and tabligh worker with diabetes who died in Kota Kinabalu District on 10 April. On 9 April, a total of 231,980 people had been screened in the state out of which 16,654 samples had been taken for testing. The State Health Department explained that further positive cases would only be known once 4,600 samples were cleared in the following two days by a special task force set up on 8 April. The task force had previously faced a testing backlog following the shortage of reagents. Earlier on 6 April, a body of a 26-year-old man without identity documents was found hanged to a tree in a jungle area at Pondo Village in Gaya Island. His death was believed to be a suicide, which was later confirmed in a subsequent post-mortem. In addition, further screening also identified the deceased as being COVID-19 positive, making the case count as the fourth death for COVID-19 in Sabah.

Through a statement made by the Sabah Health Department on 13 April, a total of 5,007 tests had been done - more than the expected 4,600 backlog samples. According to the findings, a quarter of coronavirus cases in Kota Kinabalu were categorised as being sporadic. 5,983 patients were placed under home quarantine, with 956 in Tawau, 796 in Kota Kinabalu, 684 in Kunak, 624 in Papar, 603 in Penampang, 416 in Kinabatangan, 297 in Keningau and 231 in Sandakan while a further total of 853 people were placed in state-provided quarantine centres. Among the areas - Greater Kota Kinabalu, Penampang District recorded the most sporadic case numbers. Further infection clusters were detected in both Sabah Women and Children's Hospital in Likas and Keningau Hospital from outside source which were then contracted by several of the hospital staff members. Another cluster was identified on 18 April at the Queen Elizabeth Hospital II. By 17 April, Kota Kinabalu District became the second red zone with the second most infection rate after Tawau District. This was followed by Lahad Datu District the following day which became the third red zone. Through a survey of infections within the state, the virus was found to be infecting more males than females, with those infected aged between 1 and 80. It was also discovered that 85% of coronavirus positive patients in the state was asymptomatic. On 30 April, Beluran District which was previously declared as a green zone registered its first positive case.

=== May 2020 ===
Further cases were detected around the state capital of Kota Kinabalu such as Luyang and further to Sembulan by mid-May. With the limited supply of reagents, the Sabah State Health Department announced that it was unsure of being able to screen an estimated more than 100,000 foreign workers in the state. This was despite the announcement made by the federal government for foreign workers across the country to undergo mandatory screening following a spike in cases amongst them. On 11 May, further cases were detected in four districts comprising Keningau, Lahad Datu, Semporna and Tawau. Most of the newer cases involved returning students and several individuals who had flouted home quarantine rules. A fifth death by the virus was reported within the month on 16 May involving a 53-year-old terminally ill female cancer patient with hypertension who had also been a health worker. By 24 May, another green zone of Kota Marudu District registered its first positive case involving a returnee from Kuala Lumpur. Most of the additional cases in the state capital as well in the whole Sabah was mainly import cases involving returnees from West Malaysia as found through the survey of the State Health Department.

=== June 2020 ===
On 1 June, Sabah State Health Director Christina Rundi announced that only 12 remaining positive cases were being treated in six specialist hospitals within the state from which a total of 346 cases had been registered in Sabah; of these 329 had recovered and five died. By 11 June, further cases rose to 356 with the sixth virus fatality involving an 85-year-old elderly woman who died at her home in Keningau District within the same day. Her body was subsequently brought into Keningau Hospital with the deceased's close contacts also found to be positive with the virus. The following day, another virus casualty was reported involving an elderly 96-year-old woman who also died at her home.

=== July 2020 ===
On 29 July, Sabah State Health Director Christina reported a further three new cases in the districts of Lahad Datu, Papar and Penampang, bringing the cumulative number of COVID-19 cases in the state to 392. Among those infected were primary school students with the eighth fatality victim a 64-year-old Filipino with heart complications.

=== August 2020 ===
The infection cases continue to climb in August despite no deaths reported in the month. A Roman Catholic church in Kota Kinabalu District decided to suspend Masses for two weeks after one of its parishioners was found to be positive with the virus.

=== September 2020 ===
On 11 September, Sabah recorded the highest infections rate from a new cluster in Lahad Datu with newer cases passing 300 and becoming the highest case jump of COVID-19 in Malaysia in more than 3 months.

On 28 September, Senior Minister Ismail Sabri Yaakob announced that an enhanced MCO would be imposed on the districts of Lahad Datu, Tawau, Kunak, and Semporna between 29 September and October 12. Under this lockdown, non-residents and visitors would not be allowed to enter the district and most business activities apart from essential services would have to cease.

=== October 2020 ===
On 1 October, Director-General of Health Noor Hisham Abdullah confirmed that 118 of the 260 new cases reported that day had occurred in Sabah. 31 cases reported in other Malaysian states were linked to those who had returned from Sabah recently. The Joo Hwa cluster in Sabah was also identified by the Health Ministry.

On 10 October, 40 of the 66 nurses manning intensive care units at Queen Elizabeth II Hospital in Kota Kinabalu were quarantined after one of their colleagues tested positive for COVID-19. In response to the outbreak in Sabah, Director-General Noor Hisham announced that the Malaysian Health Ministry had dispatched a total of 475 medical and public health workers to Tawau, Lahad Datu, Semporna and Kota Kinabalu.

=== November 2020 ===
On 11 November, the Director-General Noor Hisham Abdullah identified three new clusters in the state: the Karamunting cluster, Saga cluster and Haven cluster.

=== August 2021 ===
On 17 August, the Minister in charge of COVID-19 matters in Sabah, Datuk Seri Panglima Masidi Manjun reported a record of 2,103 new cases, with close contacts making up 58% of these cases (1,229 individuals). Tawau reported 255 new cases, Sandakan 208 cases, Tuaran 200 cases, Keningau 163 new cases, and Penampang 135 new cases. A new cluster called the "Kluster Sawit Baiduri" consisting of 77 positive cases was identified in Lahad Datu.

== Implications ==
=== Masks and hand sanitiser shortages ===
Sabah's capital city of Kota Kinabalu have reported shortages on both surgical masks and hand sanitiser since January. There were reports that some businesses in the state taking advantage of the situation by selling overpriced masks during the period which led them being fined by the Domestic Trade and Consumer Affairs Ministry branch of Sabah.

=== Economic impact ===
Many of the state residents in each districts rush to stock up essential items once the first positive case were reported among netizens even before the official announcement of the first case was made by the state government of Sabah. With the rising number of positive cases been reported, residents in one of Sabah's district of Kunak are reportedly buying large quantities of rice to stock up foods. The Deputy Chief Minister of Sabah Christina Liew has called on the community in her constituency of Tawau to avoid from panic buying despite the quick spread of the virus. Throughout the first week of the movement control order (MCO), a supermarket in Papar also reportedly being stormed by shoppers who rush to buy sanitisers.

On 16 August, State COVID-19 spokesperson Masidi Manjun announced that Sabah's construction, manufacturing, mining and quarry sectors with at least 80% of workers vaccinated would be reallowed to reopen. Manjun also announced that companies within these sectors, with 60% to 79% of their manpower vaccinated, would also be allowed to operate at 80% capacity. The reopening of these sectors is part of the second phase of the Malaysian Government's National Recovery Plan.

=== Repatriation of foreigners ===
On 5 June, National Security Council Sabah director Sharifah Sitti Saleha Habib Yussof confirmed that 5,300 Filipino "illegal immigrants" had been "stranded" at temporary detention centres in Sabah after the Philippines government refused to repatriate them due to the COVID-19 pandemic in that country. Since the imposition of a Condition Movement Control Order in May, state authorities have repatriated 322 Indonesian illegal immigrants via Tawau.

In late June, National Security Council Sabah director Sharifah confirmed that state authorities would be deporting 250 undocumented migrants. The first batch of 134 would be deported on 24 June while the second batch of 133 would be deported on 26 June.

=== Repatriation of Malaysian nationals ===
On 23 June, Bernama and The Sun reported that at least twenty Malaysians were stranded in Indonesia's Nunukan Regency and unable to return to Sabah. The Malaysian Consulate in Pontianak had sent a letter to the Sabah Government requesting permission for the family to be allowed to return to Tawau but had received no response.

=== 2020 Sabah state election ===
On 9 August, it was announced that the 2020 Sabah state election would be held on 26 September. In response, members of the public and democracy observers urged local authorities to consider postal voting due to the ongoing pandemic and in order to reduce virus transmissions during the election. On 21 August, the High Court dismissed an appeal by 33 Sabah assemblymen against Governor Juhar Mahiruddin's consent to dissolve the Sabah State Legislative Assembly, paving the way for the state election. On 11 September, the Federal Court dismissed Datuk Jahid Noordin Jahim's appeal to stop the election, allowing nominations to begin the following day.

A surge of COVID-19 cases nationwide has been linked to the movement of voters and politicians between Sabah and Peninsular Malaysia, with daily reported cases increased to three digit numbers. In response, the Federal Government on 14 October announced the implementation of a Conditional Movement Control Order (CMCO) throughout Selangor, Kuala Lumpur, and Putrajaya due to the rising number of cases.

== Counter-measures by state government and other parties ==
The state government has released several guidelines to curb the spread of the virus and assured the public that essential goods will be sufficient despite the ongoing increase of infections and panic buying.

=== Food security ===
We have to look into food security – agriculture, fisheries, fruits – all of that is needed. The lockdown could be until May, June. Even if export is not encouraged, we will need adequate supply. People are losing their jobs, we cannot lose food supply as well. Next is to revive the economy. We will be looking into job opportunities. We are also forgoing tax collections in order to lighten the burden on people who are suffering.

— Sabah Chief Minister Shafie Apdal on the Sabah plan to boost food production throughout the pandemic, 15 April 2020.

Due to the pandemic, the Sabah state government has been in the process of boosting its food security. This involved a total of 10,000 acres of land in Sapi Canal of Sandakan District and another 200 acres of land in Long Pasia of Sipitang District and another in Membakut of Beaufort District that were transformed into rice cultivation areas to cut the overdependence of rice supply from Thailand and Vietnam. The available paddy field in Kota Belud District is currently not enough to supply the entire state.

With the oversupply of fruits and highland vegetables in the state through the ongoing MCO, the Sabah state government had also decided to export these excess supply to Brunei and markets around Malaysia which had been facing shortage of supplies and as a method to prevent the produce from going into waste.

=== Masks and hand sanitisers ===
On 21 June, Chief Minister Shafie Apdal announced that the Sabah state government had purchased 15 million face masks and hand sanitisers for people living in the state. 200 schools had also been supplied with face masks and hand sanitisers prior to the planned reopening of schools on 24 June.

=== Prevention for immigrations ===
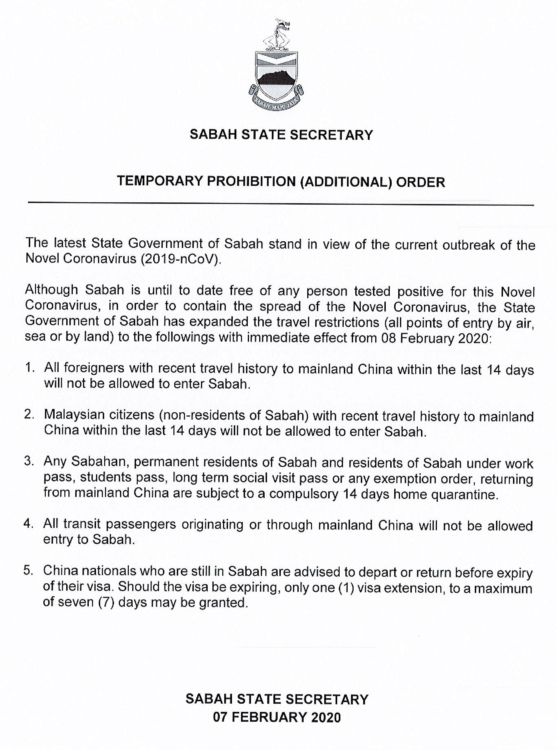
Prohibition dated 7 February 2020 issued by the Government of Sabah.

Since the earlier several suspected cases in Sabah's capital of Kota Kinabalu, all direct flights between the state with mainland China have been stopped indefinitely. Further travel restrictions were imposed by the state government towards the three most affected countries by the virus; comprising Iran, Italy and South Korea by March.

In line with the announcement of the MCO made by the federal government of Malaysia since the growing number of infections within the country, non-Sabahans are barred from entering the state with immediate effect as additional efforts to counter the increase in the number of positive cases. Sabahan university students in Peninsular Malaysia with settlement problem during the order period may stay at Sabah House, Cheras with food provided by the state government. Civil servants across the country are exempts from the ban despite each of them still must showing valid confirmation letters that are issued by their heads of departments for each specific task.

With the reports that there is another Muslim religious gathering to be held at Gowa, South Sulawesi in neighbouring Indonesia, the Sabah state government banned the entry of those who attended the gathering.

On 27 April 2021, Sabah banned nationals from India, France, the United States, Africa and Brazil from entering the country due to a COVID-19 variant said to have originated in India. From 28 April, only Sabahans, their spouses and children will be allowed to enter Sabah following a 14-day quarantine.

=== Movement control order and bans on mass gathering events ===
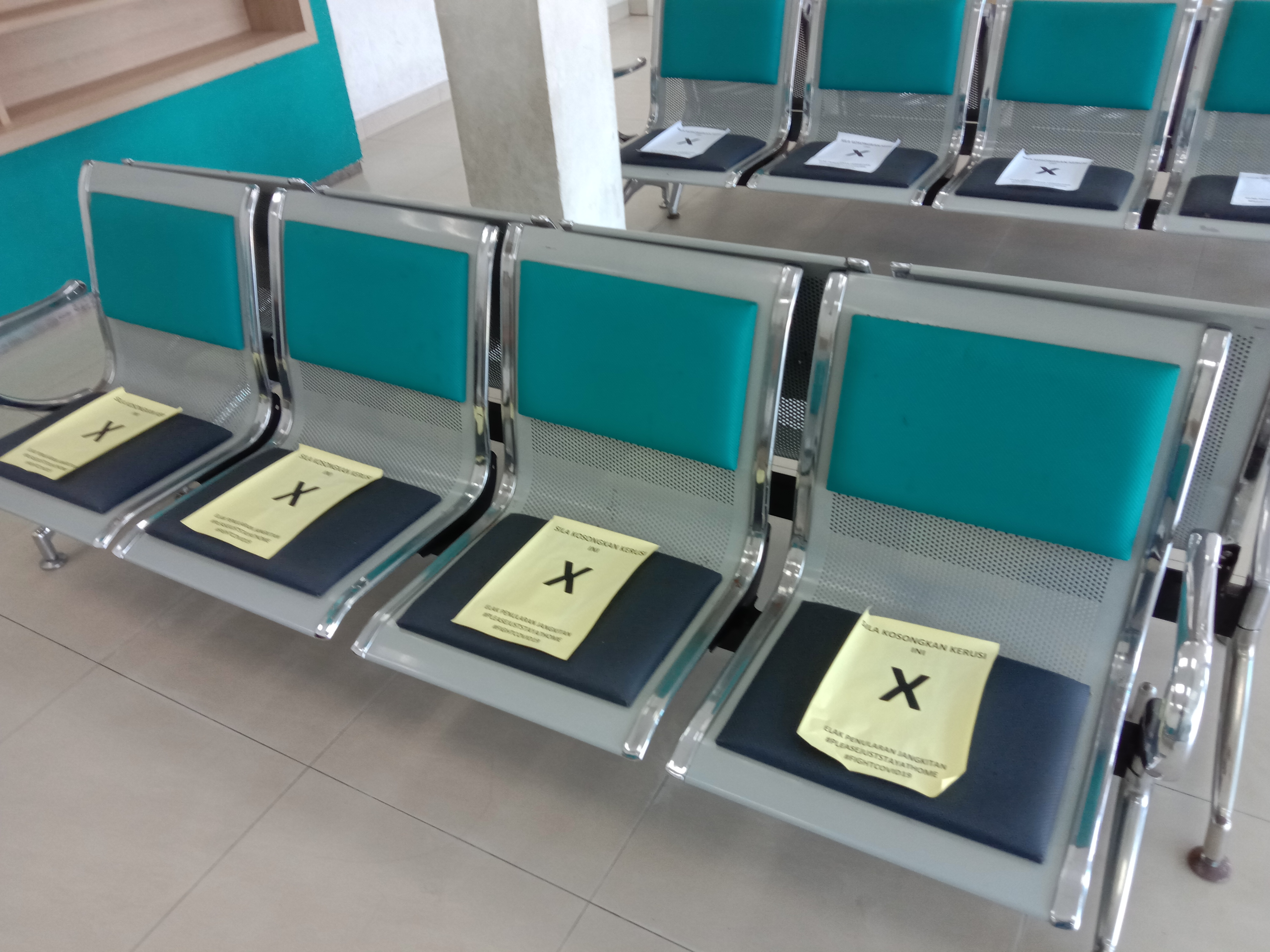
Seats at a Bank Simpanan Nasional (BSN) branch in Papar District are vacated with a notice, only three persons are allowed to enter at a time with the public required to wear a surgical mask before entering.

Annual cultural events in Sabah such as the Kaamatan (Kadazan-Dusun festival) and Kalimaran (Murut festival) have been cancelled, while Catholic Masses and Good Friday in the state were observed through a live broadcast online. Muslim Friday sermons and every congregational prayers had been postponed since March as announced by the Sabah Fatwa Council. The state government also not allowing the usual Ramadan bazaars to be operational throughout the pandemic along with the weekly tamu (weekly market) and pasar tani (farmers market) to curb the virus transmission which it will be replaced with digital online bazaar as has been introduced by most states nationwide. International sporting events such as the Borneo International Marathon scheduled to be held in Sabah also have been cancelled.

Following reports of poor compliance to the MCO in the state capital of Kota Kinabalu, the Royal Malaysia Police (PDRM) has imposed citywide round-the-clock roadblocks aimed at warning obstinate individuals who go against the order until the end of the two week period. With the increasing enforcement being conducted, city folks are getting better at complying the order. The state government also sealed off coronavirus hotspots in major towns such as in several areas in Kota Kinabalu, Sandakan and Tawau to minimise movement amid a growing number of cases in these areas including ordering some factories and plantations in Kalabakan and Lahad Datu with detection of cases to cease their operation as well as stopping barter trading between east coast of Sabah and the neighbouring Philippines and Indonesia. Despite the second extension of the MCO announced on 10 April, the Sabah government has give relaxation to palm oil plantations and mills in six eastern Sabah districts of Kalabakan, Kinabatangan, Kunak, Lahad Datu, Semporna and Tawau to operate under certain conditions that need to be complied. Throughout the conditional movement control order, the operations of the state government agencies been resumed from 13 May to 9 June.

On 5 October, Security Minister Ismail Sabri Yaakob announced that the state capital Kota Kinabalu, Penampang, and Putatan would be placed under a Conditional Movement Control Oder (MCO) commencing 7 October. Under the conditional MCO, travel into these districts will be limited, express and transit buses will not be allowed to operate, and only essential services will be allowed to operate.

On 6 October, Senior Minister Ismail announced that the federal government would ban most interstate travel to and from Sabah with the exception of emergencies, deaths, and essential services. Travel would also be limited to Sabah natives, essential workers, civil servants working in Sabah, and permanent residents residing in Sabah.

On 7 May 2021, the Sabah state government banned any non-essential inter-district travel for the duration of the Conditional Movement Control Order (CMCO) between 10 and 16 May. Sabah Local Government and Housing Minister Datuk Seri Masidi Manjun also confirmed that Kota Kinabalu, Putatan and Penampang would be considered to be one district for the duration of the CMCO.

=== Quarantine and treatment centres ===
On 19 March, Sabah Assistant Minister of the local government and the Ministry of Housing Hiew Vun Zin said that there are a total of nine buildings in the People's Housing Program (PPR) Batu Putih in Sandakan District, three of which are blocks H, I and G will be serving as isolation centres. Each building has 100 units and each unit has 3 bedrooms. As long as they are tested as patients under investigation by the Health Bureau and Duchess of Kent Hospital, the authorities will send them and their families to the isolation centre for 14 days of isolation. At the time there is more than 30 people were being quarantined at the centre, including six families. The State Health Department has put a total of 350 beds on standby for coronavirus infected patient.

A total of RM2 million had been set by the Sabah government for the transformation of Likas Sports Complex into makeshift coronavirus medical facility as a branch of the Queen Elizabeth Hospital from a RM200 million fund allocated for infrastructure development in the state. This includes the upgrading of 39 premises that have been gazetted as quarantine centres for coronavirus and another 13 buildings in the midst of identifying as of April. The hall at the Likas Sports Complex will start operational by 27 April as a quarantine centre with the Sabah International Convention Centre (SICC) has also been identified as among further potential quarantine centres.

==== Shortage of coronavirus test kits reagents ====
Following reports of the shortage of coronavirus test kits reagents, the Sabah government has acquired an immediate supply of 5,000 reagents from Singapore on 3 April through a joint efforts between the state government and non-governmental organisation (NGOs) with another 5,000 arrived the following day. The reagents along with critically low medical supplies donated by the federal government specifically for medical frontliners in Sabah were flown through a Royal Malaysian Air Force (RMAF) flight. The state government also in the process to gather another 10,000 reagents has been announced by the state chief minister on 22 April.

== Aid to Sabah on the pandemic ==
=== Local aid ===
The Sabah state government has announced a total of RM670 million aid to help ease the burden of the people affected by the outbreak with 15 measures had been formulated under the package, involving three categories including assistance to frontliners staffs and the affected people. On 21 April, the Sabah State Legislative Assembly has passed the First Supplementary Supply (2020) Bill 2020, approving a further additional budget of RM553 million to help those affected by the pandemic in the state. The Sabah state government also has directed all its government-linked companies not to reduce or cut their staff salaries despite going through the current business slowdown due to the MCO.

The federal government had donated a total of 200,000 face masks, 50,000 gloves, 10,000 litres of sanitisers and a variety of medical equipments for frontliners in Sabah. On 10 April, a further 3 million surgical masks meant for the distribution to every home in Sabah were delivered by the federal government through another RMAF flight. Basic essential items aid also being extended by NGOs to families of illegal immigrants in the state following reports that they have been abandoned by irresponsible employer.

Several local individuals who requested anonymity has donated a total of 10,000 pieces of 3-ply surgical masks to hospitals around Sabah. Through the "Star Frontliners Initiative", a total of 150,000 surgical gloves were delivered to the frontliners in Sabah's Queen Elizabeth Hospital. Under the "Edge Covid-19 Equipment Fund", medical equipments such as breathing machines, ventilators and oxygen concentrators along with various personal protective equipments (PPEs) comprising 196,000 face masks, 4,840 protective gowns/suits and 1,200 face shields were delivered to hospitals around Sabah. Until April, the state government has received contributions worth RM11,380,000 in cash and other different kinds of donations from various state statutory bodies, NGOs and private sectors of the state in support of its efforts to stem the virus spread within Sabah.

=== Foreign aid ===
China's Consulate-General in Kota Kinabalu has announced that medical aid to be dispatched to Sabah to aid their struggle against the virus and reciprocate the people's of Sabah recent assistance to Mainland China. The first aid came to Sabah on 29 March, which consists of 83 boxes of face masks with 2,000 pieces before a further 170,000 boxes of face masks, personal equipments and sanitisers delivered directly to the Sabah state government. Another 20,000 surgical masks destined for Sabah's healthcare frontliner workers were delivered in early April.

Through the efforts and initiatives of the Sabah Ma-Zhong Friendship Association, a total of RM100,000 worth of medical aid and masks were delivered to Sabah frontliners comprising 10,000 pieces of 3-ply surgical masks from the Sichuan Federation of Returned Overseas Chinese, Sichuan Overseas Chinese Business Association, and Sichuan Tiandan Trading Co. Ltd., 5,000 pieces of N95 face masks from the Fujian Provincial People's Association for Friendship with Foreign Countries and another 400 pieces of KN95 face masks from the Shanxi Provincial Federation of Returned Overseas Chinese and Shanxi Overseas Exchanges Association. Chinese medical experts specialised in respirology, intensive care, psychiatry, infectious diseases, data analysis, virology and traditional Chinese medicine (TCM) also being dispatched to Sabah to share their expertise in dealing with the virus with some of the expertise has experience throughout the coronavirus pandemic in Hubei Province.

Filipino residents in Sabah are being channelled monetary aid by the Filipino government through the "DOLE-AKAP Cash Assistance" while Indonesian residents in the state were also given aid through their government consulate-general office in the form of essential items aid.

== See also ==
- COVID-19 pandemic in Sarawak
- COVID-19 pandemic in Malaysia
