= Hartal =

Strike action associated with South Asia

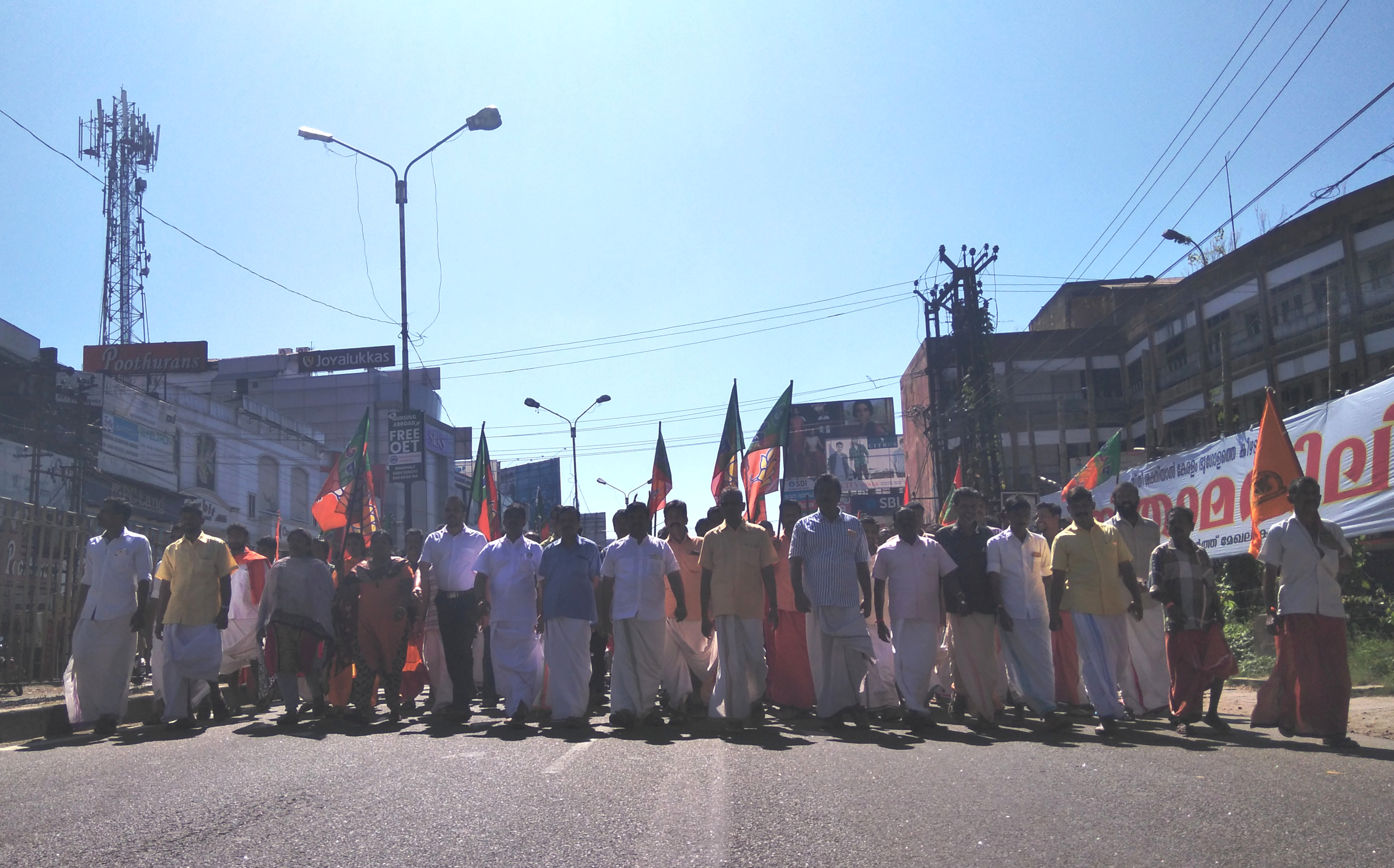
Bharatiya Janata Party (BJP) protesters marching in Angamaly during a hartal against the entry of women into the Sabarimala Temple (January 3, 2019).

Hartal (pronounced [ɦəɽ.t̪aːl]) is a term in many Indian languages for a strike action that was first used during the Indian independence movement (also known as the nationalist movement) of the early 20th century. A hartal is a mass protest, often involving a total shutdown of workplaces, offices, shops, and courts of law, and a form of civil disobedience similar to a labour strike. In addition to being a general strike, it involves the voluntary closure of schools and places of business. It is a mode of appealing to the sympathies of a government to reverse an unpopular or unacceptable decision. A hartal is often used for political reasons, for example by an opposition party protesting against a governmental policy or action.

The term comes from Gujarati (હડતાળ, haḍtāḷ, or હડતાલ, haḍtāl), signifying the closing down of shops and warehouses with the goal of satisfying a demand. Mahatma Gandhi, who hailed from Gujarat, used the term to refer to his pro-independence general strikes, effectively institutionalizing the term.

Hartal is step 118 in Gene Sharp's 198 Methods of Nonviolent Action.

== History ==
The contemporary origins of this form of public protest date back to the colonial period of Indian history. Unpopular policies, particular regarding taxation by the colonial authorities and princely states often triggered such localized public protests, as in Benares (present day Varanasi) and Bardoli.

=== In South Asia ===
Hartals are still common in India, Pakistan, Bangladesh, and in parts of Sri Lanka, where the term is often used to refer specifically to the 1953 Ceylonese Hartal.

==== Bangladesh ====
Hartals in Bangladesh are sometimes held for more than 200 days. Bangladesh's law states that hartals are legal as long as violence is avoided. This law was formulated due to the notable lawsuit Khondker Modarresh Elahi vs. Government of Bangladesh (2001).

=== In Southeast Asia ===
The word is used to refer to various general strikes in the 1940s, the 1950s, and the 1960s such as the All-Malaya Hartal of 1947 and the 1967 Penang Hartal riot.

The term was revived in modern Malaysia to the Hartal Doktor Kontrak, a strike by doctors in July 2021 during the COVID-19 pandemic in response to the lack of permanent employment opportunities provided for them.

== See also ==
- Gherao
- Dharna
- Bandh
- Raasta roko
- Rail roko
- List of hartal in Bangladesh
- Political activism in Kerala
- Rowlatt Act (1919)
