= 13 May incident =

1969 Sino-Malay sectarian violence in Kuala Lumpur

13 May Incident; Peristiwa 13 Mei; ڤريستيوا 13 مي; 五一三事件; 13 மே சம்பவம்
- Part of 1969 Malaysian general election
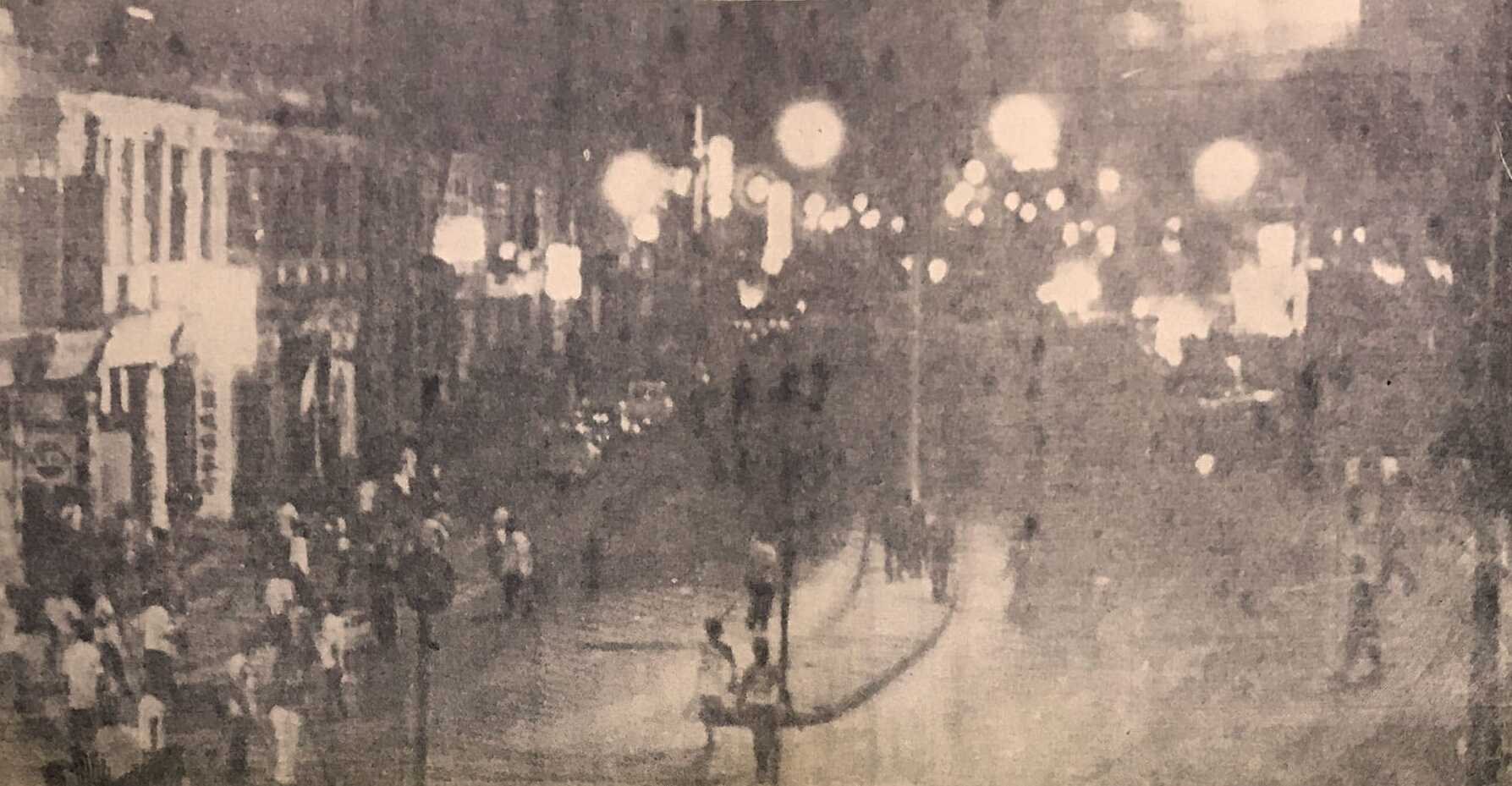
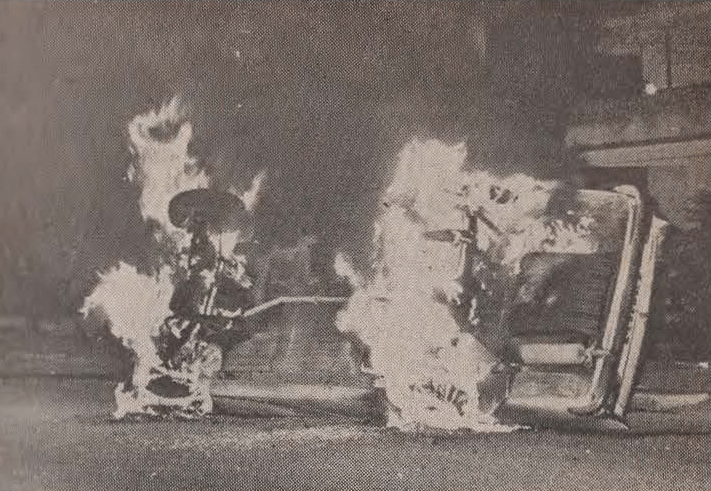
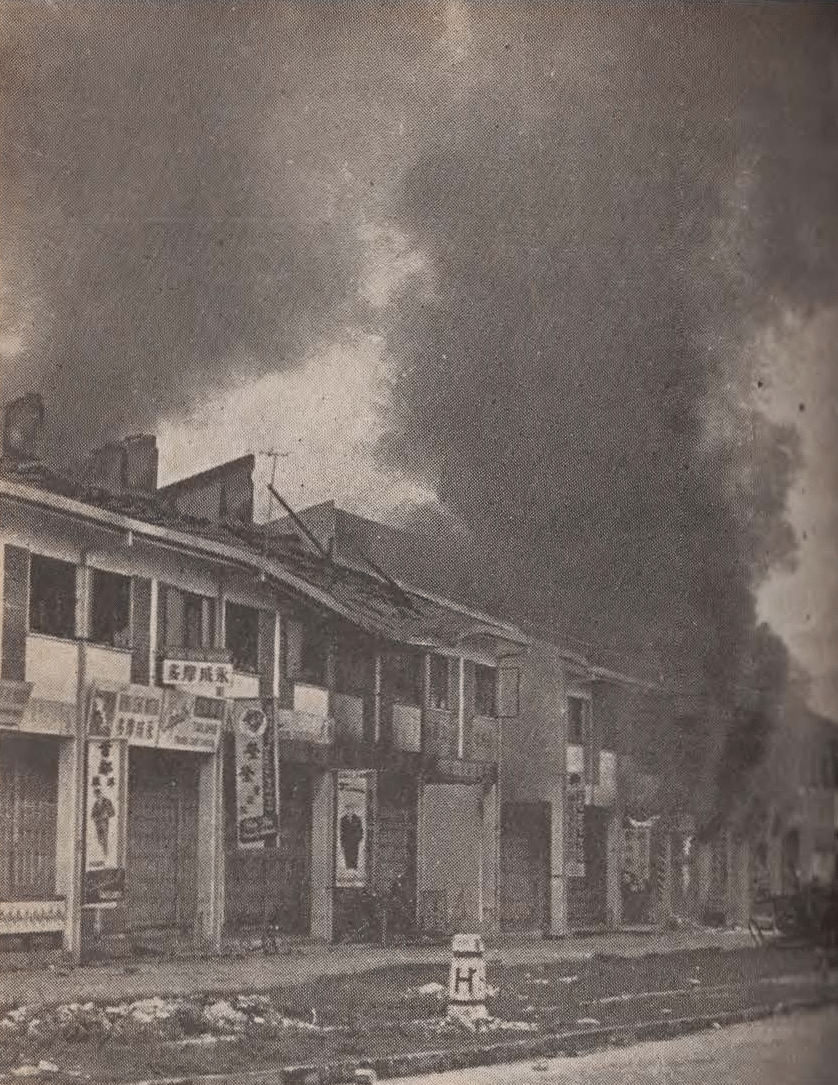
- Crowds on Jalan Tuanku Abdul Rahman, with the flames of a burning car and shophouse (top); Cars at Jalan Raja Muda were overturned and set ablaze (bottom left); Shophouses set on fire in Kampung Pandan (bottom right)
- Date: 13 May 1969; 57 years ago
- Location: Kuala Lumpur, Malaysia
- Caused by: Results of the 1969 Malaysian general election, when the ruling Alliance Party lost seats to the Chinese-majority Democratic Action Party and Parti Gerakan
- Methods: Widespread rioting, looting, assault, arson, protests, property damage, murder
- Result: Declaration of a state of emergency by the Yang di-Pertuan Agong: Suspension of Parliament; Temporary establishment of the National Operations Council; Resignation of Tunku Abdul Rahman as prime minister; Implementation of Rukun Negara; Implementation of New Economic Policy; Increased racial tensions between the ethnic groups of the country; Eventual formation of Barisan Nasional

Parties
UMNO supporters; Malaysian Malay civilians	Malaysian Chinese and Indian civilians	Government of Malaysia; Royal Malaysia Police; Federal Reserve Unit; General Operations Force; Malaysian Armed Forces; Malaysian Army; Royal Malay Regiment

Lead figures
Harun Idris		Mohamed Salleh Ismael; Tunku Osman

Casualties and losses
25 killed (official figure, disputed)	143 killed (official figure, disputed); 600 killed (other source); 3,500 refugees	Unknown

The 13 May incident was a period of violent ethnic conflict that erupted in Kuala Lumpur, Malaysia, on 13 May 1969, following that year's general election. The clashes primarily involved the Malay and Chinese communities and were caused by political and ethnic tensions after opposition parties such as the Democratic Action Party and Parti Gerakan Rakyat Malaysia made substantial electoral gains in the election, challenging the dominance of the ruling Alliance Party.

In response, the king, on the government's advice, declared a state of emergency, suspended parliament, and entrusted civilian administration to the National Operations Council under Deputy Prime Minister Abdul Razak Hussein. While official sources cited 196 fatalities, other sources suggest the toll was much higher—from nearly 600 to over a thousand, with most victims being Chinese. Thousands were injured or displaced, and curfews were enforced to restore order.

The event was significant in Malaysian politics, as it forced the first prime minister, Tunku Abdul Rahman, to step down from office and hand power to Abdul Razak Hussein. It was also a pivotal moment that reshaped Malaysia's socioeconomic policies, as Abdul Razak's government shifted their domestic policies to favour Malays with the implementation of the New Economic Policy, and the UMNO restructured the political system to advance Malay dominance through affirmative action in accordance with the ideology of Ketuanan Melayu (lit. 'Malay supremacy').

The incident has remained a sensitive and, at times, taboo topic in Malaysian society, with open discussion often avoided due to prevailing political sensitivities. Ethnic relations between the Malay and Chinese communities have stabilised since the incident but remain fragile, occasionally strained by political rhetoric and socioeconomic disparities.

== Precursors ==
=== Ethnic divide ===
On 31 August 1957, Malaya gained its independence from colonial rule. The country, however, suffered from a sharp division of wealth between the Chinese, who dominated most urban areas and were perceived to be in control of a large portion of the nation's economy, and the Malays, who were generally poorer and lived in more rural areas. The special privileged position of Malay political power, however, is guaranteed under Article 153 of the constitution, written during Malayan independence.

There were heated debates between Malay groups wanting radical measures to institutionalise Malay supremacy (Ketuanan Melayu), while Chinese groups called for their "racial" interest to be protected, and non-Malay opposition party members arguing for a 'Malaysian Malaysia' rather than Malay privilege. In 1963, amid a background of racial tension, Malaysia was formed as a federation that incorporated Malaya (Peninsular Malaysia), Singapore, North Borneo, and Sarawak.

There had been several incidents of racial conflict between Malays and Chinese before the 1969 riots. For example, in Penang, hostility between the races turned into violence during the centenary celebration of George Town in 1957, which resulted in several days of fighting and several deaths, and there were further disturbances in 1959 and 1964 as well as a riot in 1967, which originated as a protest against currency devaluation but turned into racial killings. In Singapore, antagonism between the races led to the 1964 race riots, which contributed to the separation of Singapore from Malaysia on 9 August 1965.

=== 1969 national election ===
In the 1969 general election, the governing coalition of the Alliance Party faced a strong challenge from opposition parties, in particular the two newly formed and mainly Chinese parties, the Democratic Action Party (DAP) and Parti Gerakan. The election was preceded by outbreaks of racial incidents that contributed to a tense atmosphere. A Malay political worker was killed by a Chinese gang in Penang, while a Chinese Labour Party activist was shot and killed in a clash with police in Kuala Lumpur. Radical opponents called for a boycott of the election and threatened violence, but the funeral procession of the shot activist, which drew large crowds of more than ten thousand and was held before election day, passed largely peacefully despite a number of disruptive incidents.

The general election was held on 10 May 1969, without any incidents. The result showed that the Alliance had won less than half of the popular vote, a major setback for the ruling coalition. On the national level, the Alliance had gained a majority of seats in parliament, albeit a significantly reduced one. The number of seats won by the Chinese component of the Alliance, the Malaysian Chinese Association, had been reduced by half. On the state level, the Alliance had only gained the majority in Selangor by co-operating with the sole independent candidate as the opposition had tied with the Alliance for control of the Selangor state legislature (although immediately after the election, it was unclear that the Alliance would still have control). The Alliance lost control of Kelantan (to the Pan-Malaysian Islamic Party) and Perak, and the opposition Gerakan won control of the state government in Penang.

=== Post-election celebrations ===
On the nights of 11 and 12 May, the DAP and Gerakan celebrated their success in the election, with permission being sought by Tan Chee Khoon from the police. In particular, a large Gerakan procession welcomed the Gerakan leader, V. David. Opposition parades passed through Malay communities such as Kampung Baru and were alleged to be highly provocative, with non-Malays taunting Malays while bearing slogans such as "Semua Melayu kasi habis" (finish off all the Malays) and "Kuala Lumpur sekarang Cina punya" (Kuala Lumpur now belongs to the Chinese). Some opposition supporters were said to have driven past the residence of the Selangor chief minister and demanded that he abandon the house in favour of a Chinese person.

Celebrations by opposition parties were seen as an attack on Malay political power. Although the election results still favoured the Malays despite losses, the Malay newspaper Utusan Melayu suggested in an editorial that the results had jeopardised the future of Malay rule and that prompt action was required to shore it up. On 12 May, members of UMNO Youth indicated to Selangor's Menteri Besar, Harun Idris, that they wanted to hold a victory parade. UMNO then announced a procession that would start from Idris's residence. Tunku Abdul Rahman would later call the retaliatory parade "inevitable, as otherwise the party members would be demoralised after the show of strength by the Opposition and the insults that had been thrown at them". Malays were brought from the rural areas into Kuala Lumpur, which was then a predominantly Chinese city. Thousands of Malays, some of them armed, arrived to join the parade.

== Rioting ==
=== Early events ===
The UMNO procession was planned for 7:30 pm on 13 May. That morning, Malays began to gather at the residence of Harun Idris on Jalan Raja Muda, on the edge of Kampung Baru, although some were already there as early as Sunday evening. They came from various parts of the state, such as Morib (Harun's constituency) and Banting, and some were said to have came from parts of Perak. According to the National Operations Council's (NOC) official report, at around 6:30 pm, fistfights broke out in Setapak between a group of Malays from Gombak travelling to the rally and Chinese bystanders who taunted them, and this escalated into bottle- and stone-throwing. News of the fighting then reached the gathering crowd in Jalan Raja Muda, and shortly before 6:30 pm, many Malays broke off from the rallying point at Idris's house and headed through adjoining Chinese sections. The Malays, armed with parangs and kris, burned cars and shops, killed, and looted in the Chinese areas. According to Time, at least eight Chinese people were killed in the initial attack. Once violence broke out, it spread rapidly and uncontrollably throughout the city within 45 minutes, to Jalan Campbell, Jalan Tuanku Abdul Rahman (Batu Road), Kampung Datuk Keramat, Kampung Pandan, Cheras, and Kampung Kerinchi.

=== Retaliations and armed response ===
According to John Slimming, who wrote an account of the riot in 1969, the Chinese were taken by surprise and did not retaliate for more than an hour. The NOC's official report, however, suggested that Chinese secret society elements had prepared for trouble and were in action when the violence started in Kampung Baru. On Batu Road, Chinese and Indian shopkeepers began to form themselves into an improvised defence force, while a Malay mob attempting to storm the Chow Kit Road area was met with armed secret society gang members and ran. The Chinese attacked Malays who were found in Chinese areas, and Malay patrons in cinemas were singled out and killed. The Chinese also attempted to burn down the UMNO headquarters on Batu Road and besieged the Salak South police station. The Sungai Besi police station was attacked, by mobs of unknown ethnicity, according to a report in The Straits Times.

Early in the evening, the rioters were met by police, who used tear gas in an attempt to control them. A 24-hour curfew for Kuala Lumpur was imposed at 7:00 pm. Later, between 8:30 and 9:00 pm, a shoot-to-kill order was given by Inspector General of Police Mohamed Salleh bin Ismael. This was followed by another shoot-to-kill order from the Chief of Armed Forces, General Tunku Osman Jiwa. The army was deployed, and they entered the areas affected by rioting at around 10:00 pm. Many people who were unaware of the curfew order were shot. Some were also shot while standing in their own doorways and gardens. Foreign correspondents reported seeing members of the Royal Malay Regiment firing into Chinese shophouses for no apparent reason.

By 5:00 am the next morning, the authorities at Kuala Lumpur Hospital reported that there were about 80 dead at the facility. Members of the hospital staff also reported that the initial casualties between 7:00 and 8:30 pm had all been Chinese suffering from parang slashes and stab wounds, but that between 8:30 and 10:30 pm, the victims were equally divided between Chinese and Malays. However, after about 10:30 pm, the casualties were almost all Chinese, with nearly all of them suffering from gunshot wounds.

=== Later events ===
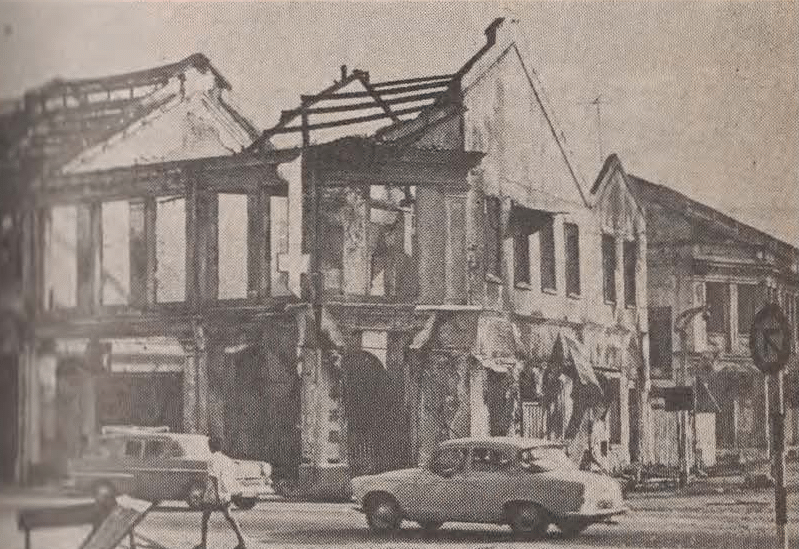
Burnt-out shophouses on Jalan Campbell

The army gathered at crucial road junctions and patrolled the main streets, but even though a curfew had been announced, young men in areas such as Kampung Baru and Pudu ignored the order. Although most of the killings occurred on Tuesday night and Wednesday morning, the burning and looting of Chinese shops and houses by Malays continued, with most incidents of serious arson occurring on Thursday night and Friday; over 450 houses were burnt. People displaced by the riots, most of them Chinese, were sent to official refugee centres in different parts of town—the Malays to Stadium Negara and the Chinese to Stadium Merdeka, Chinwoo Stadium, and Shaw Road School. By Sunday, the number of Chinese refugees had increased to 3,500 in Merdeka Stadium, 1,500 in Chinwoo Stadium, and 800 in Shaw Road School, while the Malays in Stadium Negara had decreased from 650 on Thursday to 250 on Sunday. Over a thousand refugees were still left in Merdeka Stadium a month after the riot.

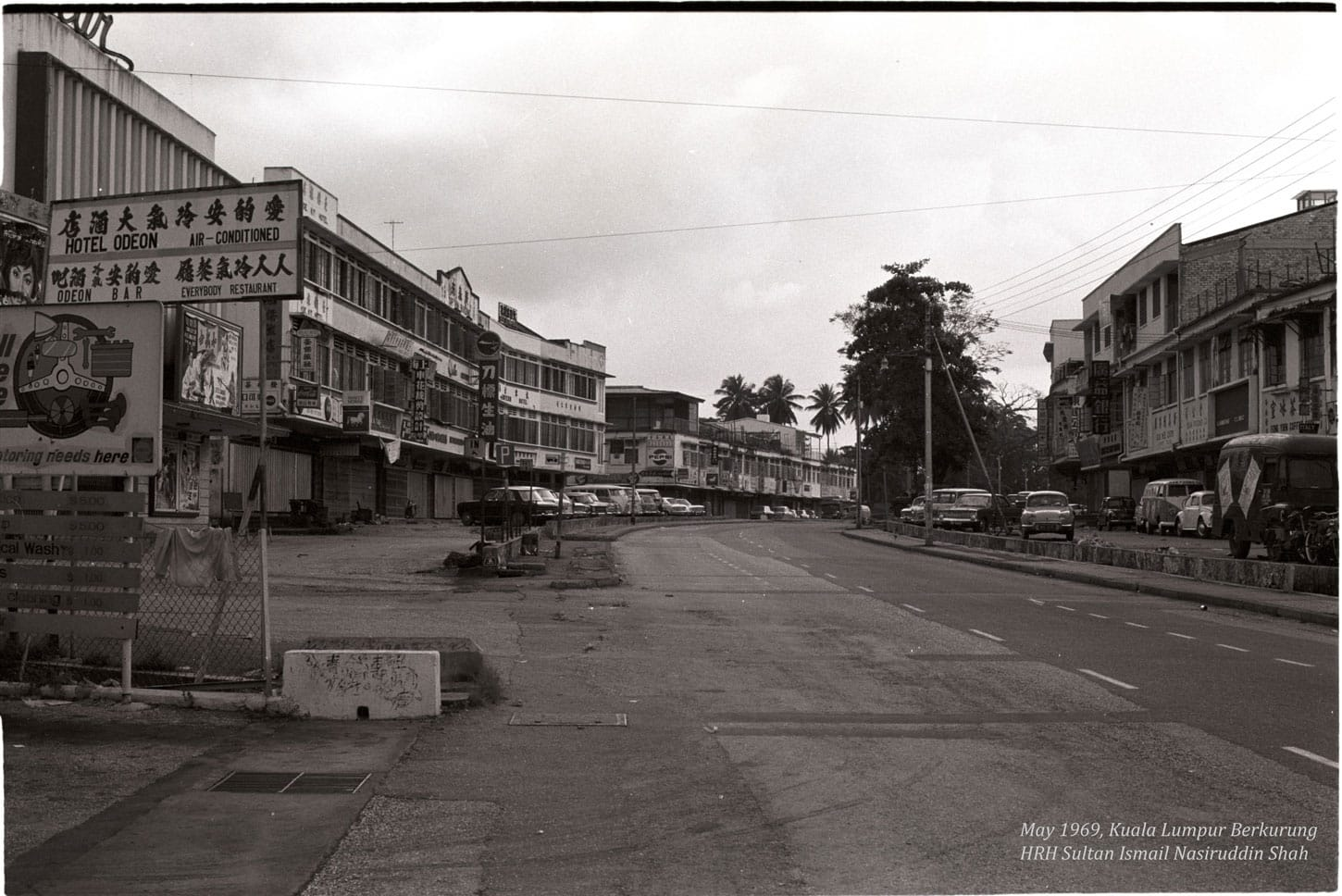
Jalan Pasar in Pudu under curfew

The curfew was relaxed briefly but quickly reimposed on Thursday morning. It was lifted again for three hours on Saturday morning. The curfew was gradually relaxed as the situation slowly returned to normal, but by the end of the month, it was still in force from 3:00 pm until 6:30 am.

The violence was concentrated in urban areas, and except for minor disturbances in Malacca, Perak, Penang, and neighbouring Singapore, where the populations of Chinese people were larger, the rest of the country remained calm.

On 28 June 1969, rioting broke out again in Sentul when Malays attacked Indians, and 15 were killed.

=== Casualties ===
According to disputed police figures, a total of 196 people were killed in the riots. The official figures gave 143 of the dead as Chinese, 25 Malay, 13 Indian, and 15 others (undetermined), although unofficial figures suggested a higher number of Chinese deaths. The police were authorised to bury any dead bodies found or dispose of them in any way they could without inquests or inquiries, and many of these were disposed of undocumented, which made estimation of the number of deaths difficult. Some were reported to have been thrown into the Klang River, and some were believed to have been disposed of in pools in tin mines. A mass burial of the victims was also captured on film at the Sungai Buloh leper colony near Kuala Lumpur. Western diplomatic sources at that time put the toll at close to 600, and Slimming estimated the number to be around 800 in the first week by including hundreds who were officially missing; other observers and correspondents suggested four-figure numbers.

According to official figures, 439 individuals were also recorded as injured. 753 cases of arson were logged, and 211 vehicles were destroyed or severely damaged.

== Immediate effects ==
Immediately after the riot, the government assumed emergency powers and suspended parliament, which would reconvene again in 1971. It also briefly suspended the press and established the National Operations Council (NOC).

=== Declaration of emergency ===
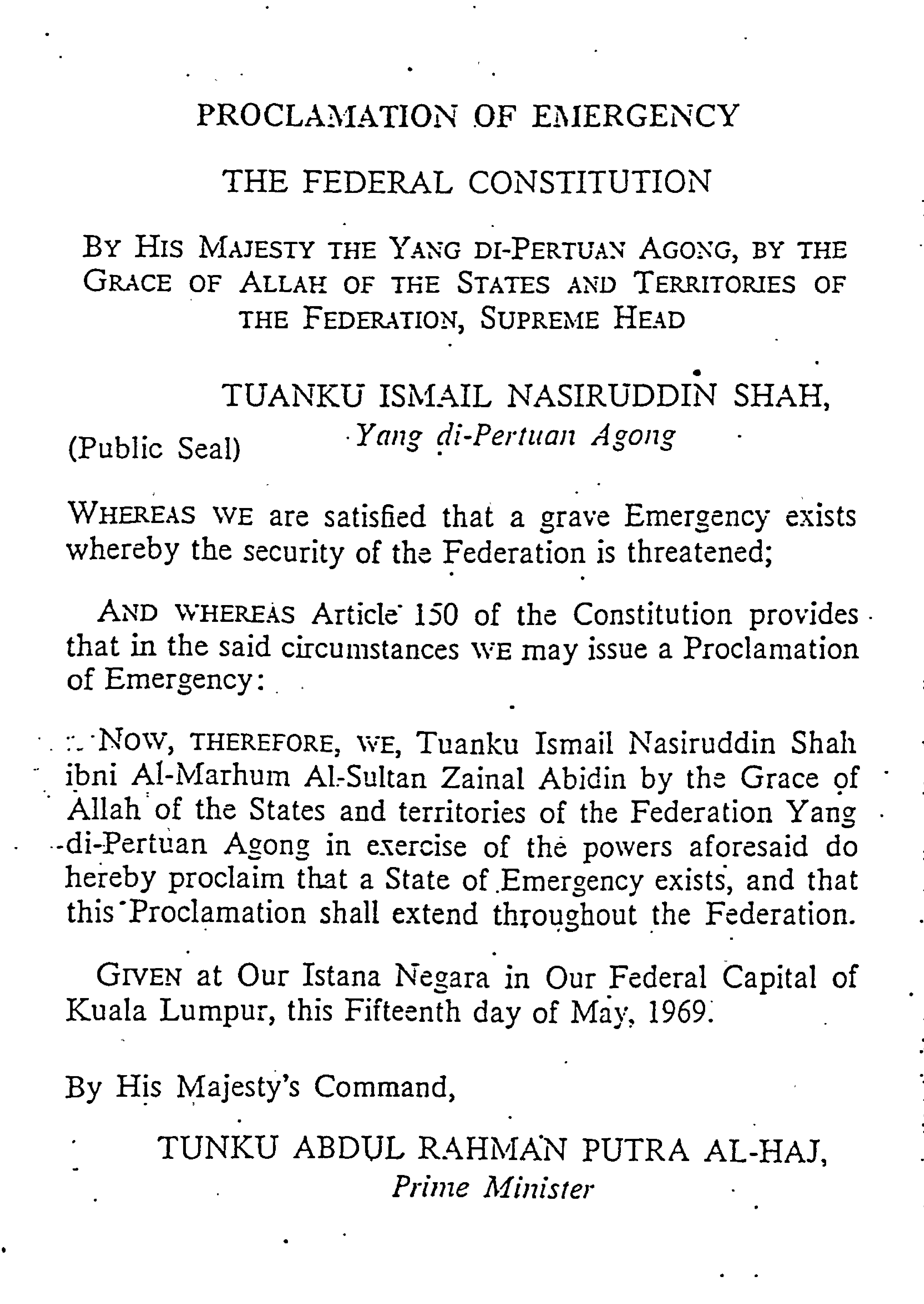
The Proclamation of Emergency issued by the Yang di-Pertuan Agong on 15 May 1969.

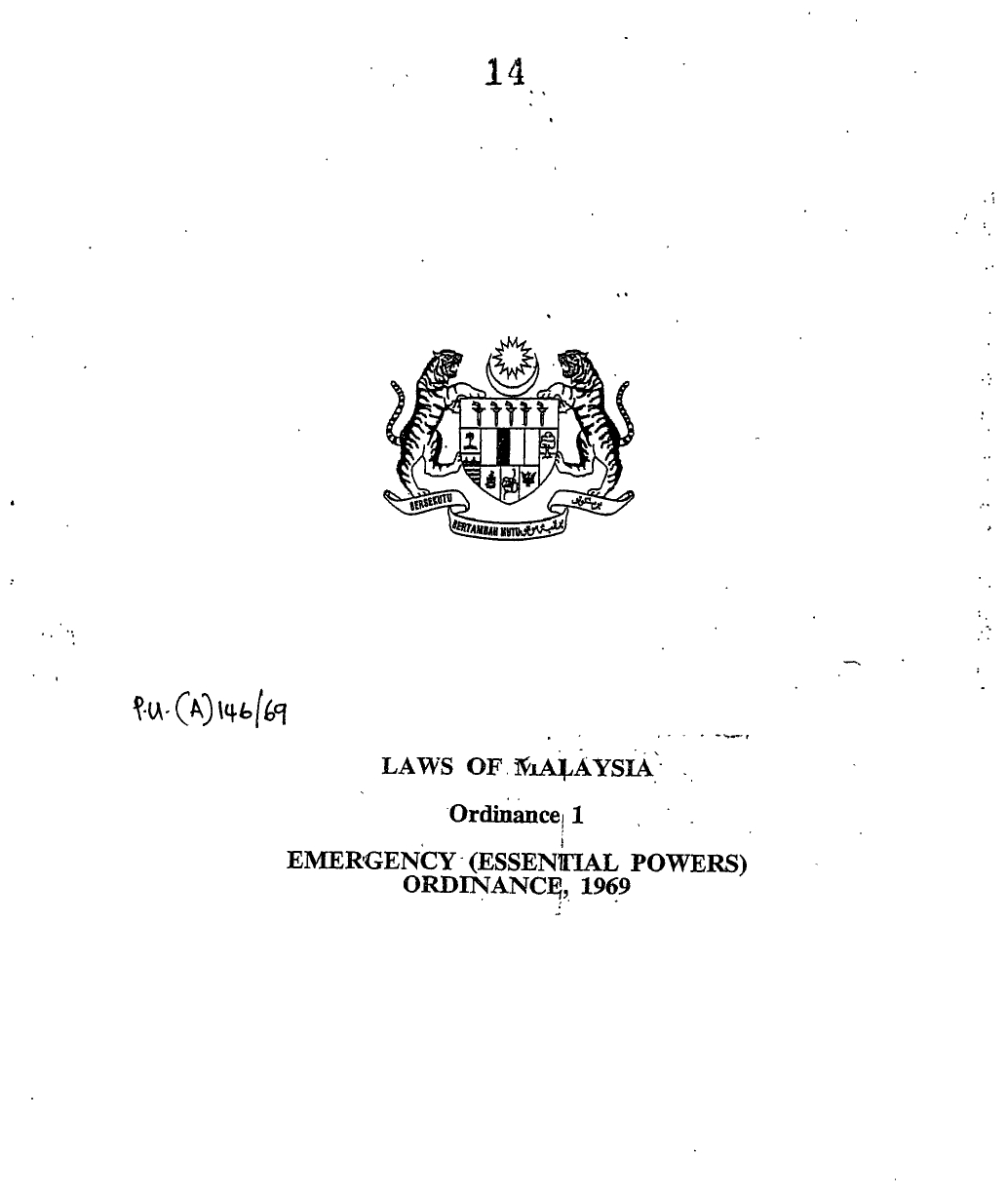
The first emergency ordinance issued after the emergency proclamation

On 13 May, in the wake of the riots, the home minister, through the Public Order (Preservation) Act 1958, declared the police districts of Kuala Lumpur, Petaling Jaya, Kuala Langat, Klang, Kuala Selangor, Kuala Kubu Bharu, Rawang, and Kajang as areas in a "state of danger to public order", which granted the police wide-ranging powers to impose curfew, ban assemblies, cordon off areas, and erect barricades. The next day, the danger area was expanded to cover the entirety of Peninsular Malaysia.

On 15 and 16 May, a state of emergency and accompanying curfew were declared throughout the country. On 15 May, the NOC, also known as the Majlis Gerakan Negara, headed by Abdul Razak Hussein, was established following the proclamation of emergency by the king of Malaysia, Ismail Nasiruddin of Terengganu. Parts of the constitution were also suspended. On the same day, the king proclaimed the whole country as a "security area" under the Internal Security Act 1960, which rendered anyone caught with unlicensed firearms in the country to be liable to the death penalty.

With parliament suspended, the NOC became the supreme decision-making body for the next 18 months. State and District Operations Councils took over state and local governments. The NOC implemented security measures to restore law and order in the country, including the establishment of an unarmed vigilante corps, a territorial army, and police force battalions. Abdul Razak, as the director of the NOC, also called out military reservists to aid in the restoration of public order.

Newspaper publications were suspended on 15 May but resumed on 18 May, and a new censorship law was gazetted on 21 May. Foreign publications were banned, citizens found in possession of foreign news clippings were detained, and foreign reporters were criticised over allegations of racial bias by the army. The restoration of order in the country was gradually achieved. Curfews continued in most parts of the country but were gradually scaled back. Peace was restored in the affected areas within two months. In February 1971, parliamentary rule was re-established. However, the emergency proclamation was only annulled by the parliament in December 2011, 42 years later, with all remaining emergency ordinances lapsing in June 2012.

== Official assessment ==
The NOC released a report on 9 October 1969, which cited "racial politics" as the primary cause of the riots, but it was reluctant to assign blame to the Malays.

The Malays who already felt excluded in the country's economic life, now began to feel a threat in their place in the public services. No mention was ever made by non-Malay politicians of the almost closed-door attitude to the Malays by non-Malays in large sections of the private sector in this country.

Certain non-Malay racialist election speakers constantly worked up non-Malay passions against Malay policemen and officers, alleging partial treatment of the enforcement of the law. They contributed directly to the breakdown in respect for the law and authority amongst sections of the non-Malay communities.

It also attributed the cause of the riots in part to both the Malayan Communist Party and secret societies:

The eruption of violence on 13 May was the result of an interplay of forces... These include a generation gap and differences in interpretation of the constitutional structure by the different races in the country...; the incitement, intemperate statements and provocative behaviours of certain racialist party members and supporters during the recent General Election; the part played by the Malayan Communist Party (MCP) and secret societies in inciting racial feelings and suspicion; and the anxious, and later desperate, mood of the Malays with a background of Sino-Malay distrust, and recently, just after the General Elections, as a result of racial insults and threat to their future survival in their own country'

— Extract from The 13 May Tragedy, a report by the National Operations Council, October 1969.

It however said that the "trouble turned out to be a communal clash between the Malays and the Chinese" rather than an instance of communist insurgency. The report also denied rumours of lack of evenhandedness by the security forces in their handling of the crisis.

Tunku Abdul Rahman, in a book released two weeks before the report, blamed the opposition parties for the violence, as well as the influence of the communists, and thought that the incidents were sparked by Chinese communist youths. He absolved the majority of the Malays, Chinese, and Indians of any responsibility and considered the Malays who converged in Kuala Lumpur on 13 May to be merely responding to "intolerable provocations".

== Aftermath ==
The Rukun Negara, the de facto Malaysian oath of allegiance, was a reaction to the riot. It was introduced on 31 August 1970 as a way to foster unity among Malaysians.

The Malay nationalist Mahathir Mohamad, who was then a lesser-known politician and lost his seat as an UMNO candidate in the 10 May election, blamed the riot on the government and especially on Prime Minister Tunku Abdul Rahman for being "simple-minded" and not planning for a prosperous Malaysia where the Malays have a share of the economic stake. Abdul Rahman in turn blamed "extremists" such as Mahathir for the racial clashes, which led to Mahathir's expulsion from UMNO. This propelled him to write his seminal work The Malay Dilemma, in which he posited a solution to Malaysia's racial tensions based on aiding the Malays economically through an affirmative action programme.

After the riots, Abdul Rahman was forced into the background, with the day-to-day running of the country handed to the deputy prime minister, Abdul Razak Hussein, who was also the director of the NOC. On 22 September 1970, when the parliament reconvened, Abdul Rahman resigned his position as prime minister, and Razak Hussein took over.

In his 2007 book, May 13: Declassified Documents on the Malaysian Riots of 1969, Kua Kia Soong argued that, based on declassified British embassy dispatches, the riot was a coup d'état staged against Tunku Abdul Rahman by UMNO political leaders in association with the army and the police. He characterised the 13 May incident as more than spontaneous communal unrest, arguing that it reflected deeper structural inequalities and manipulation that was exploited by political elites to justify a consolidation of Malay political ascendancy.

Malaysian academic Shamsul Amri Baharuddin has critiqued essentialist narratives of Malay identity and highlighted how the incident helped propagate constructed notions of "Malayness" that reinforced state policies and public discourse.

In an attempt to form a broader coalition, the Barisan Nasional was formed in place of the Alliance Party, with former opposition parties such as Gerakan, PPP, and PAS invited to join the coalition.

After the 1969 riot, UMNO also began to restructure the political system to reinforce its power. It advanced its own version of Ketuanan Melayu, whereby "the politics of this country has been, and must remain for the foreseeable future, native [i.e., Malay] based: that was the secret of our stability and our prosperity and that is a fact of political life which no one can simply wish away." This principle of Ketuanan Melayu has been repeatedly used in successive elections by UMNO to galvanise Malay support for the party, and it remained the guiding principle of successive governments.

== Burials ==
There are two burial grounds for the victims of the riot, one in the Sungai Buloh leprosarium compound and the other in the Taman Ibukota Muslim Cemetery in Gombak.

According to the NOC report, 103 victims were buried in Sungai Buloh, of which 99 were Chinese; 2 were Indian; and 2 were Malay. They were interred between 18 May and 2 June 1969. Among the 103 victims, 18 were marked as "unidentified", with only their ethnicity, sex, and date of death specified on the tombstones. However, some contemporary news reports have put the total count of tombstones in Sungai Buloh at either 102, 112, or 114.

18 victims were interred at Taman Ibukota Muslim Cemetery on 18 May 1969, based on the NOC report. According to the cemetery record, however, only 11 victims of the riot were buried.

In 2017, illegal land clearing was carried out near the Sungai Buloh burial site, with the intention to develop it into a parking lot, which was stopped by the authorities after it attracted public attention from civil society groups. Since then, there have been multiple calls for the government to preserve the cemetery and declare it a heritage site. In September 2024, the Selangor government gazetted the Sungai Buloh burial ground as a reserved land for a non-Muslim cemetery and placed it under the care of the Friends of Kuala Lumpur and Selangor Heritage Association, a non-governmental organisation.

== See also ==
- 1964 race riots in Singapore
- 1969 race riots of Singapore, spillover from the 13 May incident
- May 1998 riots of Indonesia, a similar incident
- 2001 Kampung Medan riots
- Operation Lalang
- Snow in Midsummer, a 2023 historical drama film evoking the events of 13 May
