= JSAD =

JSAD may stand for:

- Japanese School in Abu Dhabi, a Japanese-language international school
- Journal of South Asian Development, a triannual development studies journal
- Journal of Studies on Alcohol and Drugs, a scientific journal for research into drug use
