= Political activism in Kerala =

Overview of the political activisim in Kerala, India

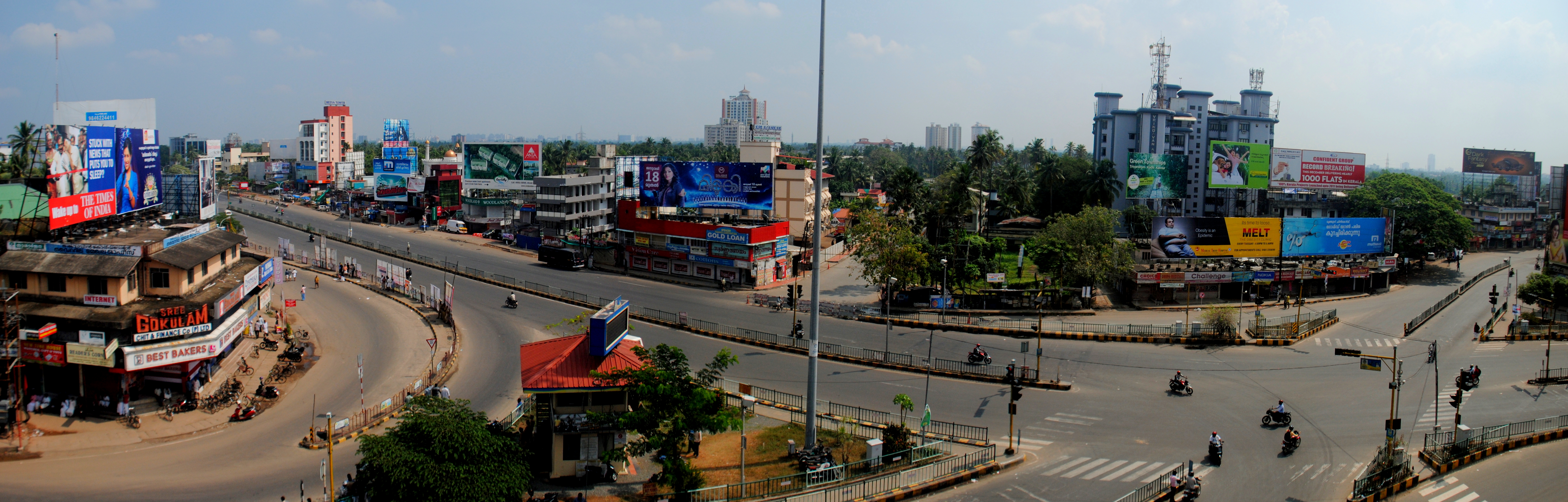
Vyttila junction during a hartal

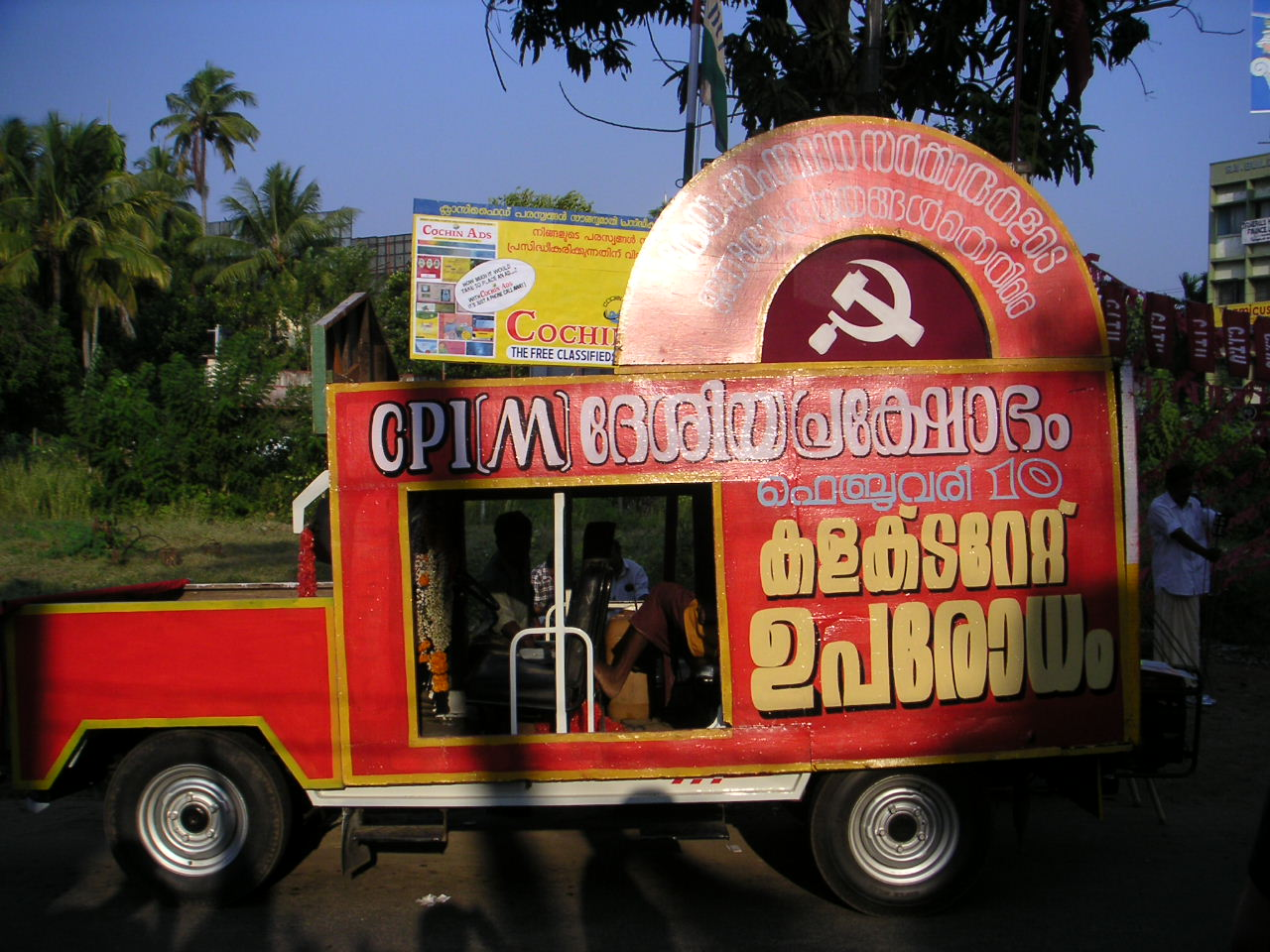
SIgnboard by CPI(M) for blockading the Ernakulam Collectorate

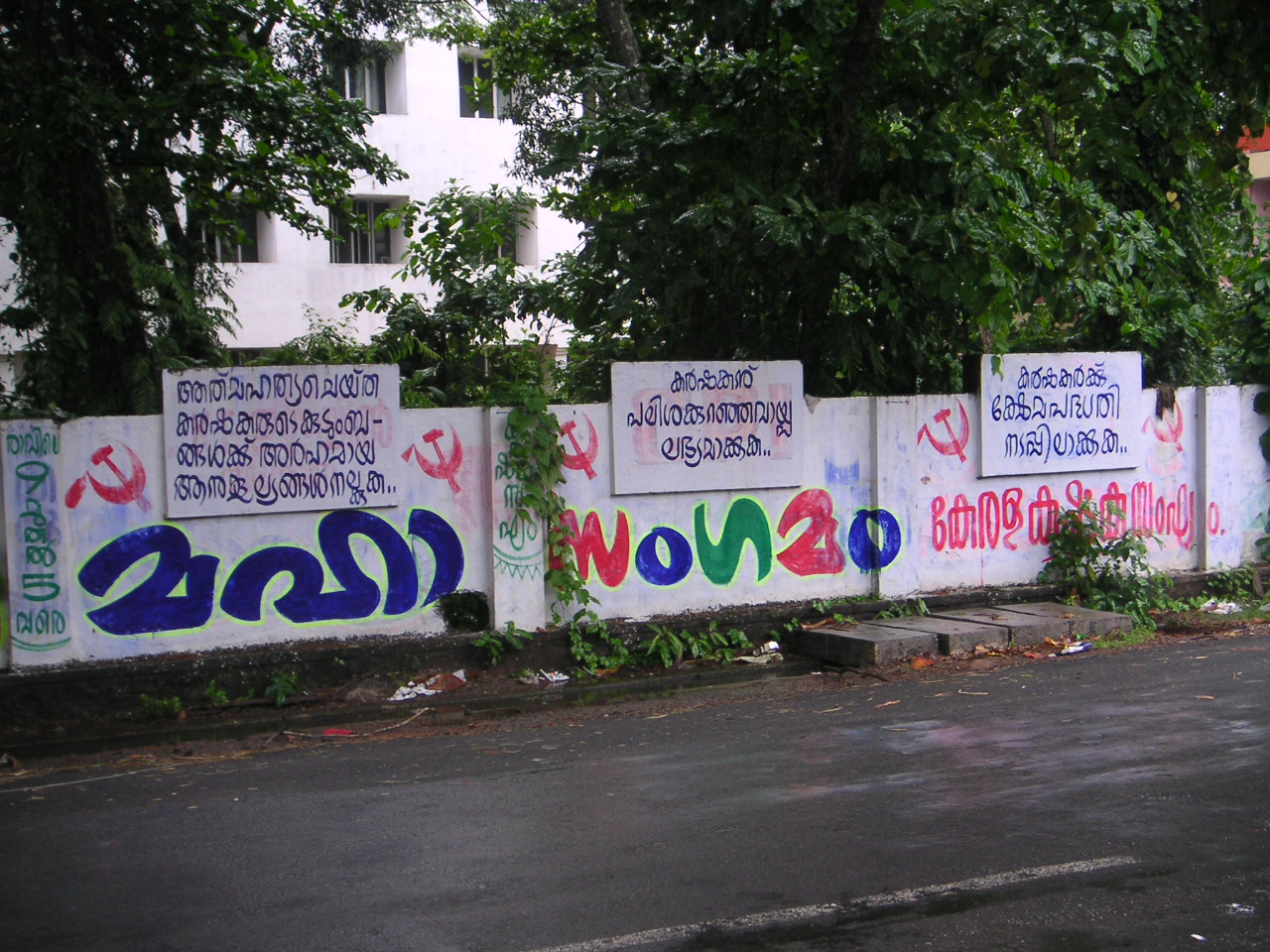
Mural by Farmers' Union, Alappuzha

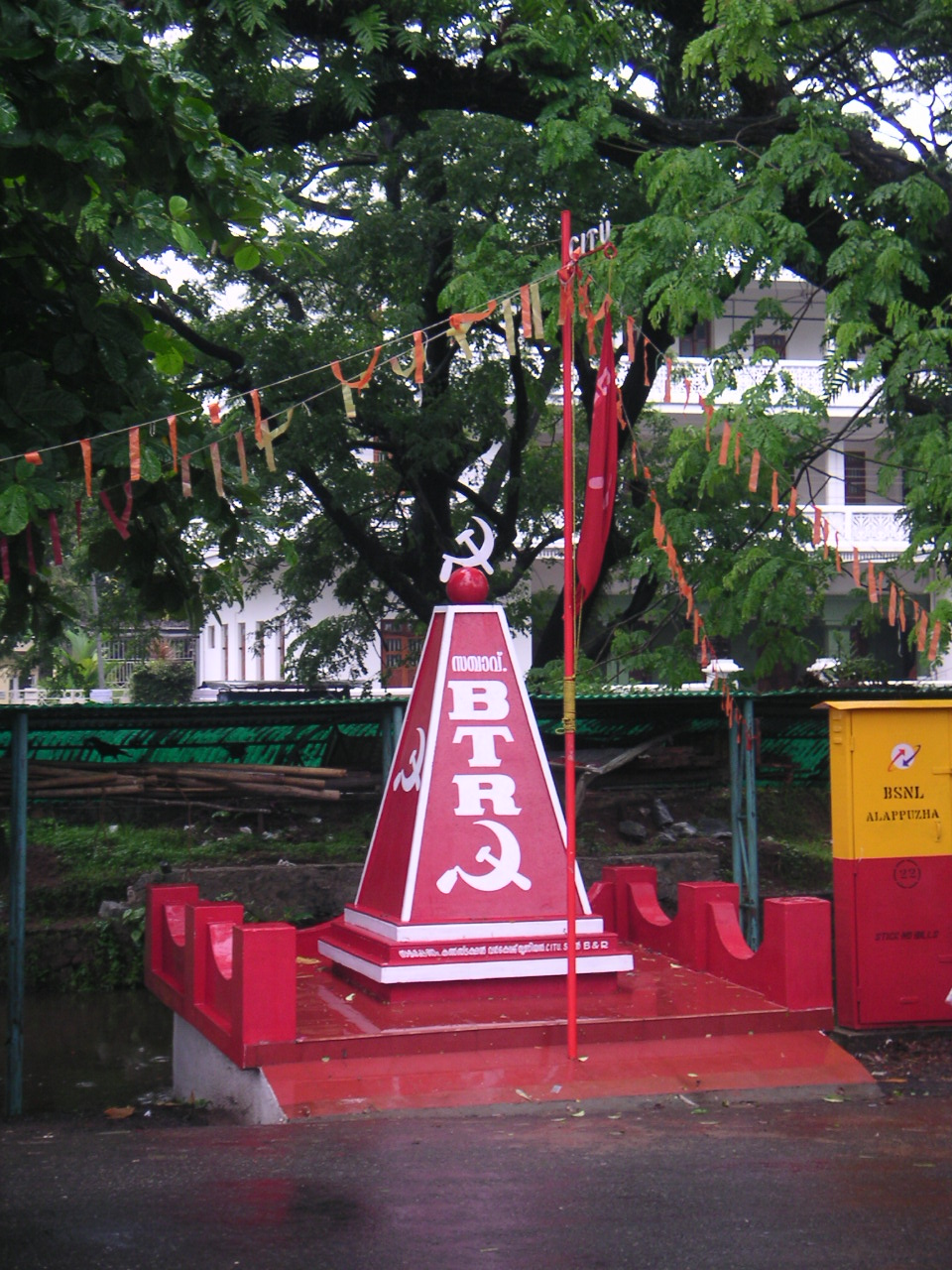
Ranadive Memorial, Alappuzha

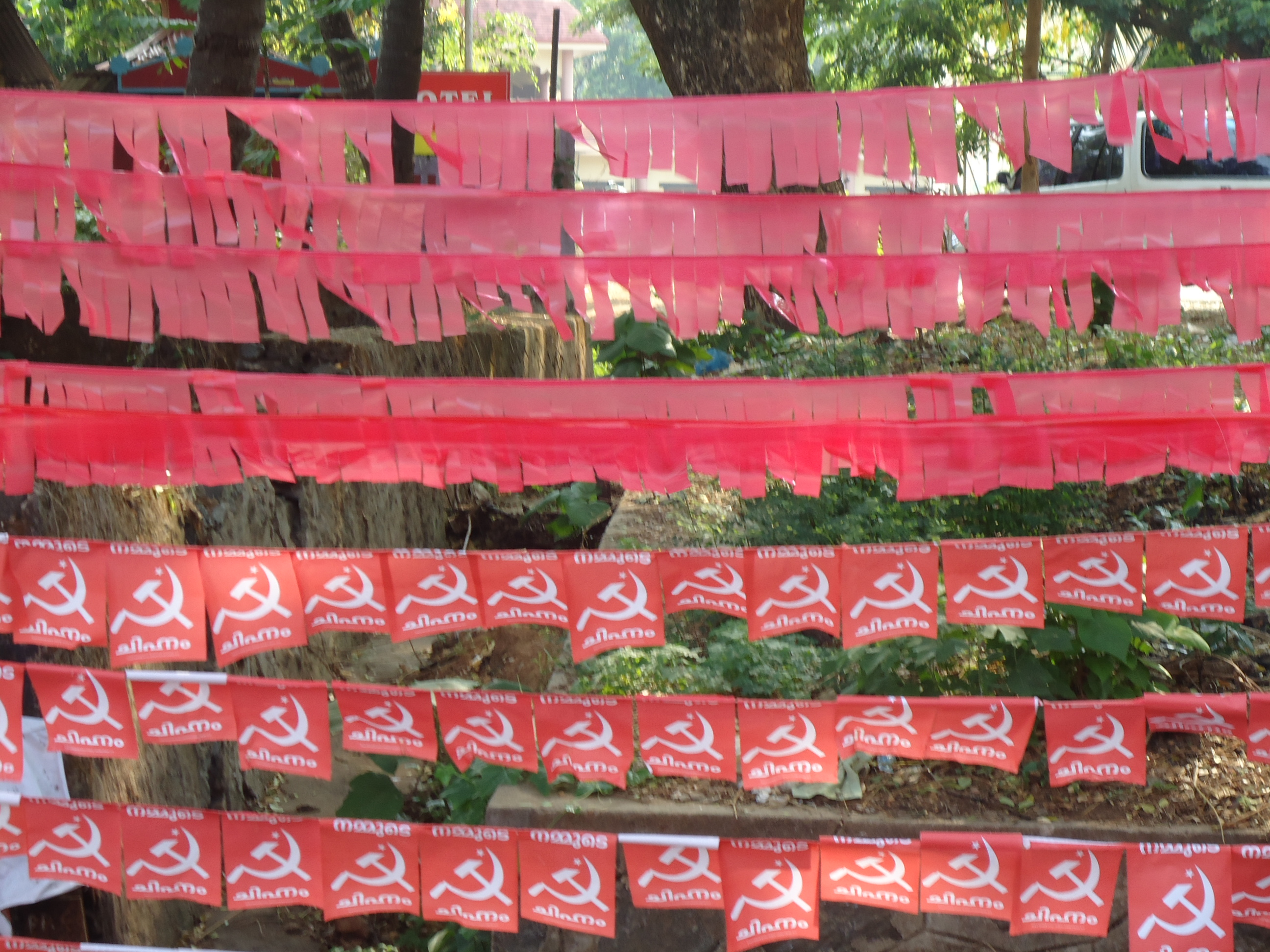
Election campaign in Kerala

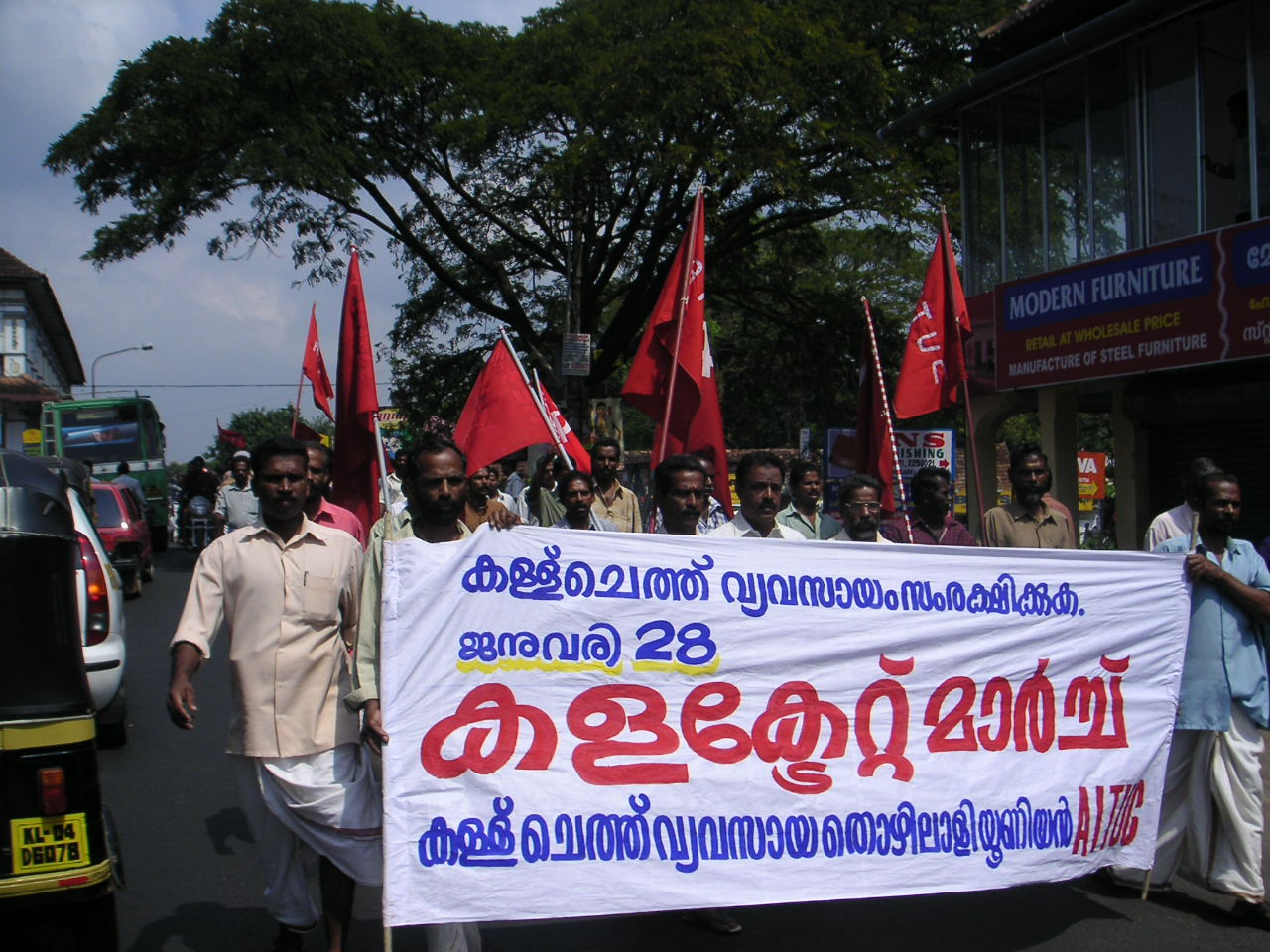
A rally by toddy worker's trade union

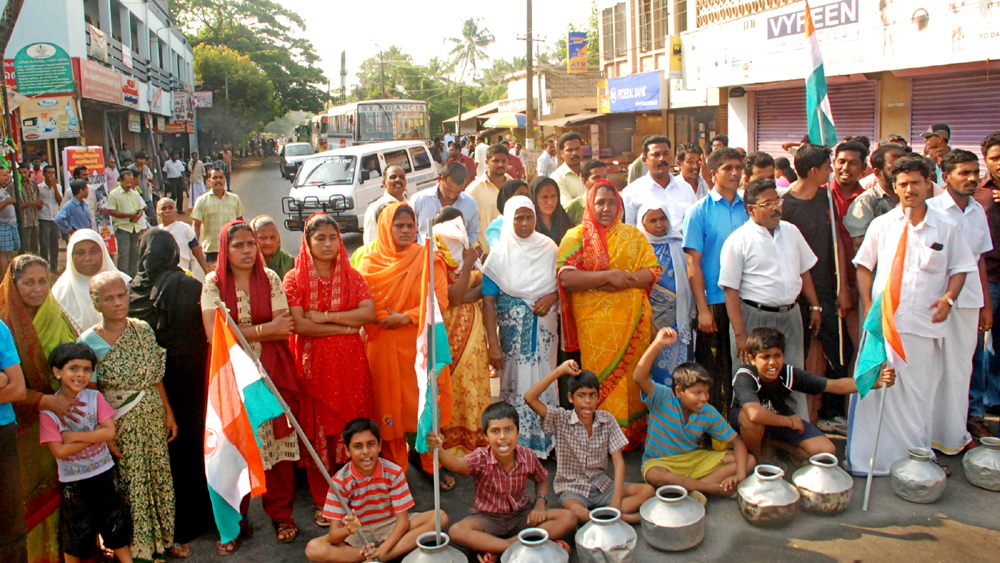
Vypin Strike

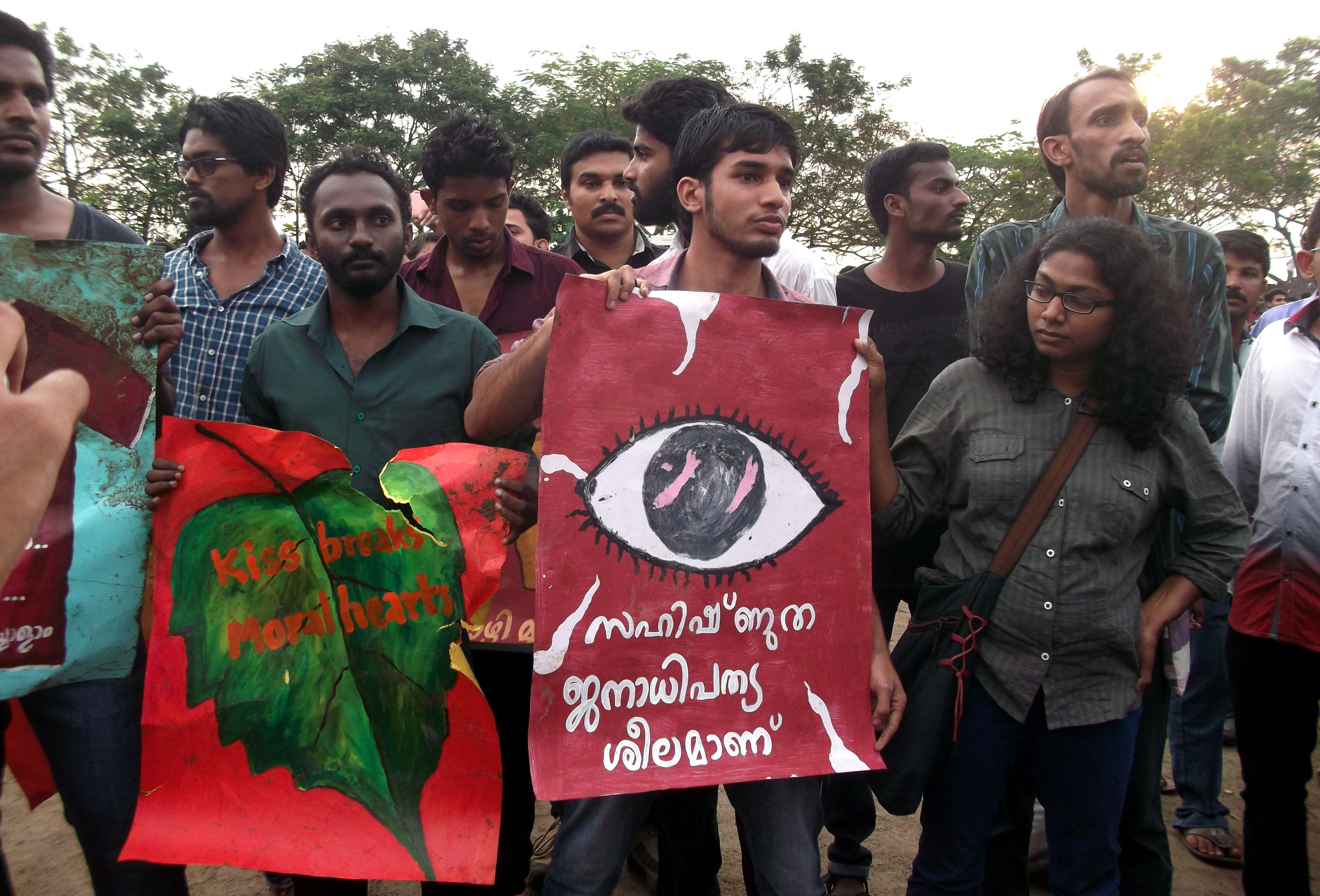
Kiss of Love protest 2014

Kerala is a politically-active society in India, with a politically active and aware population. Many of the news events happening in Kerala are related to the political events happening in the state.

== Hartals ==
A record total of 223 hartals were observed in 2006. There were around 363 "Hartals", called by different political parties, between 2005 and 2012. Hartals are called for various political, economic and social reasons.

== Political violence ==
Between 2000 and 2017, Kerala reported at least 80 political murders. The state also reported the third-highest number of murders committed (12) due to political reasons in 2015, according to the National Crime Records Bureau (NCRB) data. In the last 17 years, 85 CPM workers, 65 RSS or BJP workers, 11 workers of Congress and IUML each have been killed - mostly by their political rivals.

Between 2000 and 2016, Kannur district in Kerala reported 69 political murders, with RSS losing almost as many workers as CPM, according to The Hindustan Times. Kannur is considered to be a bastion of Kerala’s communist movement since the 1930s. The district is the homeland of communist veterans like former Member of Parliament A. K. Gopalan, former Chief Minister of Kerala E. K. Nayanar and Azhikodan Raghavan. Kannur is said to be the state’s most violent territory – more so with the advent of the RSS in the 1960s. Clashes between the RSS and the CPI(M) have claimed over 300 lives since 1969.

== Political murders after 2010 ==
Sl. No.	Date	Name	Organisations	Location
1	15.11.2021	Sanjith	RSS	Palakkad
2	18.12.2021	KS Shan	SDPI	Alappuzha
3	19.12.2021	Ranjith Srinivas	RSS	Alappuzha
4	15.04.2022	Subair	SDPI	Palakkad
5	16.04.2022	Sreenivasan	RSS	Palakkad
6	14.08.2022	Shajahan	CPIM	Palakkad

== Kiss of Love protest ==
Kiss of Love protest was a non-violent protest against moral policing, which started in Kerala, India, and later spread to other parts of India. The movement began when a Facebook page called 'Kiss of love' called forth the youth across Kerala to participate in a protest against moral policing on 2 November 2014, at Marine Drive, Cochin. The movement received widespread support with more than 154,404 'Likes' for the Facebook page. After the initial protest in Kochi, similar protests were organised in other major cities of the country. It received opposition from various religious and political groups like Bharatiya Janata Yuva Morcha, SDPI, Vishva Hindu Parishad, Shiv Sena, Bajrang Dal, Hindu Sena and Ernakulam wing of Kerala Students Union. On specific occasions but not exclusively, both the Supreme Court of India and Delhi High Court have made it clear that kissing in public is not an obscene act and no criminal proceedings can be initiated, for kissing in public, through landmark judgments.

== Legal remedies ==
In 2015, the provincial government in Kerala introduced a law that tried to control hartals and bandhs. According to this new bill, a notification of three days is required for any public agitation. The draft gives the government powers to cancel a strike announced by any party. A punishment of six months' imprisonment is included in the draft bill.

== Leftist inclination ==
The social thought and behaviour of the State in general has a strong inclination towards leftism and thus the communist parties have made strong inroads in Kerala. Kerala was the first Indian state where the communists were voted to power. The Malabar region, particularly Kannur and Palakkad are considered to heartland of communist parties. The Kollam and Alapuzha districts, where trade unions have very strong presence, are generally inclined towards the left parties; though the Congress-led UDF have won elections from the constituencies of these districts several times. The largest communist party in terms of membership is CPI(M) followed by CPI.

== History ==
SL No	Date	Called By	Reason	Ref
1	18-01-2012	Mullaperiyar Samrakshna Samiti	Mullaperiyar Dam Row	
2	28-02-2012	Trade unions in India	Protest against the 'neo-liberal economic & labour policies' pursued by the Central Government	
3	05-05-2012	UDF	Protest Against Murder of T. P. Chandrasekharan	
4	24-05-2012	LDF & BJP	Petrol Price Hike	
5	02-08-2012	CPI(M)	Protest Against the arrest of CPM Kannur district secretary P Jayarajan	
6	15-09-2012	LDF & BJP	Petrol Price Hike	

== Hartals in 2018 ==
SL No	Date	Called By	Reason	Ref
1	22-Jan-2018	CITU, AITUC, INTUC, Trade Unions	[Privatisation of PSUs, Labour Laws]	"News Report on 2018-01-22 from Business Line". 2 September 2015.
1	02-Apr-2018	CITU, AITUC, INTUC, STU, HMS, UTUC, Trade Unions	[Fixed Term Employment Rules]	"News Report on 2018-03-31 from Manorama News".
1	9-Apr-2018	Dalit Organisations	[Police action against Dalits in north India]	"News Report on 2018-04-09 from News 18". 9 April 2018.
2	29-May-2018	UDF, BJP, BDJS, KC(M)	[Kevin Joseph Murder]	"News Report on 2018-05-29 from Hindu News". The Hindu. 29 May 2018.
2	07-Aug-2018	CITU, AITUC, INTUC	[Motor Vehicles Amendment Bill 2017]	"News Report on 2018-05-29 from Manorama".
2	10-Sep-2018	LDF, UDF	[Fuel Price Hike]	"News Report on 2018-05-29 from UNI".
2	16-Oct-2018	UDF	[Anti-people policies by the state and Centre]	"News Report on 2018-05-29 from HT". 16 October 2017.
3	14-Dec-2018	BJP	[Sabarimala Issue]	"News Report on 14-12-2018 from TOI". The Times of India. 14 December 2018.

== See also ==
- Hartal
- Bandh
- Gherao
- Satyagraha
