= Bandh =

South Asian form of a general strike

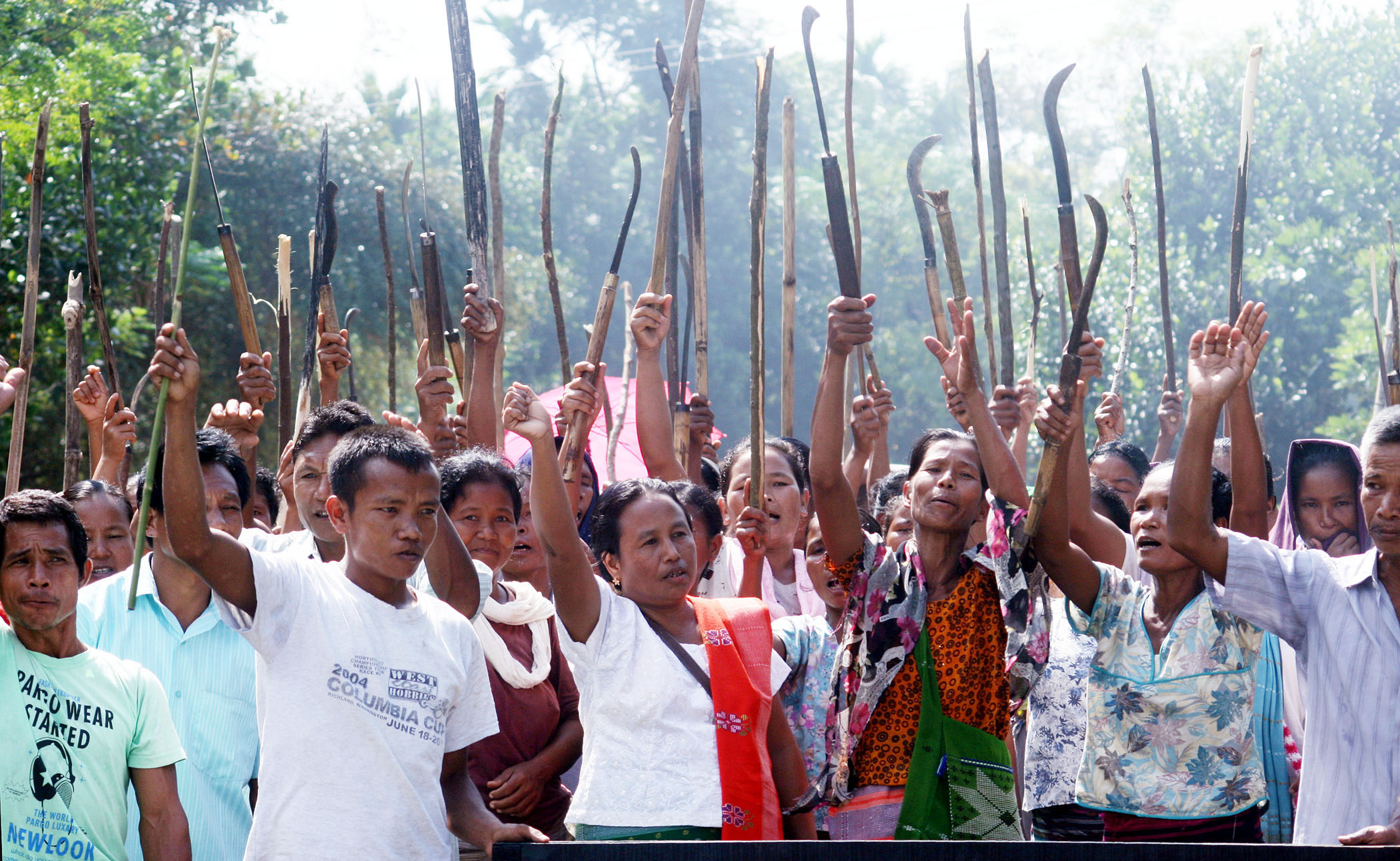
A bandh organized by the Garo National Council in Goalpara, 2013

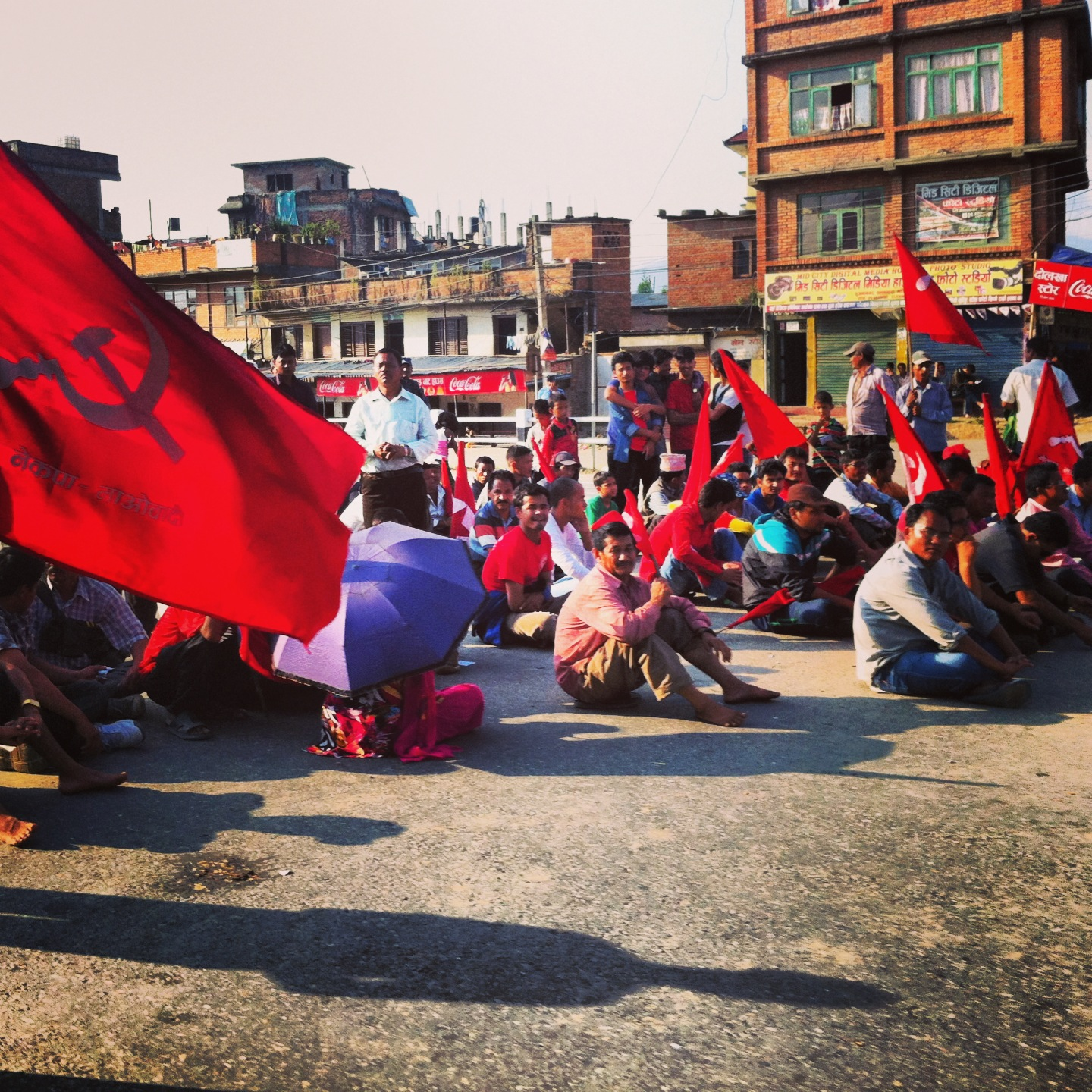
A bandh in Nepal, organized protest against a rise in fuel prices

Bandh (Hindi: बंध, बंद, romanized: bandh, band, lit. 'closing; shutting down') is a form of protest marked by disruption of public life used by political activists in South Asian countries such as India and Nepal. During a bandh, a political party or a community declare a general strike. For example, a Bharat bandh is a call for a bandh across India, and a bandh can also be called for an individual state or municipality.

The community or political party declaring a bandh expects the general public to stay at home and not report for work. Shopkeepers are expected to keep their shops closed, public services cease, and transport operators are expected to stay off the road. There have been instances when large cities have been brought to a standstill. Participation may also be enforced by adherents onto others in the form of demonstrations and patrols, the latter often willing to commit violence. Their use extends to militant groups, social movement organizations, and political parties across ideologies.

The distinction between a bandh and hartal is debated. Often used interchangeably, scholars like Roman Krtsch, Subrata K. Mitra, Jivanti Schöttli, and Siegfried Wolf embrace synonymity. Others argue the difference lies in coercion unique to bandhs, whilst Ritty Lukose posits bandhs are more coordinated and long-lasting.

== History ==
=== Origins and spread ===
Organized labour in India began with the foundation of the Bombay Mill-Hands Association in 1892 and expanded with the formation of the Madras Labour Union and All India Trade Union Congress (AITUC) in 1918 and 1920, respectively. During the 1920s and 1930s Indian independence movement, railway and textile workers specifically executed solidarity strikes with the non-cooperation and civil disobedience movements. As such, it alongside hartal, jatha, and satyagraha adopted nationalist connotations. Strikes were legally recognized by the British Raj in the Trade Unions Act of 1926. On occasion, the Indian National Congress (INC) could call for a general strike, as was done in 1937 Calcutta. In the midst of World War II and a day before he announced the INC's Quit India Movement, Mahatma Gandhi in an interview stated that he contemplated a general strike but would only utilize it if necessary. Following Indian independence in 1947, the Industrial Disputes Act inaugurated social dialogue tribunals in effect during the 1950s and 1960s.

In 1966, general strikes regained popularity. Despite the total opposition winning half of the seats in the 1966 Rajya Sabha elections, they constituted only a fourth of seats in Parliament and controlled no state governments. Bandhs were then increasingly leveraged by the Indian left and unions, some of which developed strong party affiliations. This caused conflict within the labour movement. For example, a 25 August Bombay bandh was supported by the communist AITUC and Samyukta Socialist Party-affiliated Hind Mazdoor Panchayat but opposed by the Hind Mazdoor Sabha, Indian National Trade Union Congress (INTUC), and independent engineering unions. They were weary of actions advancing party interests and prevented various industries from participating. Nevertheless, the 31 August–1 September bandh drew over 10,000 demonstrators, successfully enacting two rail roko and closing shops. Public employees of the central and state governments also turned to bandhs, as occurred in Madras State. By 1967, white-collar workers also engaged in kalam bandh ("stopping the pen"), a slowdown not coupled with a demonstration. One million public workers participated in the nationwide 1968 general strike, yet were repressed by the government via firings for violating the Essential Services Maintenance Act.

Following the 1969 state elections, the United Front, a 12-party, communist-majority coalition ruled West Bengal. However the ministry faced inter-party divisions, with bandhs being a common pressure tactic. Chief Minister Ajoy Mukherjee of the Bangla Congress resigned in March 1970 over a Communist Party of India (Marxist) (CPI(M)) bandh. Subsequently, the CPI(M) and Communist Party of India (CPI) separately initiated bandhs in Calcutta, the former to hasten the 1971 state elections. According to police, Naxalites seized the event as an opportunity to ignite bombs. By December, Calcutta became internationally known for disrupted public life. West Bengal ended the late 20th-century with the highest concentration of bandhs.

By the same year, the Marathi regionalist party Shiv Sena (SS) led by Bal Thackeray also utilized the bandh. Those called by the SS were strictly enforced by patrols and he contemplated establishing parallel police in Bombay. First discussed and decided in the karya kerani (executive committee), news of the decision was passed down the SS hierarchy and then spread by word of mouth to the public and general members by shakhas. Sociologist Dipankar Gupta argued neutrality during mobilization was "nearly impossible" as the gata pramukhs were responsible for familiarizing themselves with localities, especially strongholds like Dadar. Despite strict enforcement, Thackeray opposed indiscriminate destruction of property. By 1974, turmoil in Bombay drew comparison to Calcutta, with apparent issues of labour unrest, poverty, and caste discrimination. The preeminent street organizations were the SS and Dalit Panthers.

The George Fernandes-led 1974 All-India railway strike, in which 1.7 million workers participated, further shaped the labour movement and the state's reaction to it. AITUC and opposition parties called for a Bharat Bandh in solidarity for 15 May. However, it was confined to commercial and industry, sparing the public sector. The INC-affiliated INTUC opposed the bandh. Railway strikers were jailed and it served as catalyst for the The Emergency. An anonymous writer for the Economic and Political Weekly asserted it was the closest the labour movement and parties were to class struggle, but that unwillingness to extend the bandh to the public sector stifled the event.

During the 1980s, bandhs were called during insurgencies, including the ones in the northeast and Punjab. Union power declined during the decade and by the 1990s economic liberalisation policies were nationally implemented. India faced globalisation, privatisation, and the expansion of the informal sector. Accordingly, unions utilized bandhs to protest what they termed anti-labour and anti-poor policies.

=== Nepalese adoption ===
The Nepalese bandh emerged out of the national democracy movement. On March 27, 1980, opposition political parties and students called for a nationwide bandh, the first as C. P. Mainali recalls, against the Panchayat System. It prompted a national referendum on 2 May. Subsequent bandhs within the decade were similarly motivated. Mass use began following the 1990 revolution, initially by the nine left parties. Primarily organized by students and the Communist Party of Nepal (Maoist Centre), enforcement was violent during the November 2001 to December 2005 stage of the Nepalese Civil War. Student-orchestrated bandhs, often extensions from anti-government protest campaigns over increasing oil prices in 2003–2004, were characterized by relatively higher amounts of vandalism and typically failed to garner support beyond initial sympathizers. The 95 Maoist bandhs during the 2001–2005 period were more localized and dependent on the dynamics of the civil war. Due to the implied threat of violence, they were more effective and were a demonstration of control over unoccupied populations.

After the eruption of the Madhesh movement in January 2007, monthly bandhs increased rapidly. Their use became multilateral and especially prominent amongst marginalized ethnic organizations and actors wishing to impact the new constitution. Nepal Federation of Indigenous Nationalities leader Prakash Tandukar was quoted in May 2012 stating, "...the whole state structure is so pathetic, without enforcing a bandh, no one will listen. We have to make a show of force." In 2008, bandhs occurred on 254 days out of the year. In 2009, it was 298 days. According to Binod Chaudhary, each day cost $7–14 million in national revenue. Usage declined after May 2009 in part due to ineffectiveness from over saturation and repression of opposing demonstrations by a renewed 2009–2010 Maoist movement. In 2011, 88 days saw bandhs whereas it was 125 in 2012.

In 2011, journalist Deepak Adhiraki compared the bandh to Occupy Oakland, clarifying the U.S. Occupy movement was peaceful. Journalist Matthew O'Brien noted they differed in that decision-making in Oakland was through consensus-building whereas bandhs then were directed by politicians. For the remainder of the 2010s, the communist left continued to call for bandhs, including nationwide ones, to lesser success.

=== Suppression and contemporary bandhs ===
Political activism in Kerala became the legal battleground for the 1990s "anti-bandh culture" movement. Its adherents argued they "victimized the public" and infringed the right to consume public spaces. The organization Kochi City Vigilance argued pre-independence bandhs reflected the will of the people but that post-independence bandhs were co-opted by parties under the guise of "democratic dissent". In 1997, the High Court of Kerala banned bandhs, upheld by the Supreme Court of India the same year. However, political parties still organize them, briefly substituting the word bandh with hartal until that too was banned in 2003. The ruling United Democratic Front was criticized for ineffective enforcement, but the Indian left was center to criticism of the practice itself. Left Democratic Front leader E. M. S. Namboodiripad retorted they fell under the right to protest and that banning them was fascist. In 2004, the Supreme Court of India fined two political parties, Bharatiya Janata Party (BJP) and SS, for organizing a bandh in Mumbai as a protest against bomb blasts in the city. The Supreme Court permits only voluntary closure of establishments during bandhs.

Following victory in the 2006 elections, CPI(M) Chief Minister of West Bengal Buddhadeb Bhattacharjee opposed labour militancy and successfully defied a national call from the party for a bandh against the United Progressive Alliance in June. Rather, his administration appealed to investors and demanded labour "deliver", not "clamor" for more. He was censured by the state CPI(M) for this rhetoric. Journalist Vir Sanghvi praised Bhattacharjee's position, reflecting on his own experience with Shiv Sena's bandhs in Calcutta and others by CPI(M) elsewhere. He asserted the change promoted progress and hard work. His successor, Mamata Banerjee, similarly condemned bandhs, including her own past calls, and cracked down on public worker participation. Viewing them as incompatible with development, she claimed to have ended their political era in February 2023.

Despite repression, bandhs are still commonplace in Indian politics. The Communist Party of India (Maoist), a rebel group in the Naxalite–Maoist insurgency, since 2003 has also used them to demonstrate power over unoccupied populations. The 2002 Gujarat violence also occurred during a bandh called by Vishva Hindu Parishad and endorsed by BJP. Chief Minister Narendra Modi's government took no preventative measures and anti-Muslim violence was perpetuated from 28 February to 2 March, including the burning of homes and shops, looting, destroying of 76 shrines, and killing of Ehsan Jafri and 1,000 Muslims. Since then, Hindu nationalists have won state governmental elections. Sociologist Moyukh Chatterjee utilized the event as a case study in the bandh as performative crowd politics that forms publics in the pursuit of cultural hegemony. A mixture of mass protest and mass murder, the bandh, he posits, is frequently used by parties to assert popular sovereignty and to challenge state authority.

Union-called bandhs since the 2010s have spiked. In September 2010 and February 2012, multi-union nationwide bandhs involved over 100 million workers. In September 2016, unions claimed 180 million participants. The 2020 Bharat bandh and 2025 Indian general strike set the record for 250 million workers.

== Notable bandhs ==
Bandhs are often by opposition parties. The National Democratic Alliance (NDA) and 13 parties not belonging to the United Progressive Alliance parties called for a nationwide bandh on 5 July 2010, to protest a fuel price hike. The bandh prevented Indians from carrying out day-to-day tasks, especially in states that were ruled by the NDA and the Left. In Nepal, calls for bandhs have increased due to political instability.

On 20 September 2012, the BJP and other parties called for a nationwide bandh in response to economic reforms undertaken by Prime Minister Manmohan Singh and his finance minister Palaniappan Chidambaram. Chief among their grievances were the cut in subsidies for diesel and cooking gas and the decision to allow foreign investors to own majority stakes in the retail sector, including supermarkets and department stores.

On 3 January 2018, Prakash Ambedkar called for a bandh in response to an attack on Buddhists, as well as some Hindu dalit and Sikh people by supporters of the Hindutva ideology at Koregaon Bhima in Pune district, Maharashtra, and the lack of police action against the culprits. More than 50 percent of Maharashtra's population supported or participated in the bandh.

In August 2024 a bharat bandh was called by twenty one organisations in protest at the Indian Supreme Court ruling of 1 August 2024 allowing states to sub-classify scheduled castes and scheduled tribes for preferential employment quotas.

== See also ==
- Communist involvement in the Indian independence movement
- Dharna
- Gherao
- Kamaiya and kamlari
- Raasta roko
