= Malaysian Heritage and History Club =

Facebook group dedicated to the preservation of Malaysian history

- Company type: Online Knowledge Sharing
- Founded: October 13, 2012; 13 years ago
- Website: Malaysian Heritage and History Club Facebook group

Malaysian Heritage and History Club is a Facebook group with over fifty-thousand members for discussion of Malaysian history and culture.

== Background ==
The Malaysian Heritage and History Club's Facebook group was created in October 2012 by Bert Tan. In September 2015, the Club hosted a "People's Merdeka" heritage festival which included talks on the history of Kelantan state and the Peranakan community.

The club was acknowledged in Rosalie and Other Love Songs, which noted that the club has "irreverent but erudite members."

On May 13, 2016, the club was used to commemorate the anniversary of the Sino-Malay violence during the 13 May Incident of 1969.
