= 1810 House Tax Hartal =

Comprehensive general strike near Varansi, India

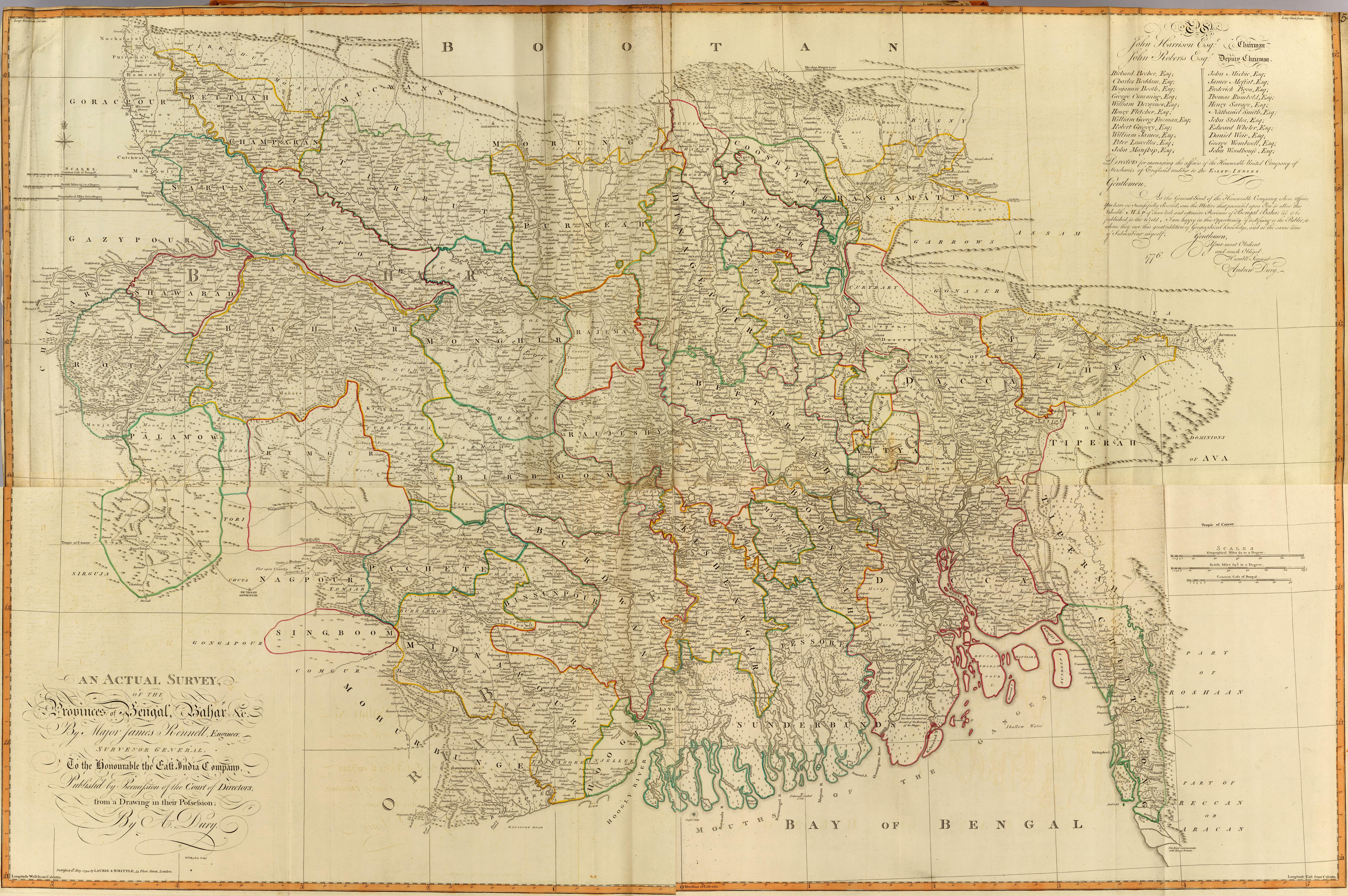
1794 map of the Bengal Presidency, where the hartal took place in

The 1810 House Tax Hartal was a hartal (a form of general strike) which took place in the East India Company's Bengal Presidency from 1810 to 1811. It consisted of a nonviolent general strike to protest a house tax Company authorities were attempting to introduce. In 1811 the Company repealed the tax but reintroduced it in three cities in 1812 but the assessment and spending of the tax was placed in the hands of Indian representatives, which resulted in no further protests.

== Background ==
In 1810 colonial authorities in the East India Company's Bengal Presidency attempted to extend a house tax that was in effect in Calcutta to four other regions of the presidency: Varanasi, Bengal, Bihar and Odisha. Rising inflation, crop failures and widespread poverty made the tax especially difficult to bear. Various non-governmental organisations in Varanasi met to decide on a course of opposition to the tax, and eventually decided on a hartal which included a general strike.

== Hartal ==
The strike was extraordinarily comprehensive. According to one commentator:

Everything was at a stand: the dead bodies were cast unceremoniously into the river, because there were none to perform the obsequial rites; and the very thieves refrained from the exercise of their vocation, although the shops and houses were left without protection...

The protesters gathered in a mass protest near buildings of the colonial authorities outside of Varanasi, and were joined by people from neighboring towns, in numbers variously estimated at more than 200,000 or between 20,000 and 30,000 people. They presented a petition to the city magistrate asking for the repeal of the tax. Meanwhile, they remained peaceably assembled throughout the days, returning to their homes at night, from 26 December 1810 to 8 January 1811. They explained this tactic in their petition thus:

The manner and custom in this country, from time immemorial, is this: that, whenever any act affecting everyone generally, is committed by the Government, the poor, the aged, the infirm, the women, all forsake their families and their homes, expose themselves to the inclemency of the seasons and to other kinds of inconveniencies, and make known their affliction and distress, that the Government, which is more considerate than our parents, may observe their condition and extend indulgence to its subjects.

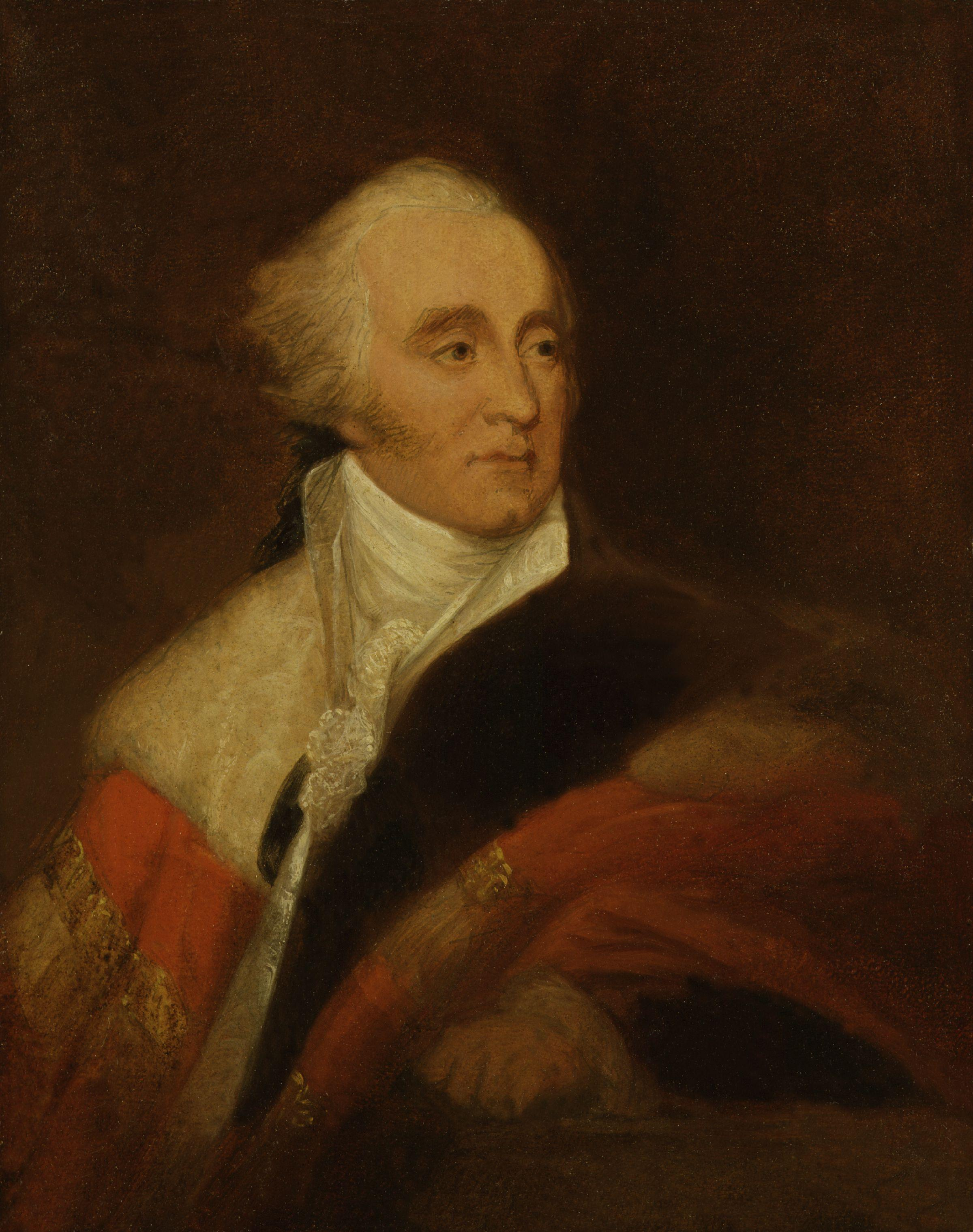
Lord Minto, to whom the protestors unsuccessfully attempted to present their demands

The tax collector commented on the nonviolent resistance strategy in this way:

At present open violence does not seem their aim, they seem rather to vaunt their security in being unarmed in that a military force would not use deadly weapons against such inoffensive foes. And in this confidence they collect and increase, knowing that the civil power cannot disperse them, and thinking that the military will not.

The protest began to die down, but was revitalized by intransigence on the part of the colonial authorities, which declared the protest assembly illegal on 13 January 1811. The protesters organized a march to Calcutta to present the Governor-General of the Presidency of Fort William Lord Minto with their demands, but this petered out and they instead presented their petition through more ordinary bureaucratic channels.

== Result ==
The protest was successful in convincing the colonial authorities to repeal the house tax. The following year, a more limited version of the tax was instituted in three cities, but the assessment and spending of the tax was placed in the hands of Indian representatives. That reformed tax did not provoke vigorous protests.

== See also ==
- Freitag, Sandria B. (1989). Culture and Power in Banaras. University of California Press. pp. 215–220. ISBN 9780585111117.
- Heitler, Richard (July 1972). "The Varanasi House Tax Hartal of 1810-11". The Indian Economic & Social History Review. 9 (3): 239–257. doi:10.1177/001946467200900301. S2CID 145385942.
