= Hartal Doktor Kontrak =

2021 workers' strike in Malaysia

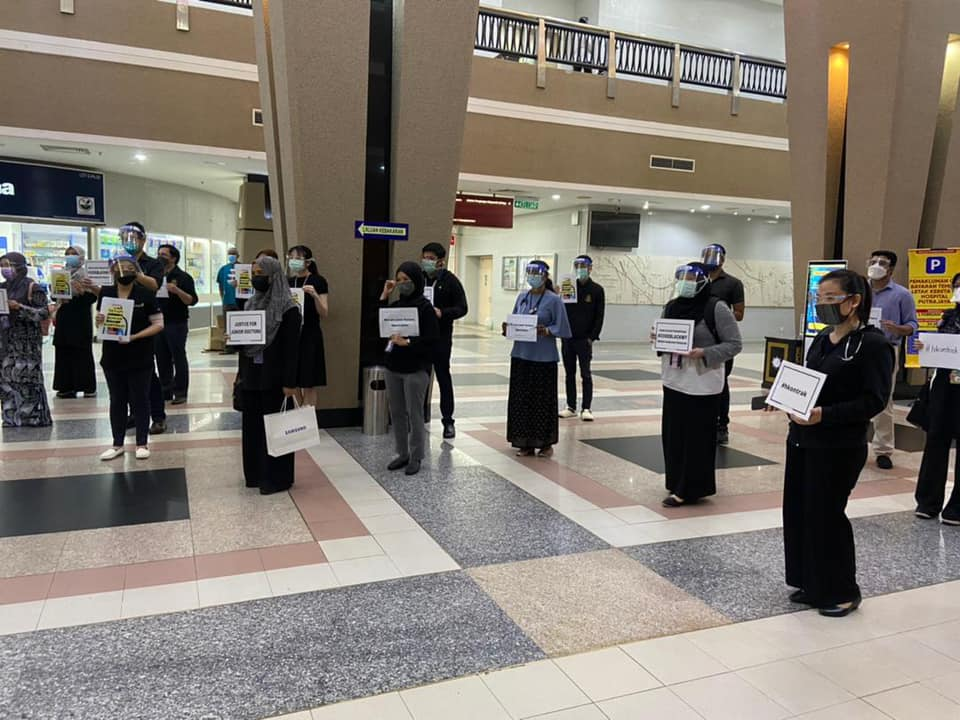
- A group of government doctors began their peaceful protests at hospitals across the country at 11 a.m. to push for systemic reforms that prevented them from furthering their studies as well did not provide job security.
- Date: 26 July 2021 (UTC+8)
- Location: Hospitals in Malaysia
- Caused by: Protest towards Malaysian contract medical officer appointment policy
- Goals: Automatic absorption of contract medical officers into the national health system; Transparency of the method of absorption of contract officers into permanent government officials; Job security and post-contract study continuation
- Methods: Strike action (hartal); Internet activism

Parties
Medical officers under contract	Malaysia Government of Malaysia: Ministry of Health; Public Service Department; Royal Malaysian Police

Number
Estimation of 4,000 officers	

Hartal Doktor Kontrak (HDK) was a nationwide workers' strike organised by medical officers in Malaysia on 26 July 2021 in protest against the government's contract system in appointing medical officers which was implemented at the end of 2016.

== Background ==
The Malaysian contract medical officer appointment policy is a policy enforced by the Malaysian government since December 2016 as a measure to appoint new medical officers into the country's healthcare system and career life in general. The plan was made following the surplus of medical graduates in Malaysia due to the excessive opening of institutions of higher learning, especially those of private.

However, this contract appointment system received objections from various parties for several reasons. The main problem raised regarding this policy is the fate of government medical officers after the expiration of a five-year contract as there is no clear policy for the absorption of medical officers into permanent positions. Based on a statement given by the Minister of Health, Dr Adham Baba in May 2021, only about 3% (789 people) of contract medical officers were successfully appointed as permanent medical officers out of about 32,000 medical officers involved. Apart from that, several other issues were also raised including lower salaries, problems with employee leave and opportunities to further their studies to become specialised medical specialists.

The main consequence of such an appointment system is the threat of a decline in the number of the country's medical officers. This policy's reaction is significantly seen with foreign medical students who are more determined to continue their studies in foreign countries than in Malaysia due to the uncertainties arising from this policy. The problem of a shortage of specialist doctors in Malaysia is also a threat addressed in this policy issue.

== Timeline ==
=== Prestrike ===
Five years after the implementation of the contract system, medical officers intimidated to carry out hartals (workers 'strikes) starting 26 July 2021, nationwide to demand the cessation of the policy and solution to the problem of absorption of medical officers into the country's healthcare system. This happened following a statement by the Minister of Health, Dr Adham Baba which is seen supporting the contract doctor policy as well as supporting the appointment of pro-Bumiputera which is discriminatory. Subsequently, the contract policy was reraised as a discussion in the Cabinet Meeting to find a solution to this problem. In addition, the government also introduced a special contract for one year which offers reappointment as a contract officer from 5 December 2021 to 4 December 2022. Within days before the strike, contract medical officers began resigning out of frustration and anger with their uncertain post-contract future. To reduce stress among medical officers, on 22 July 2021, the government reduced the mandatory employment period from 24 months to 18 months; this means that contract officers are given relaxation to retire after the 18th month.

Throughout July 2021, activism were conducted online in an effort to spread awareness to the public on the issue of contract doctors. These include the introduction of the #HartalDoktorKontrak hashtag on social media, the waving of a black flag and the wearing of all black as a sign of solidarity. On 12 July 2021, a side campaign called Black Monday was organised as a sign of solidarity.

=== Strike day ===
The peak of the strike occurred on 26 July 2021 with actual strikes carried out by contract doctors across the country, with government hospitals being the focus. About more than 20 government hospitals were involved in the strike. Generally, the strike was carried out simultaneously at 11 in the morning, the usual break time for employees and protests stopped after that time to return to duty. The method of the strike was that the contract officers left the hospital as a sign of protest. Meanwhile, several government hospitals were not involved in the strike.

=== Poststrike ===
A few days after the strike, a representative of the hartal movement said that his movement would not hesitate to organise a similar strike again if their regards and demands were not given priority in next year's national budget.

== Action ==
Generally, this protest was controlled by the Royal Malaysia Police (RMP). On the day of the strike, the police began investigating the organisers in the context of violating the rules in the country's Movement control order which banned any assembly event. In addition, there were allegations from contract doctors that warnings were given by hospital directors with further action to be taken against those who joined the strike. Through the Special Meeting of the Fourteenth Term Parliament on 27 July 2021, the Minister of Health, Dr Adham Baba assured that no action would be taken against the contract doctor who joined the hartal the day before. The decision was supported by several MPs including former Health Minister, Dr Dzulkefly Ahmad.

== See also ==
- Social impact of the COVID-19 pandemic in Malaysia
- Healthcare in Malaysia
- List of hospitals in Malaysia
