= Khondker Modarresh Elahi =

Bangladeshi former assistant attorney general

Advocate Khondker Modarresh Elahi (Tiru)
- খন্দকার মোদাররেস এলাহী (তিরু)
- Citizenship: Bangladesh
- Occupations: Lawyer, advocate, and assistant attorney general
- Known for: Lawsuits
- Notable work: Elahi vs. Government of Bangladesh (2001)

Khondker Modarresh Elahi (Tiru) is a supreme court advocate, lawyer, and assistant attorney general of Bangladesh. He is famous for his notable lawsuits.

== Personal life ==
Elahi is the son of Khondkar Reza Elahi, who is a step-brother of K. Maudood Elahi. His present address is in Flat 4/C, House no. 15, Road no. 02, Block-B, Pallabi, Mirpur-12, Dhaka.

== Career ==
Elahi is a lawyer and a supreme-court advocate. He was a member of the Dhaka Bar Association from 11 December 2004. He became assistant attorney general in 2009. Elahi represented the state in an extortion case concerning the former minister Nazmul Huda. He was relieved of his duties as assistant attorney general on June 11, 2017, due to poor performance.

He served as the vice-principal and acting principal of the Mirpur Law College.

== Notable Lawsuits ==
=== Khondaker Modarresh Elahi vs. The Government of Bangladesh (2001) ===
In Khondaker Modarresh Elahi vs. The Government of the People's Republic of Bangladesh (2001), the High Court Division addressed a petition from Elahi seeking to declare hartals (political strikes) unconstitutional due to threatened fundamental rights and associated political violence. The court issued a suo moto rule to determine the legality of the practice.

The High Court Division ruled that calling a hartal is a protected form of expression under the Constitution of Bangladesh, but determined that any accompanying threat, enforcement coercion, or anti-hartal aggression constituted a criminal offense. The court noted that the utility of hartals was a political issue that should be decided by politicians rather than the judiciary.

The decision was appealed to the Appellate Division in Abdul Mannan Bhuiya and others v. The State and others, which issued its judgment in December 2007. The apex court upheld the ruling that peaceful hartals are a constitutionally guaranteed right. However, it reversed the High Court Division's declaration criminalizing hartal coercion, ruling on technical legal grounds that only Parliament has the authority to create criminal offenses. The Appellate Division clarified that violence, death, and property damage occurring during hartals were already cognizable offenses punishable under the existing Penal Code and penal laws.
