= Subrata K. Mitra =

Franco-Indian political scientist

Subrata Kumar Mitra (born 16 June 1949 in Orissa, India, naturalized French) was director and research professor at the Institute for South Asian Studies at the National University of Singapore till 20 May 2018. Currently emeritus at the University of Heidelberg.

== Education ==
Subrata Mitra received a bachelor's degree in political science from Utkal University in Orissa, India. Subsequently, he obtained an M.A. in political science in 1971 based on a thesis on "The Role of the Bharatiya Kranti Dal in the Politics of Uttar Pradesh, 1967–1970" from the University of Delhi. After receiving an M.Phil degree in Political Development from Jawaharlal Nehru University in New Delhi, Mitra moved to the United States to the University of Rochester in Rochester, New York. He studied with William Riker and Bruce Bueno de Mesquita and received his doctorate in political science in 1976 based on his dissertation on "Ideological Structure, Strategy and Cabinet Stability: a theoretical and empirical exploration" directed by G. Bingham Powell.

== Career ==
Subrata Mitra is professor emeritus of political science of South Asia at the Faculty of Economic and Social Sciences of the University of Heidelberg. He was previously Head of the Department of Political Science at the South Asia Institute (University of Heidelberg) and was elected the South Asia Institute's director for a term from 2002 to 2004. Professor Mitra previously taught at the University of Hull (England), University of Nottingham and University of California, Berkeley. He has also held appointments at the Indian Council for Social Science Research (New Delhi), as well as at the Institut Français d'Opinion Public (Paris). Professor Mitra is a visiting fellow at the Centre for the Study of Developing Societies (New Delhi) and from 2002 until 2006 he was the president of the joint Research Committee on Political Sociology of the International Political Science Association and the International Sociological Association. In 2004, Mitra was made Chevalier dans l'Ordre des Palmes Académiques for his commitment to promoting cultural exchange between France and Germany.

He is editor of the Heidelberg Papers in South Asian and Comparative Politics and a member of the editorial boards of the following publications: International Political Science Review, Journal of Commonwealth and Comparative Politics, India Review, International Journal of Hindu Studies, Contemporary South Asia, South Asia Research, Journal of South Asian Development. He is also the editor of the Advances in South Asian Studies series of Routledge.

== Research ==
Subrata Mitra's work deals with issues such as democratization in South Asia, the interaction of traditional values and modern institutions, the role of identity and religion in Indian politics, as well as the functioning of political parties and institutions in South Asia.

== Books/edited volumes (selection) ==
- Power, Protest and Participation: Local Elites and Development in India. Routledge, 1992.
- Democracy and Social Change in India: A Cross-sectional Analysis of the Indian Electorate (Co-author). Sage, 1999.
- Culture and Rationality: The Politics of Social Change in Post-colonial India. Sage, 1999.
- Political Parties in South Asia (Co-editor). Praeger, 2004.
- The Puzzle of India’s Governance: Culture, Context and Comparative Theory. Routledge, 2006.
- A Political and Economic Dictionary of South Asia (Co-author). Taylor & Francis/Europa Publications, 2006.
- Politics of Modern South Asia (editor). Five volumes. Routledge, 2008.
- When Rebels Become Stakeholders: Democracy, Agency and Social Change in India (Co-author). Sage, 2009.
- Political Sociology - The State of the Art (Co-editor). Budrich Publishers, 2010.
- Politics in India: Structure, Process and Policy. Routledge, 2011.

== Select articles ==
- How Exceptional is India’s Democracy? Path Dependence, Political Capital, and Context in South Asia, India Review, 12(4), Oct-Dec 2013, pp. 227–244.
- The Ambivalent Moderation of Hindu Nationalism in India, Australian Journal of Political Science, (2013) vol. 48, No. 3, pp. 269–285.
- Icon-ising National Identity: France and India in Comparative Perspective, National Identities, 15(4) December 2013, pp. 357–377.
- Symbiosis, Re-use and Evolution: Administrators, Politicians, Citizens and Governance in Post-colonial India, Commonwealth and Comparative Politics, (November 2010) 48:4, pp. 457–478.
- Adversarial Politics and Policy Continuity: The UPA, NDA and Resilience of Democracy in India, Contemporary South Asia, 19 (2)(2011), pp. 173–187.
- Citizenship in India: Some Preliminary Results of a National Survey, Economic and Political Weekly, 27 February 2010.
- Nuclear, Engaged, and Non-Aligned: Contradiction and Coherence in India's Foreign Policy, India Quarterly: A Journal of International Affairs, Vol. 65, No. 1, pp. 15–35 (2009).
- When Area Meets Theory: Dominance, Dissent and Democracy in India, International Political Science Review (2008), vol 29(5), pp. 557–578.
- Level playing fields: The Post-colonial State, Democracy, Courts and Citizenship in India, German Law Journal, 9:3, 2008, pp. 343–366.
- The new Dynamics of Indian Foreign Policy and its Ambiguities] (Co-author), Irish Studies in International Affairs, Volume 18, 2007, pp. 19–34.
- The role of research in a technical assistance agency: the case of the ‘German Agency for Technical Cooperation’ (Co-author), Health Policy, 70 (2004), pp. 229–241.
- The reluctant hegemon: India’s self perception and the South Asian strategic environment. Contemporary South Asia, 12:3 (September 2003), pp. 399–418.
- Sacred Laws and the Secular State: An Analytical Narrative of the Controversy over Personal Laws in India (Co-author), India Review, 2002, 1:3, 99-130.
- War and Peace in South Asia: a revisionist view of India-Pakistan relations. Contemporary South Asia (2001), 10:3, pp. 361–379.
- Language and Federalism: The Multi-ethnic Challenge. International Social Science Journal, No. 167, March 2001, pp. 51–60.
- The discourse vanishes: revolution and resilience in Indian politics. Contemporary South Asia, 9:3 (November 2000), pp. 355–366.
- Parties and the People: India 's party system and the resilience of democracy. (Co-author), Democratization VI (1), Spring 1999, pp. 123–154.
- Effects of Institutional Arrangements on Political Stability in South Asia. Annual Review of Political Science (1999: 2), pp. 405–428.
- Nehru's Policy towards Kashmir: Bringing politics back in again. Commonwealth and Comparative Politics, Vol. 35 (2), 1996, pp. 55–74.
- The rational politics of cultural nationalism: subnational movements of South Asia in comparative perspective. British Journal of Political Science, 25:1 (January 1995), pp. 57–78.
- The National Front in France: The Emergence of an Extreme Right Protest Movement. (Co-author), Comparative Politics, Vol. 25, No. 1 (October 1992), pp. 63–82.
- Desecularising the state: religion and politics in India after independence. Comparative Studies in Society and History, 33:4 (October 1991), pp. 755–777.
- Crisis and resilience in Indian democracy. International Social Science Journal, 129 (August 1991), pp. 555–570.
- Room to maneuver in the middle: local elites, political action and the state in India. World Politics, 43:3 (April 1991), pp. 490–413.
- The limits of accommodation: Nehru, religion and the state in India. South Asia Research, 9:2 (November 1989), pp. 107–127.
- The paradox of power - political science as morality play. Commonwealth and Comparative Politics, 1988 (November), Vol. 26 (3), pp. 318–337.
- The National Front in France: A Single-Issue Movement?. West European Politics, 11: 2 (1988), pp. 47–64.
- India: dynastic rule or the democratisation of power?. Third World Quarterly, 10:1 (January 1988), pp. 129–159.
- A theory of governmental instability in parliamentary systems. Comparative Political Studies, 13:2 (July 1980), pp. 235–263.
- Ballot box and local power: electoral politics in an Indian village. Commonwealth & Comparative Politics, 17:3 (November 1979), pp. 283–299.
- Social Class and Belief System in the Indian Political Elite: An Exploratory Study of the Interactions of Attitudes, Ideology and Party Identification (co-author), Indian Journal of Political Science, 40(1), March 1979.
