= Bossnapping =

Detaining company executives as part of collective action

Bossnapping is a form of labor protest in France in which employees detain managers or executives, often in a labor dispute. The practice gained international attention after a series of bossnapping incidents in 2009 and 2010, when workers held executives of companies including Caterpillar, Sony, and 3M, as hostages to demand better severance packages.

These incidents resulted in a public call for an end to the practice by French President Nicolas Sarkozy, despite public opinion polling which showed widespread sympathy for the protesters.

== Description ==
The term "bossnapping" began receiving widespread use in the media following a series of high-profile incidents in France in the spring of 2009 where managers were detained by their workers. In early March 2009, workers in southwestern France held the CEO and HRD of Sony France overnight, demanding a better severance package for workers who had been laid off.

They barricaded the entrance to the facility with tree trunks, and held their hostages until the CEO agreed to a renegotiation of the severance package that laid-off workers were to receive. Later that month, workers at a 3M pharmaceutical factory in Pithiviers held their boss in his office demanding similar concessions for laid-off workers as well as protections for remaining workers whose jobs had not been cut. The workers claimed their actions were not intended to be aggressive, but were rather their "only currency." French police did not intervene in either the Sony or 3M incidents, in the correct expectation that each would be resolved peacefully.

Workers in the 3M incident provided a dinner of mussels and french fries to their kidnapped boss while he was being held.

In July 2009, workers of Azur Chimie (previously Arkéma) plant located in Port Le Bouc took headquarters and majority shareholders as hostages to weigh in the negotiations regarding the layoff of half of the workforce. A snapshot of these negotiations was videotaped.

In May 2010, workers of a Caterpillar Inc. plant in Grenoble took five managers as hostages to enforce negotiations about 733 job losses. They freed the managers after 10 hours when policemen began to record the bossnappers' names.

During the same month, about 300 workers of a Toyota factory in Onnaing (Northern France) blocked all entrances and hindered all trucks from leaving the premises.

Further bossnappings took place in a worksite of Hewlett-Packard in France and a lock-in of managers occurred at market research firm Synovate in Auckland, New Zealand as a part of a labor dispute during a contract renegotiation there. The wave of high-profile incidents led to publication of advice for managers who might be bossnapped, although news reports made clear that the hostages had been treated well by their bossnappers. This advice included the preparation of special bossnapping kits that included a change of clothes and a cell phone pre-programmed with numbers of family members, police, and a psychologist who might assist with the psychological stress caused by being the hostage in such an incident.

These incidents took place in the context of wider French labor unrest related to the recession of the late 2000s, in which many companies in France and across the globe laid off workers during restructuring the companies did in response to falling profits or rising losses. Other labor incidents in France during this period included one in which laid-off workers threw eggs at their manager and burned effigies of him and another in which workers at a car parts factory threatened to blow it up after the factory was closed completely.

In April 2009, in response to the ongoing series of bossnapping incidents, French President Nicolas Sarkozy pledged to end the practice, saying, "We are a nation of laws. I won't allow this sort of thing." However, public opinion polls in France at the time showed significant support for those using the strategy, a majority who disapproved of the tactic but sympathized with those practicing it, and only a small minority who completely opposed it. Thus, observers suggested that any strong action on the part of Sarkozy government to end bossnappings, included more proactive action by police to rescue hostages and arrest bossnappers, might lead to further unrest in other forms.

== See also ==
- Gherao
- Union violence
- Wildcat strike action
