= Public Order (Preservation) Act 1958 =

Malaysian law on civil disturbance

Federal Legislative Council of the Federation of Malaya
- Long title: An Act relating to the maintenance and restoration of public order.
- Citation: Act 296
- Territorial extent: Malaysia
- Passed by: Federal Legislative Council
- Passed: 23 October 1958
- Commenced: 5 December 1958 — Peninsular Malaysia; 16 September 1963 — Sabah and Sarawak, [L.N.232/1963]

Legislative history
- Introduced by: Abdul Razak Hussein - Minister of Defence
- First reading: 22 October 1958
- Second reading: 23 October 1958
- Third reading: 23 October 1958

Keywords
- Public order, protest, civil unrest, freedom of assembly, riot, curfew
- Status: In force

Public Order (Preservation) Act 1958 (Malay: Akta Ketenteraman Awam (Pemeliharaan) 1958) is a Malaysian law that governs the maintenance and restoration of public order in the event of civil disturbance or riot.

The Act allows the Minister of Home Affairs to declare any area in Malaysia as a "danger area". After an area has been declared as such, police would be granted with the powers to conduct search without warrant, road closure, ban assemblies, exclude persons from danger area, and impose curfew. The Home Minister is also empowered to recall licensed firearms and cut off telecommunication services in danger areas.

== Legal provisions ==
=== Proclamation of state of danger ===
Under Section 3(1) of the Act, if the Home Minister is in the opinion that the public order in any area in Malaysia is seriously disturbed or is seriously threatened, and the minister considers it necessary for the maintenance or restoration of public order in the area, he can proclaim that a "state of danger to public order" exist in that area.

The effective period of the proclamation would only lasted for one month, and may be extended by up to one month at a time by the minister. However, such proclamation or extension can be annulled by a resolution passed by both houses of the Parliament.

The Home Minister may also delegate his proclamation and extension powers to the Chief Minister or Menteri Besar of each state, but the Home Minister still retains the principle power to proclaim a danger area on his own.

=== Closure of roads and places ===
Once an area has been declared a danger area, the Chief Police Officer of a state or Officer in Charge of a Police District (OCPD) can order for the restriction, control and closure of roads, waterways and public places in the area under Section 4 of the Act. Senior police officers of or above the rank of sergeant may also give out the same orders under urgent circumstances, but must be confirmed by a Chief Police Officer or OCPD within 24 hours to have the orders remained valid.

To enforce these orders, police officers are empowered to erect barriers to prevent the passing of persons, either on foot or by vehicles, through the closed-off roads or public places. The police is also allowed to use necessary force to prevent intrusion, including the use of lethal weapons.

=== Prohibition of assemblies ===
Under Section 5, the OCPD may order the complete or conditional ban of any assembly, meeting or procession of five or more persons in the danger area. Additionally, any police officers of or above the rank of sergeant can order any ongoing assembly in the danger area to disperse immediately. The police may also, if it's necessary for public security, use necessary force to disperse an assembly, including the use of lethal weapons.

=== Curfew ===
In a proclaimed danger area, the Home Minister, Chief Police Officer, or the OCPD can impose curfew in any or all parts of the danger area and require every person to remain indoors within a specified hours, unless one has obtained a curfew permit from the minister or the police to remain outdoors during curfew period. Violation of the curfew order is punishable with up to 6 months imprisonment, or a RM500 fine, or both.

However, the Yang di-Pertuan Agong, Rulers, Yang di-Pertuan Negeri, and any police officers and military personnels on active duty are exempted from the curfew order. The Chief Police Officer or OCPD may also exempt a person or a group of persons from the curfew order.

=== Exclusion and control of persons ===
Under Section 8, the police may order any or all person in the proclaimed area to be excluded from such area, or from any places or buildings situated within that area. If any person wish to enter or remain in the exclusion area, the police may conduct a search on such person. If a person failed to comply with the exclusion order or any accompanying instructions, the police may remove such person from the area.

Under Section 13, the police may also restrict the movement of a person in a proclaimed area, who has been involved with, or is likely to cause breach of peace; or is likely prejudicial to the maintenance or restoration of public order in the proclaimed area. This includes one's association with any other persons or organizations that may cause breach of peace or be prejudicial to public order; or due to his words or conducts. This section is mainly targeted at potential riot agitators.

The police is empowered to either exclude such a person from any or all parts of the proclaimed area; or to force such person to reside in a certain area (may be inside or outside the danger area); or to impose curfew order on him; or to order him to periodically report to the police; or to require him to enter into a good behaviour bond; or any combination of the above.

=== Discontinuance of telecommunication services ===
Under Section 9, the Minister may also order a telecommunication authority in the proclaimed area to partially or completely cut off the use of telecommunication services to specific group of persons or the entire public, notwithstanding any other written laws or agreements to the contrary.

=== Commandering properties and vehicles ===
Section 11 of the Act enabled the Chief Police Officer and any police officers authorized by him to requisite or commandeer any movable and immovable properties in the proclaimed area, such as land, buildings, vehicles, vessels, and aircraft, for police uses. The Commissioner of Police may even commandeer vehicles, vessels and aircraft outside the proclaimed area.

However, the Chief Minister or Menteri Besar of any state can revoke any requisition made by the police, as long as they have the concurrence of the Home Minister. Further, the police may not commandeer vessel that is above 100 tons gross tonnage, any KTMB railway rolling stock, and any aircraft, unless prior approval has been obtained from the Home Minister.

Meanwhile, section 12 dictated that compensation to the owners of the properties commandeered by the police should be assessed according to applicable law.

=== Search without warrant ===
In a proclaimed area, any police officer is empowered under section 15 to stop and search any person or vehicle in public areas without warrant, on the grounds of ascertaining whether such person or vehicle is carrying offensive weapons or subversive documents. For police officers with the rank of sergeant or above, they are granted with even greater power and may without warrant (1) search any person or vehicle in private places, (2) search any premises, and (3) search any civilian vessel, aircraft and vehicle, on the same grounds.

=== Arrest without warrant ===
Under section 17, the police is allowed to arrest any person suspected of committing an offence related to unlawful assembly, rioting, affray or theft under the Penal Code, or any offence under this Act, without a warrant. The police in a proclaimed area is also empowered to without warrant arrest any person whose a control order under section 13 has been imposed, or whose the police deemed a control order should be imposed. Additionally, persons arrested on the grounds of unlawful assembly, rioting, affray, theft, mischief and arson related crimes under the Penal Code in a proclaimed area are not allowed to be granted bail.

Further, when conducting arrest, the police is allowed to use necessary force to effect the arrest depending on the circumstances of the case, and such use of force include the use of lethal force.

=== Recalling firearms ===
When a proclaimed area is in force, the Minister may through section 19 of the Act prohibits the use and possession of firearms in any part of Malaysia (including areas outside of the proclaimed area) on the ground of public interest, notwithstanding that such firearms have previously been lawfully granted license or permit under other firearms law. For doing so, the Minister may order for the recalling of firearms and the cancellation or suspension of license or permit for firearms.

== See also ==
- Freedom of assembly
- Freedom of movement
- Protest policing
- Public order crimes
- Public security
- Riot control
- State of emergency
