= List of hartals in Bangladesh =

This is a list of hartals (labour strikes or collective actions) occurring in Bangladesh (including East Pakistan).

== List ==
Date (ymd)	Total days	Hartal called by	Reason	Casualties and damage	Notes
1962 – 1971	15				then East Pakistan
1972 – 1975	5				
1981 – 1987	59				
1991 – 1996	266	Awami League, called for hartal of unknown number of days			
1996 – 2001	215	BNP, called for 59-day hartal			
2001 – 2007	Unknown	Bangladesh Awami League, called for 173-day hartal			
2008 – 2009	Unknown	BNP, Bangladesh Jamaat-e-Islami, Workers party, Awami League, called for 15-day hartal			
2010 – 2013 April	Unknown	Awami League, called for 17-day hartal			
2010-11-30	1 (all day)	BNP	Opposing Khaleda Zia's eviction after 30-year-long stay in military house		1193rd hartal in the history of Bangladesh
2013-04-02	1 (all day)	Bangladesh Islami Chhatra Shibir	opposed to sending Delwar Hossain Sayeedi on police remand for questioning.		
2013-04-09	1 (all day)	BNP	protesting against courts sending its top 17 leaders to jail.		
2013-04-10	1 (all day)	BNP	protesting against courts sending its top 17 leaders to jail.		
2013-04-11	1 (all day)	Bangladesh Islami Chhatra Shibir	to press for the release of Shibir President Delwar Hussen.	1 person killed in khulna	
2013-04-23	1 (all day)	BNP	demands for release of top leaders.	10 people injured; 5 buses torched on night before hartal.	
2013-04-24	1 (all day)	BNP	demands for release of top leaders.		
2013-11-26 to 28	3	BNP			
2023-11-15	3	BNP	to press for neutral polls.		
2023-11-19	2	Labour Party			
2023-11-22	2	BNP	protesting the unveiling of the polls schedule by the Election Commission.		
2023-12-19	1	BNP			
