= Gherao =

Form of protest, typical of India

Gherao, meaning "encirclement", is a word which denotes a tactic used by labour activists and union leaders in India; it is similar to picketing. Usually, a group of people would surround a politician or a government building until their demands are met, or answers given. This principle was introduced as a formal means of protest in the labour sector by Subodh Banerjee, the PWD and Labour Minister in the 1967 and 1969 United Front Governments of West Bengal, respectively.

Owing to its popularity, the word “gherao” was added to the Concise Oxford English Dictionary in 2004. Page 598 has the entry: “Gherao: n (pl. gheraos). Indian; a protest in which workers prevent employers leaving a place of work until demands are met; Origin: From Hindi” and Subodh Banerjee was referred to as the Gherao minister.

Gherao was being used by farmers against government buildings in the 2020–2021 Indian farmers' protest.

== See also ==
- Bandh
- Bossnapping
- Hartal
- Human chain (politics)
- Lock-in
- Picketing
- Raasta roko
- Rail roko
- Escrache
- Dharna
