= 1967 Penang Hartal riot =

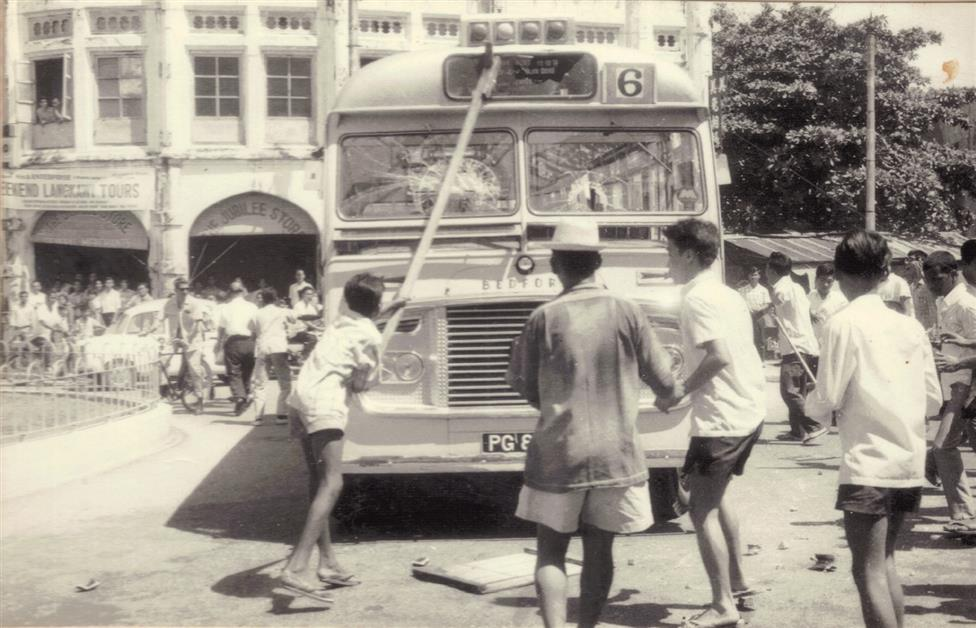
- Group of rioters smashing on a bus during the riot.
- Date: 24 November – 13 December 1967
- Location: Penang
- Caused by: Protest against the devaluation of the old currency by the administration of Tunku Abdul Rahman, the first prime minister.
- Methods: Protest, general strike, riot

Parties
Penang Labour Party	Government of Malaysia

Lead figures
Lim Kean Siew	

Casualties and losses
- 27 killed 137 injured

The 1967 Penang Hartal riot (Malay: Hartal Pulau Pinang 1967) occurred on 24 November 1967 in response to the devaluation of the Malayan dollar against the British pound sterling and the newly established Malaysian dollar.

== Cause of the riot ==
The riot began as a peaceful protest organised by the Labour Party over the devaluation of the Malayan dollar against the British pound sterling.

Malaysian at that time had two currencies in circulation. One was the old Malayan dollar and the other was the new Malaysian dollar. Both were trading at par and valued at 8.57 dollars per pound. The pegging of the local currency to the pound was part of Malaysia's membership in the Sterling area. The new Malaysian dollar was introduced on 12 June 1967 as the currency union between Malaysia, Singapore and Brunei came to an end.

Five months after the introduction of the new Malaysian dollar, the United Kingdom government which was already struggling from the burden of post-World War II rebuilding decided to devalue the pound sterling by 14.3% against the US dollar as part of effort to improve its national competitiveness. Then Prime Minister, Tunku Abdul Rahman took the opportunity to devalue the old Malayan dollar by 15% against the pound by and the new Malaysian dollar. The devaluation caused much disagreement among Malaysians who held the old currency, which led to the organisation of the hartal.

== The riot ==
However, the protest turned violent with 27 died and 137 people injured. Conflicts emerged as some shops refused to participate in the hartal and were forced to shut down by protesters. Several cafes serving breakfast were attacked by protesters.

The federal government declared a 24-hour curfew beginning 8PM on the same day to overcome the riot.

== Aftermath ==
The federal government launched an operation codenamed "Operation X", which closed down the Labour Party. During the raid, the police discovered communist documents at the party headquarters, which suggested that the Communist Party of Malaya might have played a role in the hartal.

The old Malayan dollar itself continued to be used until January 16, 1969, albeit at a lower value.
