= Journal of South Asian Development =

- Discipline: Development studies
- Language: English
- Edited by: Vegard Iversen

Publication details
- History: 2006
- Publisher: SAGE Publications (India)
- Frequency: Triannual

Standard abbreviations
- ISO 4: J. South Asian Dev.

Indexing
- ISSN: 0973-1741 (print); 0973-1733 (web)

Links
- Journal homepage; Online access; Online archive

The Journal of South Asian Development is a peer-reviewed journal. It is a forum for discussing all facets of development in South Asia, comprising Afghanistan, Pakistan, India, Sri Lanka, Bangladesh, Nepal, Bhutan and the Maldives, and is published three times in a year by SAGE Publications. The Journal was launched in 2006.

It is a member of the Committee on Publication Ethics.

== Editorial Board ==
An Editorial Board, editors, associate editors, and a book review editor make up the Journal's editorial staff.

As of 2018, the editors include Vegard Iversen, Carol Upadhya, Geert De Neve, Joe Devine, and Sabyasachi Kar. The editorial board includes Ashutosh Varshney, Katy Gardner, Andrew Wyatt, Craig Jeffrey and Kaushik Basu among others.

== Abstracting and indexing ==
Journal of South Asian Development is abstracted and indexed in:

- Australian Business Deans Council
- CCC
- DeepDyve
- Dutch-KB
- EBSCO
- EconLit
- J-Gate
- OCLC
- Ohio
- Portico
- ProQuest: International Bibliography of the Social Sciences (IBSS)
- ProQuest-Illustrata
- Research Papers in Economics (RePEc)
- SCOPUS
- Social Sciences Citation Index (Web of Science)
