= Government of Perak =

Executive and legislative authorities governing the Malaysian state of Perak

State Government of Perak
- Kerajaan Negeri Perak
- State government

Overview
- Established: 31 August 1957; 69 years ago as a Malaysian state
- State: Perak
- Leader: Menteri Besar
- Appointed by: Sultan
- Main organ: Perak State Executive Council
- Responsible to: Perak State Legislative Assembly
- Annual budget: RM 1.61 Billion (2026)
- Headquarters: Perak Darul Ridzuan Building, Ipoh
- Website: www.perak.gov.my

The Government of Perak, officially the State Government of Perak, refers to the government authority of the Malaysian state of Perak. The state government adheres to and is created by both the Federal Constitution of Malaysia, the supreme law of Malaysia, and the Laws of the Constitution of Perak, the supreme law in Perak. The government of Perak is based in Ipoh, the state's capital city.

The state government consists of only two branches – executive and legislative. The Perak State Executive Council forms the executive branch, whilst the Perak State Legislative Assembly is the legislature of the state government. Perak's head of government is the Menteri Besar. The state government does not have a judiciary branch, as Malaysia's judicial system is a federalised system operating uniformly throughout the country.

== Executive ==
=== Head of government ===
The Menteri Besar is the head of government in Perak. He is officially appointed by the Sultan, Perak's head of state, on the basis of the latter's judgement that the former commands the confidence of the majority of the State Assemblymen in the Perak State Legislative Assembly. The Menteri Besar and his Executive Council shall be collectively responsible to Legislative Assembly. The Office of the Menteri Besar is situated inside Perak Darul Ridzuan Building in Ipoh.

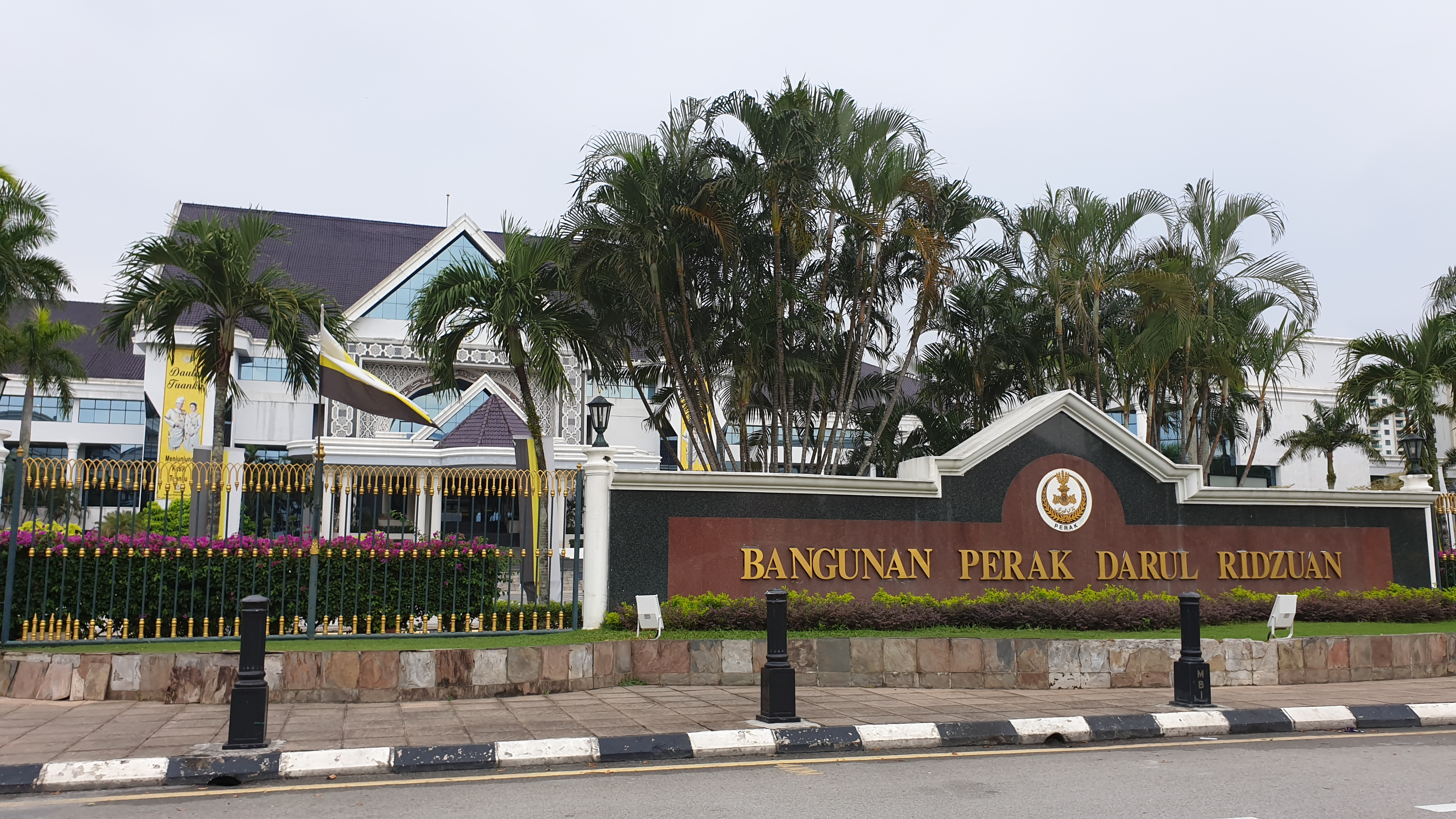
The Perak Darul Ridzuan Building houses the Office of the Menteri Besar of Perak, as well as the state legislative assembly and other state government offices.

The Menteri Besar of Perak is Saarani Mohammad of the Barisan Nasional (BN) coalition that formed a coalition government with Pakatan Harapan (PH) coalition in the state assembly. Saarani assumed office on 10 December 2020, having been elected as a Member of the State Legislative Assembly since the 1999 Perak state election.

=== Cabinet ===
The Perak State Executive Council forms the executive branch of the Perak state government and is analogous in function to the Malaysian federal Cabinet. The Executive Council is led by the Menteri Besar and made up of between four and 10 other State Assemblymen from the Perak State Legislative Assembly. Aside from these, three other ex officio members of the Executive Council are the State Secretary, the State Legal Adviser and the State Financial Officer.

Following the 2022 Perak state election, Saarani Mohamad was reappointed as the Menteri Besar after Pakatan Harapan (PH) and Barisan Nasional (BN) were elected to power and formed a coalition state government.

PH (7)	BN (4)
DAP (4); PKR (2); AMANAH (1)	UMNO (4)

Name	Portfolio	Party	Constituency	Term start	Term end
Saarani Mohamad (Menteri Besar)	Islamic Religion; Finance; Security; Land; Natural Resources; Economic Planning; Government-Linked Companies	BN (UMNO)	Kota Tampan	21 November 2022	Incumbent
Senior Exco; Mohd Zolkafly Harun	Rural Development; Plantation; Agriculture; Food Industry	BN (UMNO)	Lintang	22 November 2022	Incumbent
Salbiah Mohamed	Women; Family; Social Welfare; Entrepreneur Development	BN (UMNO)	Temengor	22 November 2022	Incumbent
Khairudin Abu Hanipah	Education; Higher Education; Youth and Sports	BN (UMNO)	Belanja	22 November 2022	Incumbent
Teh Kok Lim	Science; Environment; Green Technology	PH (DAP)	Aulong	22 November 2022	Incumbent
Loh Sze Yee	Tourism; Industry; Investment; Corridor Development	PH (DAP)	Jalong	22 November 2022	Incumbent
Sivanesan Achalingam	Human Resources; Health; Indian Community Affairs	PH (DAP)	Sungkai	22 November 2022	Incumbent
Woo Kah Leong	Domestic Trade; Cooperatives; Consumer Affairs; Chinese New Villages	PH (DAP)	Pasir Bedamar	22 November 2022	Incumbent
Sandrea Ng Shy Ching	Housing; Local Government	PH (PKR)	Teja	22 November 2022	Incumbent
Mohd Azlan Helmi	Communication; Multimedia; Non-governmental Organisations	PH (PKR)	Tualang Sekah	22 November 2022	Incumbent
Mohammad Nizar Jamaluddin	Infrastructure; Energy; Water; Public Transport	PH (AMANAH)	Sungai Rapat	22 November 2022	Incumbent

=== Ex-officio members ===
Portfolio	Name
State secretary	Ahmad Suaidi Abdul Rahim
State legal advisor	Azmir Shah Zainal Abidin
State financial officer	Mohd Zaki Mahyudin

== Legislature ==
Composition of the Perak State Legislative Assembly after the 2022 Perak state election. Pakatan Harapan (PH) holds 24 seats. Barisan Nasional (BN) holds 9 seats. Perikatan Nasional (PN) holds 25 seats. 1 Former PN member became independent on 13 February 2026.

The Perak State Legislative Assembly is the legislative branch of the Perak state government. The unicameral legislature consists of 59 seats that represent the 59 state constituencies within Perak, with each constituency being represented by an elected State Assemblyman. The Legislative Assembly convenes at the Perak Darul Ridzuan Building in Ipoh.

The legislature has a maximum mandate of five years by law and follows a multi-party system; the ruling party (or coalition) is elected through a first-past-the-post system. The Sultan may dissolve the legislature at any time and usually does so upon the advice of the Menteri Besar.

A Speaker is elected by the Legislative Assembly to preside over the proceedings and debates of the legislature. The Speaker may or may not be an elected State Assemblyman; in the case of the latter, the elected Speaker shall become a member of the Legislative Assembly additional to the elected State Assemblymen already in the legislature.

== Perak State Government Secretariat ==
- Internal Audit Division
- Corporate Division
- Integrity Unit

=== Development Cluster ===
- Local Government Unit
- State Economic Planning Unit

=== Management Cluster ===
- Digital Division
- Human Resources Management Division
- Management Service Division
- Perak State Executive Council and Legislative Assembly
- Office of Private Secretary for Menteri Besar
- Perak State Sports Council

== Departments, statutory bodies and subsidiaries ==
=== Departments ===
- Perak State Finance Office
- Perak Syariah Judiciary Department
- Perak Syariah Prosecution Department
- Perak State Islamic Religious Affairs Department
- Perak Public Service Commission
- Office of Lands and Mines Perak
- Perak State Mufti Office
- Perak Irrigation and Drainage Department
- Perak State Forestry Department
- Perak Social Welfare Department
- Perak Town and Country Planning Department (PLANMalaysia@Perak)
- Department of Veterinary Services of Perak
- Perak Public Works Department
- Perak State Agriculture Department

=== Statutory bodies ===
- Perak Islamic Religious and Malay Customs Council
- Perak State Public Library Corporation
- Perak State Museum Board
- Perak State Agriculture Development Corporation
- Perak State Development Corporation
- Universiti Sultan Azlan Shah
- Perak Water Board
- Menteri Besar Incorporated
- Institut Darul Ridzuan
- State Secretariat Incorporated
- Digital Perak Corporation Holdings
- InvestPerak
- Perak State Parks Corporation
- Perak Foundation
- Darul Ridzuan Capacity Building Foundation
- Pusat Aspirasi Anak Perak
- Perak Water Resources Management Board

=== Subsidiaries ===
- Perak Islamic Religious and Malay Customs Council
  - Perak Islamic Economy Corporation
- Menteri Besar Incorporated
  - Amanjaya Natural Resources
  - Amanjaya Property Venture
  - Pengurusan Pasir Perak Sdn Bhd
  - Tourism Perak Management Berhad
- Perak State Development Corporation
  - Perak Industrial Resources
  - Star Career
  - Destination Perak
  - Perak Halal Corporation
  - Perak Teamwork
  - Perak E-Organization
  - Perak Hi-Tech Park
  - Perak Equity
  - Perak Bio Corporation
  - Brand Equity
  - Niche Phoenix
  - Terra Projects Sdn Bhd (51%)
  - MajuPerak Holdings Berhad (52.9%)
  - Perak Corporation Berhad (55.12%)

== District and Land Offices ==
- Bagan Datuk District
- Batang Padang District
- Hulu Perak District
  - Lenggong Subdistrict
  - Pengkalan Hulu Subdistrict
- Hilir Perak District
- Kampar District
- Kerian District
- Kinta District
  - Ipoh Subdistrict
- Kuala Kangsar District
  - Sungai Siput Subdistrict
- Larut, Matang and Selama District
  - Selama Subdistrict
- Manjung District
- Muallim District
- Perak Tengah District
  - Kampung Gajah Subdistrict

== Local governments ==
- Batu Gajah District Council
- Gerik District Council
- Ipoh City Council
- Kampar District Council
- Kerian District Council
- Kuala Kangsar Municipal Council
- Lenggong District Council
- Manjung Municipal Council
- Pengkalan Hulu District Council
- Perak Tengah District Council
- Selama District Council
- Taiping Municipal Council
- Tanjung Malim District Council
- Tapah District Council
- Teluk Intan Municipal Council
