= Devaraj (name) =

Devaraj is both a given name and a surname. Notable people with the name include:

- Devaraj (born 1960), Indian actor
- Devaraj Bangera, Indian bishop
- A. Devaraj, Indian politician
- B. E. Devaraj, Indian translator
- Michael Jeyakumar Devaraj (born 1955), Malaysian politician
- Muttaiah Devaraj (born 1938), Sri Lankan cricketer
- Neal Devaraj (born 1980), American chemist
- P. P. Devaraj (born 1929), Sri Lankan politician
- Prajwal Devaraj (born 1987), Indian actor
- T Devaraj (born 1924), Malaysian medical doctor
- V. M. Devaraj, Indian politician
- D. Devaraj Urs (1915–1982), Indian politician
