= Universiti Sultan Azlan Shah =

Private university in Malaysia

Sultan Azlan Shah University (USAS)
- Universiti Sultan Azlan Shah Malaysia
- Former name: Kolej Islam Darul Ridzuan
- Motto: Rahmatan lil 'Alamin
- Motto in English: Mercy to the World
- Type: Private university
- Established: 1999
- Chairman: Prof Tan Sri Dato’ Seri Noor Azlan Ghazali
- Chancellor: Sultan Nazrin Muizzuddin Shah of Perak
- Vice-Chancellor: Prof Dato’ Dr Wan Sabri Bin Wan Yusof
- Location: Kuala Kangsar, Perak, Malaysia
- Campus: Bukit Chandan
- Colours: Blue, white and yellow
- Website: www.usas.edu.my

Sultan Azlan Shah University (Malay: Universiti Sultan Azlan Shah) (USAS) is a private university in Malaysia owned by the Perak State Government. Situated in Kuala Kangsar, Perak, it was previously known as Sultan Azlan Shah Islamic University College (KUISAS).

== History ==
Initially named as the Darul Ridzuan Islamic College (KISDAR), USAS was founded under the authority of the Islamic Religious Schools Enactment 1996. KISDAR was initiated at the behest of the then Sultan of Perak Darul Ridzuan, the late Sultan Azlan Muhibbuddin Shah in 1986.

The institution was later realised in 1999 with its temporary campus located at Jalan Dato’ Seri Shaari, Off Jalan Raja DiHilir, Ipoh and officiated by Sultan Azlan Muhibbuddin Shah on 16 October 1999.

KISDAR was established under the Enactment No. 3 Year 2000, Perak Darul Ridzuan State Government Enactment. The enactment was tabled and approved by the Perak State Council on 19 November 2001, and was granted the legal title by Sultan Azlan Muhibbuddin Shah on 6 March 2002.

On 8 February 2006, the Perak State Government had approved the construction of KISDAR's permanent campus on a 50-acre land, conferred by the then Regent of Perak, Raja Dr. Nazrin Shah as “waqf” at Chandan Putri, Kuala Kangsar. The construction of the permanent campus at a cost of RM 66 million was completed in 2008. On 16 July 2009, then Sultan of Perak Darul Ridzuan, Sultan Azlan Muhibbuddin Shah officiated the permanent campus of KISDAR.

KISDAR was later upgraded to university college status, known as Sultan Azlan Shah Islamic University College (KUISAS) and registered under the Private Higher Educational Institutions Act 1996 (Act 555) on 4 March 2013. Three years later, on 10 June 2016, the Prime Minister of Malaysia had proclaimed the upgrade of KUISAS as a full-fledged university with immediate effect. Subsequently, Universiti Sultan Azlan Shah (USAS) was officially established on 15 June 2016.
