= Kuala Kangsar District =

Kuala Kangsar District Kole Kangso (Perak Malay)
- District of Perak
- Daerah Kuala Kangsar
- Seal

- Location of Kuala Kangsar District in Perak
- Interactive map of Kuala Kangsar District
- Location of Kuala Kangsar District in Malaysia
- Coordinates: 4°45′N 100°55′E
- Country: Malaysia
- State: Perak
- Seat: Kuala Kangsar
- Local area government(s): Kuala Kangsar Municipal Council

Government
  - District officer: Mian Jamil Mian Zakaria

Area
  - Total: 2,563.61 km^{2} (989.82 sq mi)

Population (2010)
  - Total: 156,295
  - Estimate (2015): 163,800
  - Density: 60.9668/km^{2} (157.903/sq mi)
- Time zone: UTC+8 (MST)
  - Summer (DST): UTC+8 (Not observed)
- Postcode: 31050, 300xx, 335xx-338xx
- Calling code: +6-05
- Vehicle registration plates: A

The Kuala Kangsar District (Perak Malay: Kole Kangso) is a district in Perak, Malaysia. Kuala Kangsar shares its borders with Larut, Matang and Selama at the west, Hulu Perak at the north, Gua Musang of Kelantan at the east, Kinta at the south, Perak Tengah and Manjung at the southwest. The seat of this district is the town of Kuala Kangsar.

== Administrative divisions ==
Map of Kuala Kangsar District

Kuala Kangsar District is divided into 9 mukims, which are:

- Chegar Galah
- Kampung Buaia
- Kota Lama Kanan
- Kota Lama Kiri
- Lubuk Merbau
- Pulau Kamiri
- Sayong
- Senggang
- Sungai Siput

== Demographics ==
Historical population
Year	Pop.	±%
1991	146,684	—
2000	144,418	−1.5%
2010	155,592	+7.7%
2020	176,060	+13.2%

The following is based on Department of Statistics Malaysia 2010 census.

Ethnic groups in Kuala Kangsar, 2010 census
Ethnicity	Population	Percentage
Bumiputera	100,206	64.1%
Chinese	34,796	22.3%
Indian	21,028	13.5%
Others	265	0.2%
Total	156,295	100%

== Federal Parliament and State Assembly Seats ==
List of Kuala Kangsar district representatives in the Federal Parliament (Dewan Rakyat)

Parliament	Seat Name	Member of Parliament	Party
P61	Padang Rengas	Azahari Hasan	Perikatan Nasional (PPBM)
P62	Sungai Siput	Kesavan Subramaniam	Pakatan Harapan (PKR)
P67	Kuala Kangsar	Iskandar Dzulkarnain Abdul Khalid	Perikatan Nasional (PPBM)

List of Kuala Kangsar district representatives in the State Legislative Assembly.

Parliament	State	Seat Name	State Assemblyman	Party
P61	N19	Chenderoh	Syed Lukman Hakim Syed Mohd Zin	Perikatan Nasional (PPBM)
P61	N20	Lubok Merbau	Azizi Mohamed Ridzuan	Perikatan Nasional (PAS)
P62	N21	Lintang	Mohd Zolkafly Harun	Barisan Nasional (UMNO)
P62	N22	Jalong	Loh Sze Yee	Pakatan Harapan (DAP)
P67	N34	Bukit Chandan	Hashim Bujang	Perikatan Nasional (PPBM)
P67	N35	Manong	Burhanuddin Ahmad	Perikatan Nasional (PAS)

== See also ==
- Districts of Malaysia
