= Uma Sambanthan =

Malaysian activist (1929–2020)

Toh Puan Uma Sambanthan
- Born: Umasundari Subramaniam; 8 September 1929; Bruas, Perak, Malaysia
- Died: 31 January 2020 (aged 90); Kuala Lumpur, Malaysia
- Spouse: Tun V.T. Sambanthan
- Parent(s): O.M. Subramaniam; Jayalakshmi Swaminathan Sastrigal

Toh Puan Umasundari Sambanthan née Subramaniam (8 September 1929 – 31 January 2020) was a Malaysian activist, social worker and leading figure of the cooperative movement. She was also the wife of Tun V.T. Sambanthan, former Malayan Labour Minister, president of the Malaysian Indian Congress (MIC) and regarded as one of the founding fathers of Malaysia.

== Early life ==
She was born on 8 September 1929 in Bruas, Perak, to O.M. Subramaniam, a senior officer with the Public Works Department and his wife Jayalakshmi Swaminathan Sastrigal. Uma was educated at the Anglo-Chinese School in Sungai Siput, Perak, where she won the Best Indian Student of the Year scholarship in 1942.

However, her education was interrupted by the Japanese Occupation from 1942 to 1945.

After the war, she went to India to study science at the University of Madras, majoring in chemistry and graduating with First Class honours. She then studied for a master's degree at the Presidency College, Chennai in India.

Upon returning home, she taught in Singapore for three years but gave up her teaching career and returned to Malaya in 1956, when she married the young Sambanthan, who was then the serving president of the MIC political party.

== Independence Day memories ==
She was only 27 years old during the proclamation of independence on 31 August 1957. She still remembered what she wore on that momentous occasion — an off-white silk sari with a red border, a personal favourite as it had been an engagement gift from Sambanthan.

"It was so symbolic... a sign that we were free of the colonial regime, free to think for ourselves, free to lead our own country", she said.

Uma and Sambanthan stood behind Tunku Abdul Rahman during the ceremony when the Union Jack was lowered and the Federation of Malaya flag was raised.

The feeling of being present at the historical event on the eve of the country's Independence Day was indescribable, said Uma.

"Many years have passed, but that feeling still lingers and I think it will live in me forever", she said.

== Social contributions ==
=== Pre-Independence ===
Prior to Malayan independence and during the early years of independence, Uma was involved in making rural women aware of the benefits of Malayan citizenship. Her lifelong battle has been to bring uneducated rubber-tappers into mainstream national life. In the 1950s, this meant getting Indian women to sign up as citizens.

=== After independence ===
Uma was well known for her charity work and her work to raise the status of women, especially in rural areas, and children. She was actively involved in many women's organisations and was one of the founders of the National Council of Women's Organisations (NCWO).

In 1956, she was made a founder-life member of the NCWO and held the presidency for four years.

In 1960, she was the co-founder of Persatuan Sri Ramakrishna Sarada and continued to be its general-secretary.

She was also an active member of the Associated Country Women of the World (ACWW), helping to organise the Asian regional conference of the ACWW in 1961 and participating in another ACWW conference in Manila in 1966.

From 1960 to 1972, she was involved in the Children's International Art Class which was committed to encouraging young children to have hobbies.

She was also the chairman and director of the National Land Finance Co- operative Society (NLFC) from 1980 to 1995 and its president in 1995 and 1996. The co-operative was established by her husband to prevent the fragmentation of estates in the early `60s.

In 1996, she attended the Asian Regional Conference of the International Cooperative Alliance in Kuala Lumpur. She was a member of the Asian Regional Women's Committee formed at that meeting.

She kept herself busy and helped out with the Sri Ramakrishna Sarada Society's early childhood development programme until her death in 2020.

== Awards and recognition ==
In 1992, she was awarded the Tun Fatimah Gold Medal award by the NCWO in conjunction with the Women's Day celebrations.

== Family ==
She is related to Tan Sri Rama Iyer, who is married to her cousin, Puan Sri Vijayalakshmi. He is the former Secretary-General of the Primary Industries Ministry.

== Death ==
Uma died on 31 January 2020. She was 90 years old. She leaves behind her daughter, Deva Kunjari, who is a lawyer. Her remains was cremated at Sungai Siput Hindu crematorium on the morning of 2 February.

Deputy Prime Minister, Dato Seri Dr Wan Azizah Wan Ismail conveyed her condolences to late Uma's family. Minister of Human Resources, M. Kulasegaran also expressed his sympathy and condolences to Uma’s family. Kulasegaran praised her well known charity work and as an advocate for women's issues and rights. Kulasegaran also told that she was devoted in serving her country and her people.
