= Lintang =

Lintang may refer to:

- Lintang (state constituency)
- Lintang language
- Kampung Lintang
