= Devamany Krishnasamy =

Malaysian politician

Yang Hormat Dato' Sri Devamany Krishnasamy SSAP DIMP SMP PPT
- தேவமணி கிருஷ்ணசாமி

Deputy Minister in the Prime Minister's Department
- In office 27 June 2016 – 9 May 2018 (Economic Planning Unit)
- Monarchs: Abdul Halim; Muhammad V
- Prime Minister: Najib Razak
- Minister: Abdul Rahman Dahlan
- Preceded by: Waytha Moorthy Ponnusamy
- Succeeded by: Mohd Radzi Md Jidin as Deputy Minister of Economic Affairs
- Constituency: Senator
- In office 19 March 2008 – 15 May 2013 (Unity and Performance Management)
- Monarchs: Mizan Zainal Abidin; Abdul Halim
- Prime Minister: Najib Razak
- Minister: Bernard Giluk Dompok (2008–2009); Koh Tsu Koon (2008–2013); Idris Jala (2009–2015)
- Preceded by: Position Established
- Succeeded by: Position Abolished
- Constituency: Cameron Highlands

Speaker of the Perak State Legislative Assembly
- In office 28 June 2013 – 30 June 2016
- Monarchs: Azlan Shah; Nazrin Shah
- Deputy: Nasarudin Hashim
- Menteri Besar: Zambry Abdul Kadir
- Preceded by: Ganesan Retanam
- Succeeded by: Thangasvari Suppiah
- Constituency: non–MP (Barisan Nasional)

Member of the Malaysian Parliament for Cameron Highlands, Pahang
- In office 21 March 2004 – 5 May 2013
- Preceded by: New constituency
- Succeeded by: Palanivel Govindasamy (BN–MIC)
- Majority: 6,260 (2004); 3,117 (2008)

Personal details
- Born: Devamany s/o S. Krishnasamy; 10 September 1958 (age 68) Semanggol, Perak, Federation of Malaya (now Malaysia)
- Citizenship: Malaysian
- Party: Malaysian Indian Congress (MIC)
- Other political affiliations: Barisan Nasional (BN)
- Spouse: Saraswathy Nallaiah
- Children: 3 daughters
- Education: University of Malaya (UM)
- Occupation: Politician

Devamany s/o S. Krishnasamy (Tamil: தேவமணி கிருஷ்ணசாமி, romanized: Tēvamaṇi kiruṣṇacāmi; born 10 September 1958), also known as S. K. Devamany, is a Malaysian politician. He was the Deputy President of the Malaysian Indian Congress (MIC), a component party of the Barisan Nasional (BN) coalition. He served as the Senator and the Deputy Minister in the Prime Minister's Department (EPU). Previously, he served Speaker of the Perak State Legislative Assembly from 28 June 2013 to 30 June 2016. He formerly served as Deputy Minister in the Prime Minister's Department under the Barisan Nasional government while being member of the Member of Parliament of Malaysia for the Cameron Highlands constituency in Pahang for two terms from 21 March 2004 to 5 May 2013.

== Personal life ==
Devamany was born on 10 September 1958 in Semanggol, Perak and received his early education at King Edward VII School in Taiping. In 1978, he qualified as a teacher from the Special Education Teachers' Institute in Cheras, Kuala Lumpur. He then furthered his studies and graduated with a degree in Malay Literature from University Malaya in 1982.

Dewamany is married to Saraswathy Nallaiah and the couple has three daughters.

== Political career ==
Devamany was picked to be the treasurer general of Malaysian Indian Congress (MIC) replacing Tan Sri Mahalingam in 2008. He becomes MIC current Deputy President after winning the party re-election in 2015 when ROS nullified the 1 December 2013 party's earlier election in which he failed to retain the Vice-President position he previously held since 2009.

Devamany was first elected to the Parliament of Malaysia in the 2004 election for the seat of Cameron Highlands, Pahang. He held his seat in the 2008 election despite widespread losses by the MIC, leaving him as one of only three MIC members of the Dewan Rakyat. After the 2008 election, Devamany was appointed a Deputy Minister in the Prime Minister's Department.

For the 2013 Malaysian General Election, Devamany was selected to contest the Sungai Siput, Perak parliamentary constituency. However, he was defeated by incumbent Michael Jeyakumar from Socialist Party of Malaysia (PSM) who had contested under the tickets of People's Justice Party (PKR).

On 28 June 2013, he was voted in as the new Perak State Legislative Assembly Speaker, receiving 31 votes to his opponent's 28. He served as the Perak State Legislative Assembly Speaker from June 2013 to June 2016.

Devamany was appointed as Senator and once again as the Deputy Minister in the Prime Minister's Department (EPU) in the federal government on 27 June 2016.

== Election results ==
Parliament of Malaysia
| Year | Constituency | Candidate | Votes | Pct | Opponent(s) | Votes | Pct | Ballots cast | Majority | Turnout |
|---|---|---|---|---|---|---|---|---|---|---|
| 2004 | P078 Cameron Highlands | Devamany Krishnasamy (MIC) | 10,226 | 72.05% | Apalasamy Jataliah (DAP) | 3,966 | 27.95% | 15,202 | 6,260 | 65.92% |
| 2008 | P078 Cameron Highlands | Devamany Krishnasamy (MIC) | 9,164 | 60.25% | Apalasamy Jataliah (DAP) | 6,047 | 39.75% | 16,456 | 3,117 | 70.14% |
| 2013 | P062 Sungai Siput | Devamany Krishnasamy (MIC) | 18,800 | 45.17% | Michael Jeyakumar Devaraj (PKR) | 21,593 | 51.89% | 41,617 | 2,793 | 80.70% |
| 2013 | P062 Sungai Siput | Devamany Krishnasamy (MIC) | 18,800 | 45.17% | Nagalingam Singaravelloo (IND) | 197 | 0.47% | 41,617 | 2,793 | 80.70% |
| 2018 | P062 Sungai Siput | Devamany Krishnasamy (MIC) | 15,210 | 35.60% | Kesavan Subramaniam (PKR) | 20,817 | 48.72% | 42,726 | 5,607 | 77.68% |
| 2018 | P062 Sungai Siput | Devamany Krishnasamy (MIC) | 15,210 | 35.60% | Ishak Ibrahim (PAS) | 5,194 | 13.84% | 42,726 | 5,607 | 77.68% |
| 2018 | P062 Sungai Siput | Devamany Krishnasamy (MIC) | 15,210 | 35.60% | Michael Jeyakumar Devaraj (PSM) | 1,505 | 3.52% | 42,726 | 5,607 | 77.68% |

== Honours ==
- Perak
  - Recipient of the Distinguished Conduct Medal (PPT) (1998)
- Pahang
  - Knight Grand Companion of the Order of Sultan Ahmad Shah of Pahang (SSAP) – Dato' Sri (2012)
  - Knight Companion of the Order of the Crown of Pahang (DIMP) – Dato' (2008)
  - Companion of the Order of the Crown of Pahang (SMP) (2007)
