= Thangasvari Suppiah =

Malaysian politician

Yang Berbahagia Dato' Thangasvari Suppiah DPMP PMP PPT KMN AMN

Speaker of the Perak State Legislative Assembly
- In office 9 August 2016 – 2 July 2018
- Monarch: Nazrin Shah
- Preceded by: Devamany Krishnasamy
- Succeeded by: Ngeh Koo Ham
- Constituency: Non-MLA (Barisan Nasional)

Personal details
- Born: Thangasvari a/p Suppiah
- Party: Malaysian Indian Congress (MIC)
- Other political affiliations: Barisan Nasional (BN)
- Occupation: Politician, lawyer

Thangasvari d/o Suppiah (Tamil: தங்கஸ்வரி சுப்பையா), also known as S. Thangasvari, is a Malaysian politician. She served as Speaker of the Perak State Legislative Assembly from August 2016 to July 2018. She is a member of Malaysian Indian Congress (MIC), a component party of Barisan Nasional (BN).

== Political career ==
Thangasvari Suppiah first contested in the Hutan Melintang seat however lost to PKR candidate, Kesavan Subramaniam. On 9 August 2016, she was elected as new speaker of the Perak State Legislative Assembly, succeed her party colleague, Devamany S. Krishnasamy was appointed as Deputy Minister in the Prime Minister's Department. She was also the first woman appointed as speaker. After the 2018 Perak state election, she was succeeded by Ngeh Koo Ham from DAP as new speaker of the Perak State Legislative Assembly.

== Election results ==
Perak State Legislative Assembly
Year	Constituency	Candidate	Votes	Pct	Opponent(s)	Votes	Pct	Ballots cast	Majority	Turnout
2008	N54 Hutan Melintang	Thangasvari Suppiah (MIC)	6,083	43.80%	Kesavan Subramaniam (PKR)	7,804	56.20%	14,556	1,721	70.12%

== Honours ==
- Malaysia
  - Officer of the Order of the Defender of the Realm (KMN) (2008)
  - Member of the Order of the Defender of the Realm (AMN) (2006)
- Perak
  - Knight Commander of the Order of the Perak State Crown (DPMP) – Dato' (2017)
  - Commander of the Order of the Perak State Crown (PMP) (2009)
  - Recipient of the Distinguished Conduct Medal (PPT) (2002)
