= V. T. Sambanthan =

Malaysian politician and founding father (1919–1979)

Yang Amat Berbahagia Tun V.T. Sambanthan SSM PMN
- திருஞானசம்பந்தன்
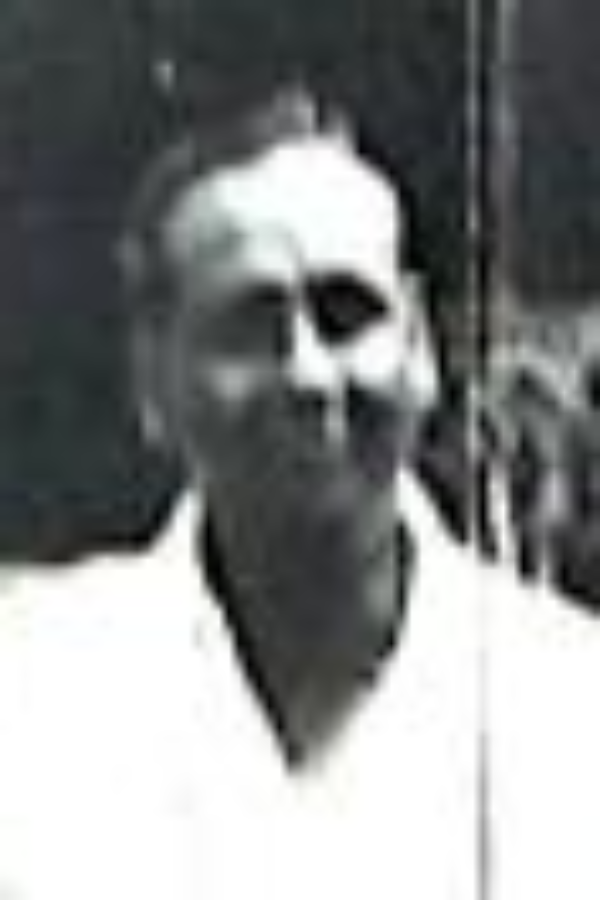
- Sambanthan in 1955

Prime Minister of Malaysia (Acting)
- In office 3 August 1973 – 10 August 1973
- Monarch: Abdul Halim
- Preceded by: Abdul Razak Hussein
- Succeeded by: Abdul Razak Hussein

Minister of National Unity
- In office 1 January 1972 – 1974
- Monarch: Abdul Halim
- Prime Minister: Abdul Razak Hussein
- Constituency: Sungai Siput

Minister of Works, Posts and Telecommunications
- In office 1 September 1957 – 31 December 1971
- Monarchs: Abdul Rahman; Hisamuddin; Putra; Ismail Nasiruddin; Abdul Halim
- Prime Minister: Tunku Abdul Rahman; Abdul Razak Hussein
- Preceded by: Sardon Jubir
- Succeeded by: Abdul Ghani Gilong
- Constituency: Sungai Siput

Minister of Labour
- In office 1955–1957
- Prime Minister: Tunku Abdul Rahman
- Preceded by: Position established
- Succeeded by: Omar Yoke Lin Ong (Labour and Social Welfare)
- Constituency: Sungai Siput

5th President of the Malaysian Indian Congress
- In office May 1955 – 30 June 1973
- Preceded by: K. L. Devaser
- Succeeded by: V. Manickavasagam

Member of the Malaysian Parliament for Sungai Siput
- In office 27 July 1955 – 30 June 1973
- Preceded by: Constituency created
- Succeeded by: Samy Vellu

Personal details
- Born: Thomas Sambanthan s/o Victor Veerasamy; 16 June 1919 Sungai Siput, Perak, Federated Malay States, British Malaya (now Malaysia)
- Died: 18 May 1979 (aged 59) Kuala Lumpur, Malaysia
- Party: Malaysian Indian Congress (MIC)
- Spouse: Toh Puan Umasundari Sambanthan
- Children: Deva Kunjari
- Education: Annamalai University
- Occupation: Politician

Tun Thirunyana Sambanthan s/o Veerasamy (Tamil: திருஞானசம்பந்தன், romanized: Tiruñāṉacampantaṉ; 16 June 1919 – 18 May 1979), also known as V.T. Sambanthan, was a Malayan and Malaysian politician who served as Minister of National Unity from January 1972 to 1974, Minister of Works, Posts and Telecommunications from April 1956 to December 1971, Minister of Health from 1957 to 1959, Minister of Labour from 1955 to 1957, Member of Parliament (MP) for Sungai Siput from July 1955 to June 1973, acting Prime Minister on 3 August 1973 for only 10 days and 5th President of the Malayan Indian Congress and later Malaysian Indian Congress (MIC) from May 1955 to his removal from the party presidency in June 1973 by the party members. He is widely known as one of the founding fathers of Malaysia representing one of the three main ethnicities, people of Indian origin along with Tunku Abdul Rahman representing Malay ethnicity and Tan Cheng Lock representing the Chinese ethnicity.

Sambanthan was one of the leading Indian leaders who played a prominent role in the independence movement in Malaya. As president of the MIC during this important period of transition, he worked closely with Alliance Party leader Tunku Abdul Rahman and they developed a close personal bond.

He is credited with three important developments in Malaysian political history: the consolidation of the Malayan (now Malaysian) Indian Congress, its transformation into a mass-based party, and its integral role as a partner in the current ruling alliance.

The entry of the MIC into the multi-communal Alliance in 1955 contributed greatly to enhancing the coalition's image as the main representative of the three main communities in Malaya.

The finest hour was achieved on 31 August 1957 when Independence was achieved under the Merdeka Agreement, to which Sambanthan was a signatory.

== Background ==
Sambanthan was born in Sungai Siput in 1919. His father, M.S. Veerasamy, came to Malaya in the year 1896, was a pioneer rubber planter in Sungai Siput, Perak and owned several rubber plantations. His siblings are V. Meenachi Sundram, V. Krishnan and V. Saraswathy.

Sambanthan received his early education at Clifford High School in Kuala Kangsar, Perak. A keen sportsman, Sambanthan was an intelligent student who loved to chat and joke.

== Political career ==
=== Early Involvement ===
Sambanthan, with the intention of creating a more cohesive and unified Indian community, organised the Perak United Indian Council in 1953, the same year he was elected Perak MIC chairman.

However, the event that helped catapult Sambanthan to the forefront of MIC politics was a visit by Vijaya Lakshmi Pandit, the younger sister of the then Indian prime minister Pandit Jawaharlal Nehru. Sambanthan had befriended her when he was involved with the Indian National Congress while studying at Annamalai University.

On his invitation, she visited Malaya in 1954 and despite the ongoing communist insurgency, visited Sungai Siput where she officially opened the Mahatma Gandhi Tamil School. The meeting between Sambanthan and Vijaya Lakshmi in 1954 helped push the former into the limelight and then on to the party president's position in 1955.

In the same year, he was elected member of the legislative council for the Kinta Utara constituency. The constituency was renamed in 1959 as the Sungai Siput seat.

=== Becoming MIC President ===
In the post World War II period, the Indian professional elite was largely held together by the unifying ideology of Indian nationalism. In 1946, the Indian of other ethnicity in Malaya formed the MIC. For the first eight years, the MIC leaders were either North Indian or Malayalee, representing a minority among the Indians. The majority of Indians (90%) in Malaya at that time were South Indians, mainly from the labouring class.

The Emergency (declared by the British in 1948 to battle communist insurgency) regulations and new trade union legislation also led to the leadership of the trade union movement passing from the Chinese, who were much better organised, to the Indians. This dilution of the MIC's objectives affected the status of Indian plantation workers in the Malaysian economy then and its repercussions are still being felt today.

In 1954, there were serious debates within the MIC as to whether the partys should join the UMNO-MCA Alliance that was emerging as the leading political movement in the country, following their successes in local elections. The MIC had aligned itself with Datuk Onn Jaafar's Independence of Malaya Party and later Party Negara, and there was a rethink within the MIC leadership during this period.

According to Rajeswary Ampalavanar, author of The Indian Minority and Political Change in Malaya 1954–1957, the MIC leadership was quite eager to join the Alliance but there was some resistance within the party's broader membership. They were willing to support the move if the party could secure some concessions from the Alliance on inter-communal issues, particularly on education.

Then MIC president K.L. Devaser came under heavy criticism from the Tamil media for not addressing the pressing issues facing the community. While he was quite outspoken, his influence was largely among the urban-based Indian elite and he lacked wider grassroots support.

Some in the party felt that there was a need for a leader with a stronger relationship with the party's grassroots. In March 1955, reports in the local daily Tamil Murasu urged Tamils to boycott the MIC.

Sambanthan, then a state MIC leader, emerged during this period as an alternative candidate for the party leadership. Going by historical records, he was literally coerced into taking up the presidency. Another candidate, P.P. Narayanan, was approached by party leaders but turned down their invitation because he wanted to concentrate on union activities.

Sambanthan initially declined but following some pressure from the Tamil leaders agreed to take on the party leadership. He was duly elected the fifth president of the MIC in May 1955. Sambanthan was also acceptable to the Malay leadership because he played down political (and to some extent, economic) rights in favour of cultural and language rights.

=== Becoming a Tamil party ===
The MIC's main challenge was to reconcile the political aspirations of the middle class with the poverty and needs of the labouring class, who in 1938 comprised 84% of the plantation labour force. Sambanthan started a recruitment campaign among plantation workers, relying on patronage of Hinduism in its popular South Indian form, increased use and fostering of the Tamil language, and Tamil cultural activities.

But the MIC under Sambanthan failed to reconcile the needs of labour with the political aspirations of the middle class. The traditionalists and the lower middle class strengthened their hold within the party, while the upper class professionals and the intelligentsia moved away from it. Subsequently, two paths to leadership emerged among the Indians – political and trade union – with very little interaction between them.

Under Sambanthan's leadership, the MIC effectively became a Tamil party. Sambanthan served as president of the MIC from 1955 to 1971 and was largely responsible for the transformation of the party from an active, political organisation to a conservative, traditional one, emphasising Indian culture, religion and language.

It was also the weakest of the three main political parties. It had the smallest electorate – 7.4% in 1959; and it had little support from the Indian community at large.

Since the Indian community was geographically dispersed and divided, it comprised less than 25% in any constituency. Therefore, the MIC's over-riding concern was to remain a partner in the Alliance (the UMNO-MCA-MIC Alliance that had won the first elections in 1955, and that was subsequently renamed Barisan Nasional) and obtain whatever concessions it could from the dominant UMNO. In the process, political and economic rights of workers were sacrificed.

Sambanthan, while as MIC president, helped strengthen the party economically by selling about half of his father's 2.4 km^{2} rubber estate to help the Indian community as well as to provide financial strength to the party coffers.

Sambanthan took over the mantle of the MIC during a period of turmoil in the party in 1955, barely months before the first federal elections, and over time strengthen the party and consolidated its position in the coalition. He did not always please his members, but was able to gradually unite a party that had considerable internal splits.

=== First federal elections ===
The year 1955 was a milestone for Malaya's advance towards self-governance. The British colonial administration had agreed to hold the first federal elections in July 1955 and Sambanthan was instantly thrown into the cauldron of electoral politics.

He met the new challenge and following negotiations with the Alliance leaders the MIC was allocated two seats – in Batu Pahat, Johor, and Sungai Siput, Perak. Sambanthan Thevar contested the Sungai Siput seat and won comfortably.

The Alliance swept 51 of the 52 seats, the exception being a seat in Perak. Following the election win, Sambanthan was appointed to the Cabinet and sworn in as Labour Minister in the Alliance government.

The coalition decided to push for a quicker transfer of power and an Alliance delegation went to London in January 1956 to hold talks on a range of issues, including independence, with Secretary of State Alan Lennox-Boyd.

=== Merdeka negotiations ===
Earlier, in 1956, Sambanthan led the MIC delegation in the negotiations between the Alliance parties in drawing up a memorandum to be presented to the Reid Commission.

Sambanthan was a pragmatic negotiator and worked hard to secure the interests of the Indian community, while at the same time being sensitive to the broader interests of the Alliance party's diverse membership.

He was at times criticised by his party members for conceding on certain issues, but Sambanthan was faced with the need to find a suitable balance to the various sectoral demands and sought to take a middle path in the negotiations. For taking such as position, he was praised by the Tunku.

The final constitutional negotiations in London in May 1957 also saw a personal transformation in Sambanthan. While in London for the constitutional talks, Tunku Abdul Rahman decided that Sambanthan needed new attire.

Sambanthan had caused some controversy when he wore a dhoti upon being elected into the Federal Legislative Council – a practice deemed taboo during the British period. But Sambanthan defended his choice, arguing: “It makes the average man feel happier.” Even after the elections in 1955, when he was appointed Minister of Labour, his traditional Indian attire remained intact.

Thus when in London, Tunku decided that something must be done. As the Tunku describes in his book Looking Back: “When walking with me in London, he was always trailing behind because he could not step out far enough to keep pace with me; or perhaps I walked faster on purpose. One day when we were out for a walk, I led him into Simpson’s men’s store in Piccadilly. On reaching there, I said: ‘Come in; I want to choose a new suit’, so he followed me inside.

”I asked the tailor to fit Sambanthan with a good ready-made suit. He protested, but only briefly, accepting the inevitability, and came out a new man in a new suit – West-End tailored, new shirt, new tie, new shoes and socks.”

The Tunku noted that after that incident, Sambanthan was not satisfied with just one suit and secretly went out to buy several more.

During the debate on the draft Constitution at the Federal Legislative Council on 10 July 1957, Sambanthan urged greater co-operation between the communities, reminding them that Malaya was a plural society. He told the council:

We belong to a plural society, and we should always remember that in such a society we have to recognise that psychology has its own place. It is not enough if one's own attitude towards a problem is good. It is necessary that he should see what reaction, what effect it would have on members of different communities.

=== Working with the Tunku ===
The MIC's success in the early years was due to the close personal friendship between Malaysia's first prime minister, Tunku Abdul Rahman Putra Al-Haj, and Sambanthan. For his part, Sambanthan ran the MIC as a largely informal party, in deference to UMNO, rather than as a political party with definite programmes.

In effect, it became a vehicle for distributing patronage (senate and legislative votes, nominations for decorations and awards, licences) to supporters, furnishing the Indian Malaysian vote, and an instrument for the leadership to entrench its role. But patronage was always in short supply and, eventually, rising dissatisfaction with Sambanthan led to a prolonged leadership crisis in the party.

=== Working with Tun Abdul Razak ===
When Tun Abdul Razak Hussein succeeded Tunku Abdul Rahman as Malaysia's prime minister, the MIC was forced to become much more responsive to the dictates of UMNO. This was following the May 13 Incident and Razak was more assertive than the Tunku to demonstrate Malay Supremacy or Ketuanan Melayu.

Sambanthan, by now bearing the title "Tun", was forced to retire in favour of V. Manickavasagam in 1973. This intervention is an indication of the inertia that had gripped the MIC following Sambanthan's rise to leadership in 1955.

== Ministerial posts ==
As president of a party that was a component of the ruling Alliance Party, he was appointed Minister of Labour (1955–57), Health (1957–59), Works, Posts and Telecommunications (1959–71) and National Unity (1972–74).

During the time the Malaysian Government decided to ban the Chinese lion dance and racial tension was high after 13 May 1969, Tun Sambanthan as National Unity Minister in the early 1970s, took some Chinese leaders to Genting to talk things over. The discussions were successful and the lion dance ban was later lifted because the Government realised it was important to maintain each race's culture.

Apart from ministerial duties, Tunku Abdul Rahman often assigned important tasks to Sambanthan. In 1968, the Tunku sent Sambanthan to Fiji as an emissary of peace; the Chief Minister of Fiji acknowledged Sambanthan's contribution in a letter to Tunku thanking him for the "great success" of the delegation "under the superb leadership of Tun Sambanthan".

Sambanthan also joined the delegation to Jakarta, Indonesia in 1966 to witness the signing of an agreement whereby diplomatic relations between Indonesia and Malaysia were normalised after the Indonesian Confrontation episode.

V. T. Sambanthan was also acting prime minister for one day when both the prime minister and his deputy were out of the country at the same time.

After resigning as president of MIC, he was appointed chairman of the National Unity Board (1974–78) that replaced the National Unity Ministry.

Throughout his political career, which spanned 25 years, he had preached and practised the doctrine of unity amidst diversity. Appropriately enough, in the Malaysian context, it was to national unity that he devoted the last few years of his life.

== Contributions ==
In his own way, Sambanthan instituted some reforms among Indian plantation workers. For example, he promoted education and thrift among Indian workers, lobbied for the introduction of English language instruction in Tamil schools in Perak and for the transformation of the South Indian Immigration Labour Fund into an education fund for the children of plantation workers.

The greatest challenge that MIC faced during his presidency was the fragmentation of estates, the livelihood of almost all Indian workers. In a bid to help the fragmentation, the party sponsored cooperative efforts to acquire estates and prevent displacement of the workers.

In 1960 Tun V.T. Sambanthan touted the idea of a social co-operative to help plantation workers during the British land sell off. Tun Sambanthan and K. R. Somasundram worked closely to purchase their first estate at Bukit Sidim in that same year. The co-operative was later called National Land and Finance Co-operative Society (NLFCS).

He toured rubber plantations to persuade workers to buy shares in the cooperative; a worker with a registration fee of $2 and a share costing $100 (payable in instalments) could buy a stake in a plantation.

At the time of his death in 1979, the cooperative had bought over 18 estates, totalling 120 km^{2} and had a membership of 85,000 workers. The Malayan Plantation Agencies administered the estates on behalf of the cooperative.

His wife, Toh Puan Umasundari Sambanthan served as chairman and director of the National Land Finance Co-operative Society (NLFC) from 1980 to 1995 and its president in 1995 and 1996.

K. R. Somasundram has since taken over the Chairmanship of the company upon the death of Tun Sambanthan and is still actively involved in the co-operative. Today NLFCS has 19 estates totalling 35,000 acres (142 km^{2}), as well as investments in Palm Oil, Property and Banking.

== Family ==
Tun Sambanthan was married to Toh Puan Umasundari Sambanthan. The couple's daughter, Deva Kunjari, is a lawyer.

== Honours ==
=== Honours of Malaysia ===
- Malaya
  - Commander of the Order of the Defender of the Realm (PMN) – Tan Sri (1959)
- Malaysia
  - Recipient of the Malaysian Commemorative Medal (Gold) (PPM) (1965)
  - Grand Commander of the Order of Loyalty to the Crown of Malaysia (SSM) – Tun (1967)

=== Places named after him ===
Several places were named after him, including:

- Jalan Tun Sambanthan (formerly Jalan Brickfields) in Kuala Lumpur
- Wisma Tun Sambanthan in Kuala Lumpur
- Tun Sambanthan Monorail station
- SJK(T) Tun Sambanthan, One of the component schools within the Sekolah Wawasan in Subang Jaya
- SJK(T) Tun Sambanthan in Bidor
