= Sungai Siput (federal constituency) =

Federal constituency in Perak, Malaysia

Sungai Siput (P062)
Perak constituency

Federal constituency
- Legislature: Dewan Rakyat
- MP: Kesavan Subramaniam; PH
- Constituency created: 1958
- First contested: 1959
- Last contested: 2022

Demographics
- Population (2020): 86,815
- Electors (2022): 72,395
- Area (km²): 1,850
- Pop. density (per km²): 46.9

Sungai Siput is a federal constituency in Kuala Kangsar District and Hulu Perak District, Perak, Malaysia, that has been represented in the Dewan Rakyat since 1959.

The federal constituency was created in the 1958 redistribution and is mandated to return a single member to the Dewan Rakyat under the first past the post voting system.

This seat was formerly a stronghold for the Malaysian Indian Congress during the presidency of Tun Sambanthan and Tun Samy Vellu. MIC lost this seat in the 2008 general election and has since failed to regain the seat. MIC has previously represented this seat since its creation.

== Demographics ==
Ethnic breakdown of Sungai Siput's electorate as of 2022
1. Chinese (34.5%)
2. Malay (34.2%)
3. Indian (21.2%)
4. Other ethnicities (10.1%)

As of 2020, Sungai Siput has a population of 86,815 people.

Age breakdown of Sungai Siput's electorate as of 2022
1. 18–20 (5.60%)
2. 21–29 (19.4%)
3. 30–39 (20.5%)
4. 40–49 (17.9%)
5. 50–59 (15.7%)
6. 60–69 (11.8%)
7. 70–79 (6.21%)
8. 80–89 (2.38%)
9. above 90 (0.44%)
Gender breakdown of Sungai Siput's electorate as of 2022
1. Male (50.0%)
2. Female (50.0%)

== History ==
=== Polling districts ===
According to the gazette issued on 31 October 2022, the Sungai Siput constituency has a total of 38 polling districts.

State constituency	Polling Districts	Code	Location
Lintang（N21）	Kampong Kandang Hulu	062/21/01	SK Kota Lama Kanan
Lintang（N21）	Kampong Batang Kulim	062/21/02	SK Kota Lama Kanan
Lintang（N21）	Salak North	062/21/03	SK Setia Jaya
Lintang（N21）	Kampong Enggor	062/21/04	SJK (T) Enggor
Lintang（N21）	Karai Luar	062/21/05	SJK (C) Sey Wah
Lintang（N21）	Pekan Karai	062/21/06	SJK (C) Sey Wah
Lintang（N21）	Kampong Karai	062/21/07	SK Karai
Lintang（N21）	Kampong Jawang	062/21/08	SK Jawang
Lintang（N21）	Changkat Salak	062/21/09	SJK (T) Ladang Changkat Salak
Lintang（N21）	Salak Timor	062/21/10	SJK (C) Salak Bahru
Lintang（N21）	Kamuning Barat	062/21/11	SJK (C) Shing Chung
Lintang（N21）	Kamuning Timor	062/21/12	SJK (C) Shing Chung
Lintang（N21）	Kampong Temin	062/21/13	SK Temin
Lintang（N21）	Sungai Pelus	062/21/14	SK Trosor
Lintang（N21）	Trosor	062/21/15	SK Seroli
Lintang（N21）	Kampong Mor	062/21/16	SK Kampong Maamor
Lintang（N21）	LKTP Lasah	062/21/17	SMK RLKT Lasah
Lintang（N21）	Lintang	062/21/18	SK Lintang
Lintang（N21）	Ladang Elphil	062/21/19	SJK (T) Ladang Elphil
Lintang（N21）	Rancangan Belia Khas Berlop	062/21/20	SJK (C) Lasah
Lintang（N21）	Chior Lasah	062/21/21	SK Lasah
Lintang（N21）	Chenin	062/21/22	SK Chenin
Lintang（N21）	Pos Piah	062/21/23	SK Pos Piah
Lintang（N21）	Pos Perwor	062/21/24	SK Pos Perwor
Lintang（N21）	Pos Legap	062/21/25	SK Pos Legap
Lintang（N21）	Pos Kuala Mu	062/21/26	SK Pos Kuala Mu
Jalong（N22）	Jalong Timor	062/22/01	SK Jalong
Jalong（N22）	Jalong Barat	062/22/02	SJK (C) Simpang Jalong
Jalong（N22）	Jalan Lintang	062/22/03	SK Kampung Muhibbah
Jalong（N22）	Lintang Road Barat	062/22/04	SJK (T) Mahathma Gandhi Kalasalai
Jalong（N22）	Kampong Bahagia	062/22/05	SMK Methodist; SRA Rakyat Ijtihadiah
Jalong（N22）	Rimba Panjang Utara	062/22/06	SJK (C) Rimba Panjang
Jalong（N22）	Kampong Muhibbah	062/22/07	SMK Toh Muda Abdul Aziz Sungai Siput (U)
Jalong（N22）	Simpang Tiga	062/22/08	SMJK Shing Chung
Jalong（N22）	Main Road	062/22/09	SK Sungai Siput (U)
Jalong（N22）	Mahkamah	062/22/10	SJK (C) Sungai Buloh
Jalong（N22）	Sungai Buloh Selatan	062/22/11	SJK (C) Sungai Buloh
Jalong（N22）	Sungai Pelang	062/22/12	SJK (T) Ladang Dovenby

=== Representation history ===
Members of Parliament for Sungai Siput
Parliament	No	Years	Member	Party	Vote Share
Constituency created from Kinta Utara
Sungei Siput
Parliament of the Federation of Malaya
1st	P046	1959–1963	V. T. Sambanthan (வீ. தி. சம்பந்தன்)	Alliance (MIC)	7,317; 61.08
Parliament of Malaysia
1st	P046	1963–1964	V. T. Sambanthan (வீ. தி. சம்பந்தன்)	Alliance (MIC)	7,317; 61.08
2nd	P046	1964–1969	V. T. Sambanthan (வீ. தி. சம்பந்தன்)	Alliance (MIC)	9,855; 71.53%
		1969–1971	Parliament was suspended		
3rd	P046	1971–1973	V. T. Sambanthan (வீ. தி. சம்பந்தன்)	Alliance (MIC)	7,985; 50.46%
3rd	P046	1973–1974	V. T. Sambanthan (வீ. தி. சம்பந்தன்)	BN (MIC)	7,985; 50.46%
4th	P048	1974–1978	Samy Vellu (ச. சாமிவேலு)	BN (MIC)	9,045; 49.09%
5th	P048	1978–1982	Samy Vellu (ச. சாமிவேலு)	BN (MIC)	12,930; 62.41%
6th	P048	1982–1986	Samy Vellu (ச. சாமிவேலு)	BN (MIC)	14,930; 64.56%
Sungai Siput
7th	P056	1986–1990	Samy Vellu (ச. சாமிவேலு)	BN (MIC)	13,148; 56.05%
8th	P056	1990–1995	Samy Vellu (ச. சாமிவேலு)	BN (MIC)	14,427; 53.25%
9th	P059	1995–1999	Samy Vellu (ச. சாமிவேலு)	BN (MIC)	21,283; 71.86%
10th	P059	1999–2004	Samy Vellu (ச. சாமிவேலு)	BN (MIC)	17,480; 57.75%
11th	P062	2004–2008	Samy Vellu (ச. சாமிவேலு)	BN (MIC)	19,029; 62.19%
12th	P062	2008–2013	Michael Jeyakumar Devaraj (மைக்கல் ஜெயகுமார்)	PSM	16,458; 51.50%
13th	P062	2013–2018	Michael Jeyakumar Devaraj (மைக்கல் ஜெயகுமார்)	PSM	21,593; 53.19%
14th	P062	2018–2022	Kesavan Subramaniam (கேசவன் சுப்ரமணியம்)	PH (PKR)	20,817; 48.72%
15th	P062	2022–present	Kesavan Subramaniam (கேசவன் சுப்ரமணியம்)	PH (PKR)	21,637; 41.77%

=== State constituency ===
Parliamentary constituency	State constituency						
Parliamentary constituency	1955–1959*	1959–1974	1974–1986	1986–1995	1995–2004	2004–2018	2018–present
Sungai Siput				Jalong			
Sungai Siput				Lintang			
Sungei Siput		Jalong					
Sungei Siput		Karai					
Sungei Siput			Lintang				

=== Historical boundaries ===
State Constituency	Area					
State Constituency	1959	1974	1984	1994	2003	2018
Jalong	Jalong; Kampung Orang Asli Lawai; Rimba Panjang; Sungai Siput; Taman Seri Taman					
Karai	Enggor; Kampung Perlop; Karai; Kota Lama Kanan; Lintang					
Lintang		Enggor; Kampung Perlop; Karai; Kota Lama Kanan; Lintang				Enggor; Kampung Perlop; Kota Lama Kanan; Lintang; Pos Piah

=== Current state assembly members ===
No.	State Constituency	Member	Coalition (Party)
N21	Lintang	Mohd Zolkafly Harun	BN (UMNO)
N22	Jalong	Loh Sze Yee	PH (DAP)

=== Local governments & postcodes ===
No.	State Constituency	Local Government	Postcode
N21	Lintang	Kuala Kangsar Municipal Council; Lenggong District Council (Pos Piah area)	31050, 31100 Sungai Siput; 33040 Kuala Kangsar; 33500 Sauk
N22	Jalong	Kuala Kangsar Municipal Council	31050, 31100 Sungai Siput; 33040 Kuala Kangsar; 33500 Sauk

== Election results ==
Malaysian general election, 2022
Party	Candidate	Votes	%	∆%
PH	Kesavan Subramaniam	21,637	41.77	▲41.77
BN	Vigneswaran Sanasee	19,791	38.21	▲2.61
PN	Irudhanathan Gabriel	8,190	15.81	▲15.81
PEJUANG	Ahmad Fauzi Mohd Jaafar	784	1.51	▲1.51
Independent	R. Indrani	767	1.48	▲1.48
Independent	Baharudin Kamarudin	598	1.15	▲1.15
Independent	Rajah Narasaim	35	0.07	▲0.07
Total valid votes		51,802	100.00	
Total rejected ballots		991		
Unreturned ballots		85		
Turnout		52,725	71.34	▼8.04
Registered electors		72,395		
Majority		1,846	2.55	▼10.57
PH hold		Swing		
Source(s) https://lom.agc.gov.my/ilims/upload/portal/akta/outputp/1753277/PUB610%20PARLIMEN%20PERAK.pdf

Malaysian general election, 2018
Party	Candidate	Votes	%	∆%
PKR	Kesavan Subramaniam	20,817	48.72	▼4.47
BN	Devamany S. Krishnasamy	15,210	35.60	▼10.72
PAS	Ishak Ibrahim	5,194	12.16	▲12.16
Parti Sosialis Malaysia	Michael Jeyakumar Devaraj	1,505	3.52	▲3.52
Total valid votes		42,726	100.00	
Total rejected ballots		814		
Unreturned ballots		122		
Turnout		43,662	79.38	▼1.28
Registered electors		55,002		
Majority		5,607	13.12	▲6.25
PKR hold		Swing		
Source(s) "His Majesty's Government Gazette - Notice of Contested Election, Parliament for the State of Perak [P.U. (B) 237/2018]" (PDF). Attorney General's Chambers of Malaysia. 3 May 2018. "Federal Government Gazette - Results of Contested Election and Statements of the Poll after the Official Addition of Votes, Parliamentary Constituencies for the State of Perak [P.U. (B) 311/2018]" (PDF). Attorney General's Chambers of Malaysia. 28 May 2018.

Malaysian general election, 2013
Party	Candidate	Votes	%	∆%
PKR	Michael Jeyakumar Devaraj	21,593	53.19	▲1.69
BN	Devamany S. Krishnasamy	18,800	46.32	▲0.52
Independent	Nagalingam Singaravelloo	197	0.49	▲0.49
Total valid votes		40,590	100.00	
Total rejected ballots		982		
Unreturned ballots		45		
Turnout		41,617	80.66	▲10.75
Registered electors		51,596		
Majority		2,793	6.87	▲1.17
PKR hold		Swing		
Source(s) "Federal Government Gazette - Notice of Contested Election, Parliament for the State of Perak [P.U. (B) 174/2013]" (PDF). Attorney General's Chambers of Malaysia. 26 April 2013. "Federal Government Gazette - Results of Contested Election and Statements of the Poll after the Official Addition of Votes, Parliamentary Constituencies for the State of Perak [P.U. (B) 215/2013]" (PDF). Attorney General's Chambers of Malaysia. 22 May 2013.

Malaysian general election, 2008
Party	Candidate	Votes	%	∆%
PKR	Michael Jeyakumar Devaraj	16,458	51.50	▲23.13
BN	Samy Vellu Sangalimuthu	14,637	45.80	▼16.39
Independent	Nor Rizan Oon	864	2.70	▲2.70
Total valid votes		31,959	100.00	
Total rejected ballots		1,001		
Unreturned ballots		194		
Turnout		33,154	69.91	▲2.40
Registered electors		47,424		
Majority		1,821	5.70	▼28.12
PKR gain from BN		Swing		?

Malaysian general election, 2004
Party	Candidate	Votes	%	∆%
BN	Samy Vellu Sangalimuthu	19,029	62.19	▲4.44
PKR	Michael Jeyakumar Devaraj	8,680	28.37	▲28.37
DAP	Sanmugam Ponmugam Ponnan	2,890	9.44	▼30.94
Total valid votes		30,599	100.00	
Total rejected ballots		927		
Unreturned ballots		57		
Turnout		31,583	67.51	▲3.89
Registered electors		46,782		
Majority		10,349	33.82	▲16.45
BN hold		Swing		

Malaysian general election, 1999
Party	Candidate	Votes	%	∆%
BN	Samy Vellu Sangalimuthu	17,480	57.75	▼14.11
DAP	Michael Jeyakumar Devaraj	12,221	40.38	▲21.23
MDP	Mohamad Asri Othman	565	1.87	▲1.87
Total valid votes		30,266	100.00	
Total rejected ballots		829		
Unreturned ballots		70		
Turnout		31,165	63.62	▼4.04
Registered electors		48,986		
Majority		5,259	17.37	▼35.34
BN hold		Swing		

Malaysian general election, 1995
Party	Candidate	Votes	%	∆%
BN	Samy Vellu Sangalimuthu	21,283	71.86	▲18.61
DAP	Lim Ah Guan @ Lim Soon Guan	5,673	19.15	▼27.60
PAS	Mohamed Hashim Salim	2,663	8.99	▲8.99
Total valid votes		29,619	100.00	
Total rejected ballots		842		
Unreturned ballots		91		
Turnout		30,552	67.66	▼1.55
Registered electors		45,155		
Majority		15,610	52.71	▲46.21
BN hold		Swing		

Malaysian general election, 1990
Party	Candidate	Votes	%	∆%
BN	Samy Vellu Sangalimuthu	14,427	53.25	▼2.80
DAP	Patto Perumal	12,664	46.75	▲9.61
Total valid votes		27,091	100.00	
Total rejected ballots		937		
Unreturned ballots		0		
Turnout		28,028	69.21	▼0.11
Registered electors		40,499		
Majority		1,763	6.50	▼12.41
BN hold		Swing		

Malaysian general election, 1986
Party	Candidate	Votes	%	∆%
BN	Samy Vellu Sangalimuthu	13,148	56.05	▼8.51
DAP	Liew Sam Fong	8,712	37.14	▲6.73
SDP	Wan Hassan Wan Mahmud	1,597	6.81	▲6.81
Total valid votes		23,457	100.00	
Total rejected ballots		1,109		
Unreturned ballots		0		
Turnout		24,566	69.32	▼4.31
Registered electors		35,441		
Majority		4,436	18.91	▼15.24
BN hold		Swing		

Malaysian general election, 1982: Sungei Siput
Party	Candidate	Votes	%	∆%
BN	Samy Vellu Sangalimuthu	14,930	64.56	▲2.15
DAP	T. Sellapan	7,033	30.41	▼7.18
PAS	Ahmad Zawawi Ibrahim	1,164	5.03	▲5.03
Total valid votes		23,127	100.00	
Total rejected ballots		700		
Unreturned ballots		0		
Turnout		23,827	73.63	▼3.16
Registered electors		32,360		
Majority		7,897	34.15	▲9.33
BN hold		Swing		

Malaysian general election, 1978: Sungei Siput
Party	Candidate	Votes	%	∆%
BN	Samy Vellu Sangalimuthu	12,930	62.41	▲13.32
DAP	Ngan Siong Hing @ Ngan Siong Eng	7,789	37.59	▲8.00
Total valid votes		20,719	100.00	
Total rejected ballots		721		
Unreturned ballots		0		
Turnout		21,440	76.79	▼1.08
Registered electors		27,922		
Majority		5,141	24.82	▲21.32
BN hold		Swing		

Malaysian general election, 1974: Sungei Siput
Party	Candidate	Votes	%	∆%
BN	Samy Vellu Sangalimuthu	9,045	49.09	▲49.09
DAP	Patto Perumal	8,401	45.59	▲45.59
PEKEMAS	Thang Pang Fay	877	4.76	▲4.76
Independent	R. C. Manavarayan	103	0.56	▲0.56
Total valid votes		18,426	100.00	
Total rejected ballots		103		
Unreturned ballots		0		
Turnout		18,529	77.87	▲1.75
Registered electors		23,795		
Majority		644	3.50	▲2.58
BN gain from Alliance		Swing		?

Malaysian general election, 1969: Sungei Siput
Party	Candidate	Votes	%	∆%
Alliance	V. T. Sambanthan	7,985	50.46	▼21.07
PPP	Ramiah Veerappan	7,839	49.54	▲21.07
Total valid votes		15,824	100.00	
Total rejected ballots		695		
Unreturned ballots		0		
Turnout		16,519	76.12	▼4.91
Registered electors		21,702		
Majority		146	0.92	▼42.14
Alliance hold		Swing		

Malaysian general election, 1964: Sungei Siput
Party	Candidate	Votes	%	∆%
Alliance	V. T. Sambanthan	9,855	71.53	▲10.45
PPP	Ramiah Veerappan	3,922	28.47	▼28.47
Total valid votes		13,777	100.00	
Total rejected ballots		639		
Unreturned ballots		0		
Turnout		14,416	81.03	▲10.72
Registered electors		17,791		
Majority		5,933	43.06	▼27.25
Alliance hold		Swing		

Malayan general election, 1959: Sungei Siput
Party	Candidate	Votes	%
Alliance	V. T. Sambanthan	7,317	61.08
PPP	K. Annamalai	4,514	37.68
Independent	Choy Kok Kuan	148	1.24
Total valid votes		11,979	100.00
Total rejected ballots		96	
Unreturned ballots		0	
Turnout		12,075	70.31
Registered electors		17,175	
Majority		2,803	23.40
This was a new constituency created.
