= T Devaraj =

Malaysian medical doctor

Thamboo Pragasam Devaraj better known as Dr T Devaraj (born June 21, 1924) is a Malaysian medical doctor. A former president of the Malaysian Medical Association, he played a pioneering role in the development of palliative care in Malaysia.

He was awarded the Caring Physicians of the World award in 2005 by the World Medical Association.

He is the father of former two-term MP Michael Jeyakumar Devaraj. He is also the father-in-law of former minister Xavier Jayakumar.

== Early life ==
Born in Penang on June 21, 1924, Devaraj obtained an MBBS from the Universiti Malaya (then based in Singapore) in 1952. He started his career as a medical officer with the Ministry of Health, Singapore (1952–1954), and subsequently served with the Ministry of Health, Malaya as a medical officer in Johor. He became a consultant physician in 1959 serving until 1979 in Kuantan and Alor Setar. He was then appointed Honorary Consultant Physician at the Penang Adventist Hospital where he served until 1991.

In 1992, he helped launch the hospice movement in Penang and was appointed Vice Chairman of the Penang Hospice Society in 2001. He was an elected member of the Malaysian Medical Council (MMC) from 1979 to 2000. His roles include being president of the Malaysian Medical Association in 1983, Chairman of the National Cancer Society of Malaysia (NCSM), Penang Branch, Chairman of the Malaysian Hospice Council and Chancellor of the International Medical University (2011–2013).

He dedicated his career to providing free, compassionate care for terminal patients, earning numerous awards for his advocacy in pain management and ethical medical practice.

== Family ==
His wife Elizabeth was President of the National YWCA for three terms (1990–1996) and co-founded the Women's Centre for Change (earlier known as Women's Crisis Centre). The couple married in 1953 and Elizabeth died on March 17, 2017.

His daughter Prema Devaraj served as president of the human rights organisation Aliran from 2016 to 2019, while another daughter Sheila Christine Devaraj is a researcher and academic whose work focuses on child development, particularly dyslexia. Sheila is married to Xavier Jayakumar who served as Minister of Water, Land and Natural Resources from July 2018 to February 2020.

His son Michael Jeyakumar Devaraj is a medical doctor and politician who is chairperson of Socialist Party of Malaysia and served as Sungai Siput MP from 2008 to 2018.
