= Samy Vellu =

Malaysian politician (1936–2022)

Yang Amat Berbahagia Tun Samy Vellu SSM SUMW SSAP SPMP SPMJ PNBS DPMS PCM AMN RIBA
- ச. சாமிவேலு
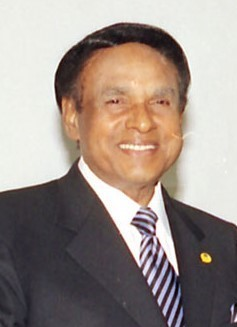
- Samy Vellu in 2004

Minister of Works (Note: Minister of Works and Public Amenities (1979–1983))
- In office 8 May 1995 – 18 March 2008
- Monarchs: Ja'afar; Salahuddin; Sirajuddin; Mizan Zainal Abidin
- Prime Minister: Mahathir Mohamad (1995–2003); Abdullah Ahmad Badawi (2003–2008)
- Deputy: Railey Jeffrey (1995–1999); Mohamed Khaled Nordin (1999–2004); Mohd Zin Mohamed (2004–2008)
- Preceded by: Leo Moggie Irok
- Succeeded by: Mohd Zin Mohamed
- Constituency: Sungai Siput
- In office 15 September 1979 – 15 June 1989
- Monarchs: Ahmad Shah; Iskandar; Azlan Shah
- Prime Minister: Mahathir Mohamad
- Deputy: Clarence E. Mansul (1979–1981); Nik Hussein Wan Abdul Rahman (1981–1983); Zainal Abidin Zin (1983–1986); Mustaffa Mohammad (1986–1987); Luhat Wan (1987–1989)
- Preceded by: Lee San Choon
- Succeeded by: Leo Moggie Irok
- Constituency: Sungai Siput

Minister of Energy, Telecommunications and Posts
- In office 15 June 1989 – 7 May 1995
- Monarchs: Azlan Shah; Ja'afar
- Prime Minister: Mahathir Mohamad
- Deputy: Abdul Ghani Othman (1989–1990); Tajol Rosli Mohd Ghazali (1990–1995)
- Preceded by: Leo Moggie Irok
- Succeeded by: Leo Moggie Irok as Minister of Energy, Communications and Multimedia
- Constituency: Sungai Siput

7th President of the Malaysian Indian Congress
- In office 12 October 1979 – 6 December 2010
- Deputy: Subramaniam Sinniah (1979–2006); Palanivel Govindasamy (2006–2010)
- Preceded by: V. Manickavasagam
- Succeeded by: Palanivel Govindasamy

Member of the Malaysian Parliament for Sungai Siput
- In office 16 September 1974 – 8 March 2008
- Preceded by: V. T. Sambanthan (BN–MIC)
- Succeeded by: Michael Jeyakumar Devaraj (PSM)
- Majority: 644 (1974); 5,141 (1978); 7,897 (1982); 4,436 (1986); 1,763 (1990); 15,610 (1995); 5,259 (1999); 10,349 (2004)

Faction represented in Dewan Rakyat
- 1974–2008: Barisan Nasional

Personal details
- Born: Samy Vellu s/o Sangalimuthu; 8 March 1936 Kluang, Johor, British Malaya (now Malaysia)
- Died: 15 September 2022 (aged 86) Kuala Lumpur, Malaysia
- Citizenship: Malaysian
- Party: Malaysian Indian Congress (MIC)
- Other political affiliations: Barisan Nasional (BN)
- Spouse: Indrani Samy Vellu
- Children: Vell Paari Samy Vellu
- Occupation: Politician
- Profession: Architect

Samy Vellu s/o Sangalimuthu (Tamil: சாமிவேலு சங்கிலிமுத்து, romanized: Cāmivēlu Caṅkilimuttu; 8 March 1936 – 15 September 2022) was a Malaysian politician who served as Minister of Works from June 1983 to June 1989 and again from May 1995 to March 2008, Minister of Energy, Telecommunications and Posts from June 1989 to May 1995, Minister of Works and Public Amenities from September 1979 to June 1983 and Member of Parliament (MP) for Sungai Siput from September 1974 to March 2008. He was a member and served as 7th President of the Malaysian Indian Congress (MIC), a component party of the ruling Barisan Nasional (BN) coalition, from October 1979 to December 2010. He is the longest-serving MIC president having held the position for 31 years and one of the longest-serving Cabinet ministers at 29 years. In December 2010, he announced his retirement from politics, paving the way for then MIC Deputy President Palanivel Govindasamy to succeed him as the new party president.

Former MCA president Ling Liong Sik described Samy Vellu as a man of many talents and with a great sense of humour.

== Political career ==
Samy Vellu's political career began at the age of 23, in 1959, when he and Govindaraj joined the Batu Caves MIC branch. After five years, he was elected Selangor MIC committee member and the head of the party. He made headline news by climbing up the Indonesian embassy's flag pole, pulling down the flag and burning it. He was charged in court and fined RM2. He was called Hero Malaysia on the front pages.

He was a Member of Parliament for Sungai Siput constituency for eight terms from September 1974 to March 2008. During this time, from 1978 to 1979 he was Deputy Minister of Local Government and Housing. Then from 1979 to 1989 he was Minister of Works. He then served as Minister of Energy, Telecommunications and Posts from 1989 to 1995. From 1995 to March 2008 he was the Minister of Works until he lost his parliamentary seat to Michael Jeyakumar Devaraj of the Socialist Party of Malaysia (PSM) who contested on the ticket of the People's Justice Party (PKR) in the March 2008 general election.

He was the second longest serving minister in the country during his time, after Rafidah Aziz.

Samy Vellu was appointed Malaysia's Special Envoy of Infrastructure to India and Southern Asia, with ministerial rank, since 1 January 2011. The appointment was terminated by the new Pakatan Harapan (PH) government in 2018.

== Personal life ==
Vellu was born in Kluang, Johor, and was of Indian descent. He was married to Indrani Samy Vellu and had one son, Vell Paari. He was a chartered architect and a member of the Royal Institute of British Architects (RIBA) and of the Malaysian Institute of Architects.

== Biography ==
A Life. A Legend. A Legacy written by Bernice Narayanan reveals Samy Vellu's achievements and setbacks as well as "behind-the-scenes" events in his almost 50 years of active politics.

== Election results ==
Parliament of Malaysia
Year	Constituency	Candidate	Votes	Pct	Opponent(s)	Votes	Pct	Ballots cast	Majority	Turnout
1974	P048 Sungei Siput	Samy Vellu (MIC)	9,045	49.09%	Patto Perumal (DAP)	8,401	45.59%	18,529	644	77.87%
1974	P048 Sungei Siput	Samy Vellu (MIC)	9,045	49.09%	Thang Pang Fay (PEKEMAS)	877	4.76%	18,529	644	77.87%
1974	P048 Sungei Siput	Samy Vellu (MIC)	9,045	49.09%	RC Manavarayan (IND)	103	0.56%	18,529	644	77.87%
1978	P048 Sungei Siput	Samy Vellu (MIC)	12,930	62.41%	Ngan Siong Hing @ Ngan Siong Eng (DAP)	7,789	37.59%	21,440	5,141	76.79%
1982	P048 Sungei Siput	Samy Vellu (MIC)	14,930	64.56%	T. Sellapan (DAP)	7,033	30.41%	23,827	7,897	73.63%
1982	P048 Sungei Siput	Samy Vellu (MIC)	14,930	64.56%	Ahmad Zawawi Ibrahim (PAS)	1,164	5.03%	23,827	7,897	73.63%
1986	P056 Sungai Siput	Samy Vellu (MIC)	13,148	56.05%	Liew Sam Fong (DAP)	8,712	37.14%	24,566	4,436	69.32%
1986	P056 Sungai Siput	Samy Vellu (MIC)	13,148	56.05%	Wan Hassan Wan Mahmud (SDP)	1,597	6.81%	24,566	4,436	69.32%
1990	P056 Sungai Siput	Samy Vellu (MIC)	14,427	53.25%	Patto Perumal (DAP)	12,664	46.75%	28,028	1,763	69.21%
1995	P059 Sungai Siput	Samy Vellu (MIC)	21,283	71.86%	Lim Ah Guan @ Lim Soon Guan (DAP)	5,673	19.15%	30,552	15,610	67.66%
1995	P059 Sungai Siput	Samy Vellu (MIC)	21,283	71.86%	Mohamed Hashim Salim (PAS)	2,663	8.99%	30,552	15,610	67.66%
1999	P059 Sungai Siput	Samy Vellu (MIC)	17,480	57.75%	Michael Jeyakumar Devaraj (DAP)^{1}	12,221	40.38%	31,165	5,259	63.62%
1999	P059 Sungai Siput	Samy Vellu (MIC)	17,480	57.75%	Mohamad Asri Othman (MDP)	565	1.87%	31,165	5,259	63.62%
2004	P062 Sungai Siput	Samy Vellu (MIC)	19,029	62.19%	Michael Jeyakumar Devaraj (PKR)^{2}	8,680	28.37%	31,583	10,349	67.51%
2004	P062 Sungai Siput	Samy Vellu (MIC)	19,029	62.19%	Sanmugam Ponmugam Ponnan (DAP)	2,890	9.44%	31,583	10,349	67.51%
2008	P062 Sungai Siput	Samy Vellu (MIC)	14,637	44.15%	Michael Jeyakumar Devaraj (PKR)^{2}	16,458	49.64%	33,154	1,821	69.91%
2008	P062 Sungai Siput	Samy Vellu (MIC)	14,637	44.15%	Nor Rizan Oon (IND)	864	2.61%	33,154	1,821	69.91%

Note: ^{1} & ^{2} Michael Jeyakumar Devaraj amid contesting under the tickets of DAP in the 1999 election and PKR in the 2004 and 2008 elections, is a member of PSM.

== Honours ==
=== Honours of Malaysia ===
- Malaysia
  - Grand Commander of the Order of Loyalty to the Crown of Malaysia (SSM) – Tun (2017)
- Federal Territory (Malaysia)
  - Grand Knight of the Order of the Territorial Crown (SUMW) – Datuk Seri Utama (2013)
- Johor
  - Knight Grand Commander of the Order of the Crown of Johor (SPMJ) – Dato' (1980)
- Pahang
  - Knight Grand Companion of the Order of Sultan Ahmad Shah of Pahang (SSAP) – Dato' Sri (2004)
- Perak
  - Knight Grand Commander of the Order of the Perak State Crown (SPMP) – Dato' Seri (1989)
  - Commander of the Order of Cura Si Manja Kini (PCM) (1978)
- Sarawak
  - Knight Commander of the Most Exalted Order of the Star of Sarawak (PNBS) – Dato Sri (2003)
- Selangor
  - Knight Commander of the Order of the Crown of Selangor (DPMS) – Dato' (1979)

=== Places named after him ===
- Jalan Tun Dr S Samy Vellu, a stretch of the Ipoh–Butterworth trunk road in Sungai Siput

== Notes ==
Political offices
Preceded by V. Manickavasagam	Malaysian Indian Congress (MIC) President; 12 October 1979 – 6 December 2010	Succeeded by G. Palanivel
