= K. R. Somasundram =

Malaysian Indian (born 1930)

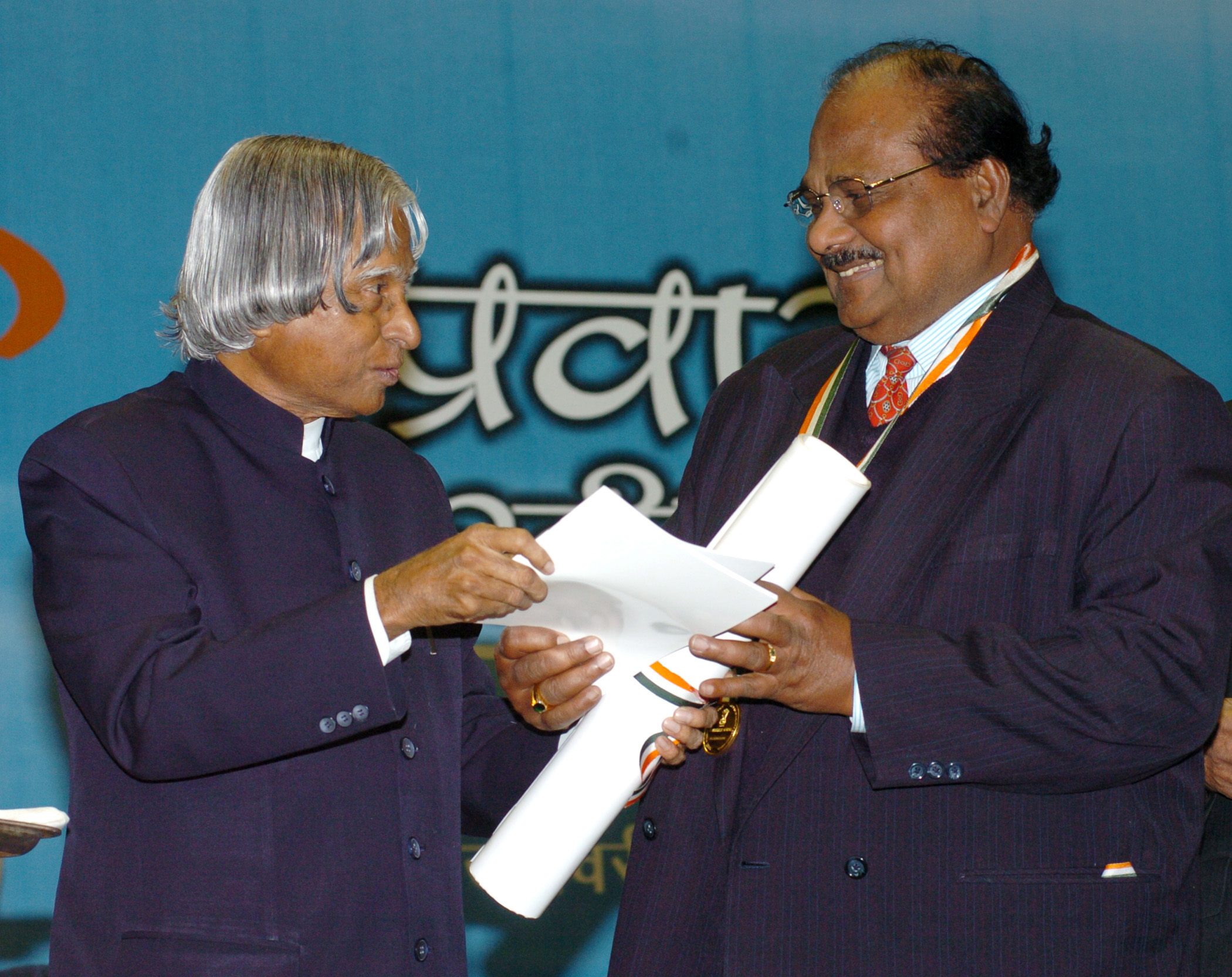
Dr. A P J Abdul Kalam bestowing the Pravasi Bharatiya Award for Public Affairs to Tan Sri Dato Dr. K.R Somasundram at the 5th Pravasi Bharatiya Divas-2007 in New Delhi on 9 January 2007

K R Somasundram (Tamil: கே. ஆர். சோமசுந்திரம்) (born 13 March 1930) is a Malaysian Indian. Born in Teluk Intan, Malaysia in 1930, he was the son of a grocer who gained prominence by heading the National Land Finance Co-Operative for the last two and a half decades.

== World War II ==
Somasundram attained basic education but this was interrupted with the advent of World War II. He joined the Indian National Army at the age of 14 and later after World War II trained at the Tanjung Rambutan Training Camp where he gained Executive rank by the age of 20. He was then posted to the Azad School in Singapore for Combatant Training.

== Political years ==
After his stint in the armed forces, Somasundram worked at Bukit Sidim Estate in Kedah and by 1962 became the Estate Manager, one of the first non-British to be in such a position. He became Vice Chairman of the Malaysian Indian Congress, Kedah Branch and a member of the National Central Working Committee. In 1967 he was elected as a Senator for Kedah. Part of his role was to represent the Malaysian Government in the 1968 UN General Assembly.

== Social influence ==
In 1960 Tun V.T. Sambanthan, leader of the Malaysian Indian Congress touted the idea of a social co-operative to help plantation workers during the British land sell-off. Tun Sambanthan and Somasundram worked closely to purchase their first estate at Bukit Sidim in that same year. The co-operative was later called National Land and Finance Co-operative Society (NLFCS). Somasundram took over the Chairmanship of the company upon the death of Tun Sambanthan and still actively manages the co-operative. He is also a strong advocate for Tamil rights in Malaysia. He has been generous with the money of the co-operative he heads.

== National Land Finance Cooperative Society Limited (NLFCS) ==
Today NLFCS has 19 estates totalling 35,000 acres (140 km^{2}), as well as investments in palm oil, property and banking at present the society has 9 subsidiaries along with 2 associate companies . Somasundram is currently Chairman of NLFCS and has been for the last two decades. The total active membership of the Society as at 31 December 2011 stood at 57,757 Shareholders.

Subsidiaries

- Nalfin Realties Sdn Bhd
- Minsawi Industries (KK) Sdn Bhd
- K.T Steel Sdn Bhd
- Nalfin Planting Materials Sdn Bhd
- Nalfin Healthcare Sdn Bhd
- Apollo Medical Centre Sdn Bhd
- Nalfin Trading Sdn Bhd
- Status Point Sdn Bhd
- Premier Nalfin Berhad (formerly known as Premier Nutrients Berhad)

Associate Companies

- Plantation Agencies Sdn Bhd
- Ecobuilt Packaging Sdn Bhd

== Honours and achievements ==
Due to his contribution to society through the co-operative he manages, Somasundram has been honoured on numerous occasions. In 1965 he received the AMN (equivalent to the British MBE), a Justice of the Peace (JP) in 1971, a Datoship in 1988 as well as being conferred a PSM, bearing the title 'Tan Sri' in 1996. He is also an honorary Indian citizen as well as being conferred a Doctorate by the University of Newcastle, Australia. Somasundram is also the first Indian Chairman of a floated firm in Malaysia (Premium Nutrients, Bursa Malaysia)

In 2007 he was awarded the prestigious Pravasi Bharatiya Samman by the president of India, Dr. A. P. J. Abdul Kalam. The award carries title of Padma Shree.

Somasundram has also been honored with a Malaysian Business Awards (MBA) Lifetime Achievement Award from the Kuala Lumpur Malay Chamber of Commerce (KLMCC)

=== Honour of Malaysia ===
- Malaysia
  - Member of the Order of the Defender of the Realm (A.M.N.) (1965)
  - Commander of the Order of Loyalty to the Crown of Malaysia (P.S.M.) (1996)
