= K. L. Devaser =

K.L. Devaser

4th President of the Malayan Indian Congress
- In office 1951 – May 1955
- Preceded by: K. Ramanathan
- Succeeded by: V. T. Sambanthan

Personal details
- Born: 20 February 1912 Amritsar, India
- Died: 6 March 1978 (aged 66) Kuala Lumpur, Malaysia
- Party: Malayan Indian Congress (MIC)
- Height: 6 ft 2 in (188 cm)
- Spouse: Saraswati Sodhy
- Children: 6
- Occupation: MIC Chairman; Lawyer

Kundan Lal Devaser was the fourth president of the Malayan Indian Congress from 1951 - 1955. It was under Devaser's presidency that the MIC joined the Alliance in 1954, which was then a political coalition formed between the United Malays National Organisation and the Malayan Chinese Association. The political alliance has stood the test of time over 50 years and continues today as the Barisan Nasional.

== President of MIC ==
The Malayan Indian Congress had contested in the 1952 Kuala Lumpur Municipal Elections in alliance with the Independence of Malaya Party (IMP) under Dato' Onn bin Jaffar and other non-communal organisations. However, the 1952 election proved MIC's attempt to preach and practise non-communalism would not prevail in Malayan politics when communalism was the winning factor. The defeat has shown MIC that it stands a better chance by joining the Alliance as it was the most workable and effective form of political machinery in the Malayan context.

According to Rajeswary Ampalavanar, author of The Indian Minority and Political Change in Malaya 1954-1957, the MIC leadership was quite eager to join the Alliance but there was some resistance within the party’s broader membership. They were willing to support the move if the party could secure some concessions from the Alliance on inter-communal issues, particularly on education.

Then MIC president K.L. Devaser came under heavy criticism from the Tamil media for not addressing the pressing issues facing the community. While he was quite outspoken, his influence was largely among the urban-based Indian elite and he lacked wider grassroots support.

Some in the party felt that there was a need for a leader with a stronger relationship with the party’s grassroots. In March 1955, reports in the local daily Tamil Murasu urged Tamils to boycott the MIC.

Tun V. T. Sambanthan, then a state MIC leader, emerged during this period as an alternative candidate for the party leadership. Going by historical records, he was literally coerced into taking up the presidency. Another candidate, P.P. Narayanan, was approached by party leaders but turned down their invitation because he wanted to concentrate on union activities.

== Malayan Independence ==
As an Alliance government backbencher, Devaser was involved with the debate over the draft Federation of Malaya Constitution in the Federal Legislative Council (the precursor to the Parliament of Malaysia).

He criticised the changes made to Article 10 making it unreasonable by removing judicial review of limitations imposed under the Article as proposed by the Reid Commission and giving the executive more powers. He argued:

...the draft Constitutional proposals take away the right of the court of law because the government can decide what is necessary and expedient, whereas the Reid Commission Report gives power to the court of law and the court of law can say that it is not in the interest of security of the Federation. As a lawyer I do feel that the right of the subject is much better safeguarded if the last say is in the court of law rather than in the hands of the executive authority...

Despite his objections, the Legislative Council approved the modified draft.
