= Sungai Siput =

Mukim (township) in Kuala Kangsar District, Perak, Malaysia

Coordinates: 4°49′12″N 101°4′12″E

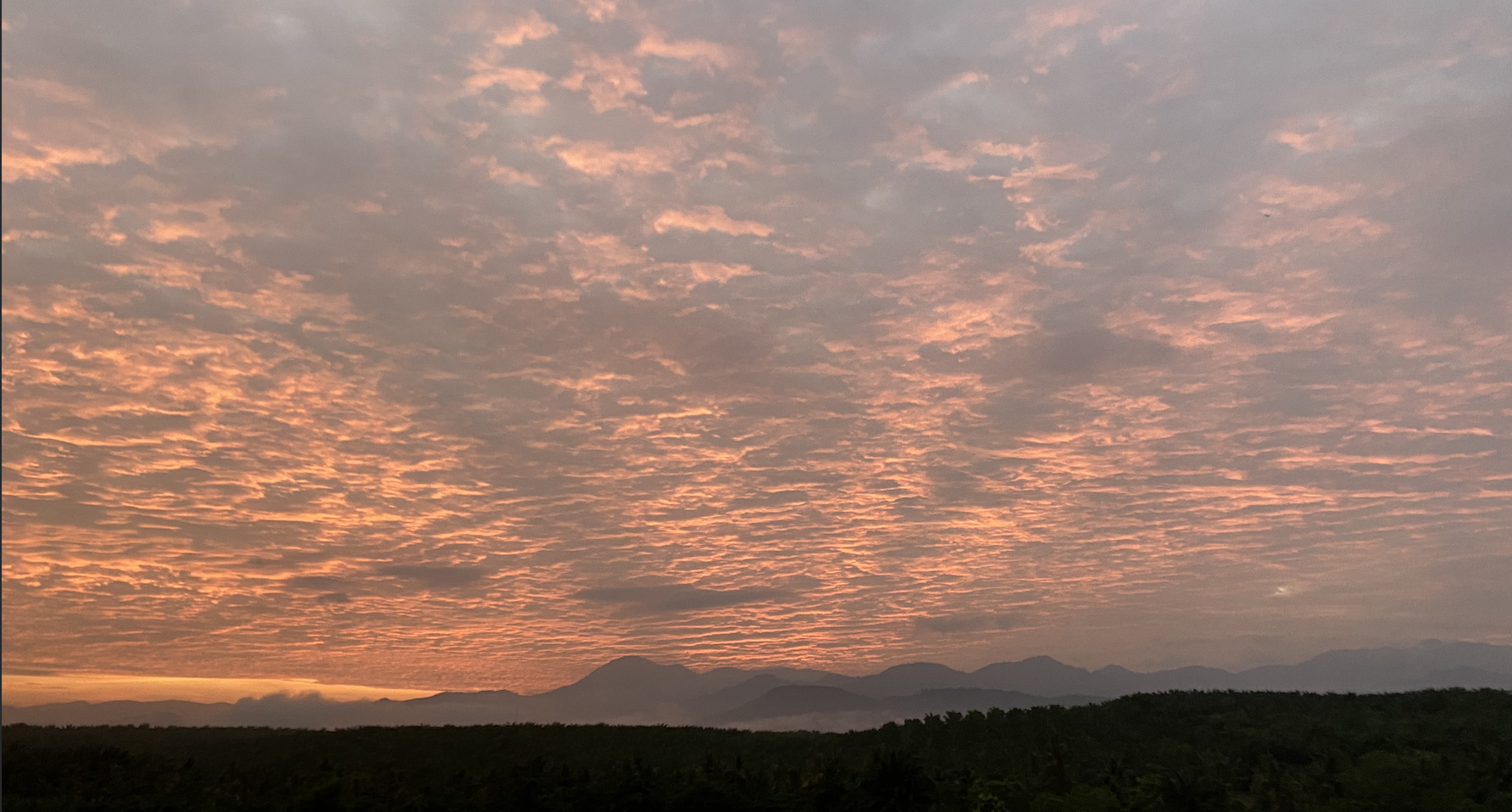
Sunrise from Sungai Siput at 7:00 am

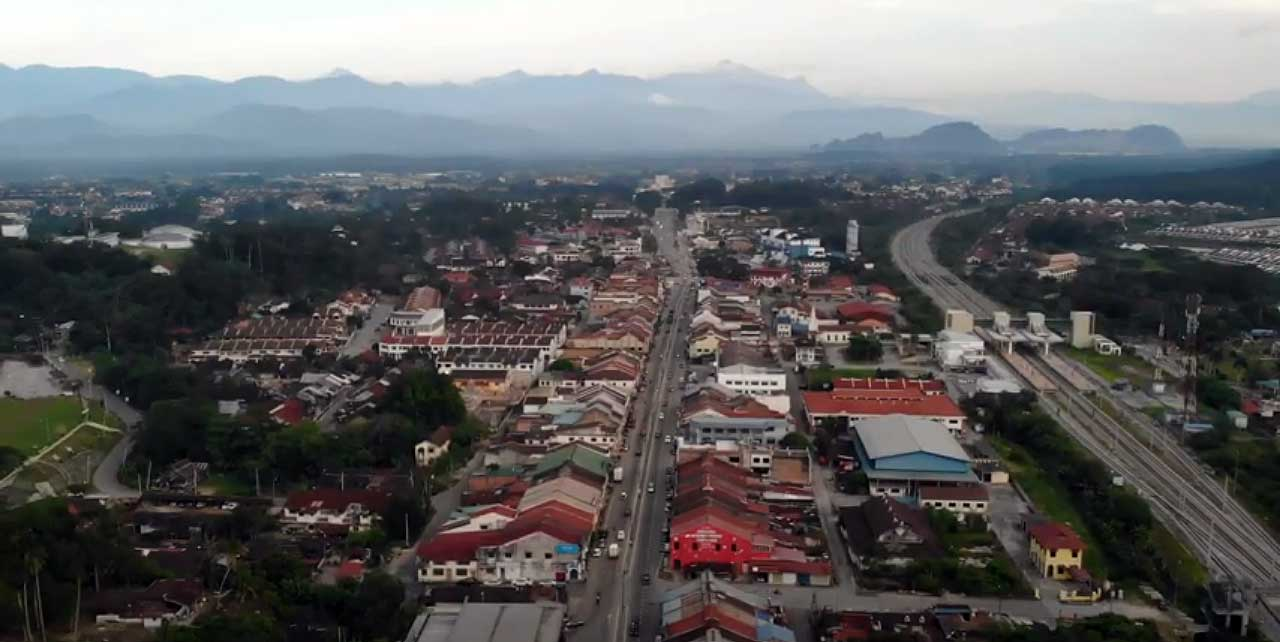
Aerial view of Sungai Siput

Mukim Sungai Siput in Kuala Kangsar District

Sungai Siput (Malay for 'snail river') is a town and mukim in Kuala Kangsar District, Perak, Malaysia, bordering Chemor, the northern suburb of Ipoh. It is also sometimes emphasized as Sungai Siput (Utara) to distinguish it from the similarly named town near Gopeng, Kinta District, located further south.

Administered under the Kuala Kangsar Municipal Council, Sungai Siput covers an area of 155,141 hectares, roughly 61.5% of the total area of Kuala Kangsar.

== History ==
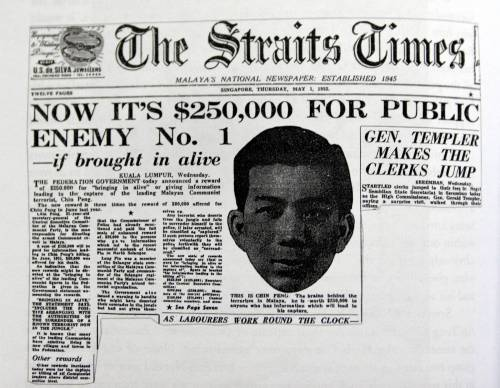
A headline of a 1952 Straits Times front page announcing a huge bounty for those who help locate and capture MCP leader Chin Peng.

Sungai Siput is notable for the incident that triggered the start of the Malayan Emergency. The Malayan colonial administration declared a state of emergency on 16 June 1948 after members of the Communist Party of Malaya killed three European plantation managers at a plantation office twenty miles east of Sungai Siput town. The CPM was subsequently banned in July. Many Singaporean historians and anti-communists allege that CPM commander Chin Peng had ordered the killings. Chin Peng claimed he had no prior knowledge. In fact, he said he was so unprepared for the start of hostility that he barely escaped arrest, losing his passport in the process, and lost touch with the party for a couple of days.

Li Weilun, an Esperanto professor at the Beijing Language and Culture University, was born in Sungai Siput in 1936.

== Demographics ==
Sungai Siput is one of the most ethnically balanced areas in Malaysia. The ethnic breakdown shows that the three major races are almost equal in size. Non-Malays make up more than 70% of the population. Notably, Sungai Siput has one of the highest Indian percentages in Malaysia, well over 30% in 2020. Sungai Siput also has a significant Orang Asli population, primarily comprising the Semai and Temiar tribes.

Ethnic groups in Sungai Siput, 2020 census
Ethnicity	Population	Percentage
Chinese	16,590	34.48%
Bumiputera	15,615	32.45%
Indian	14,436	30.0%
Others	93	0.19%
Non-citizens	1,378	2.88%
Total	48,112	100%

== In brief ==
Sungai Siput is governed by the Sungai Siput District and Land Office (Malay: Pejabat Daerah dan Tanah Sungai Siput). In 2010, Sungai Siput had an estimated population density of 49,000 inhabitants. The district's population in 2010 was Malay & other indigenous (Bumiputera) 15,745 (33.1%), Chinese 18,255 (38.4%), Indians 13,439 (28.3%) and other groups 113.

== Politics ==
The Sungai Siput parliamentary seat has consistently voted for Alliance and later Barisan Nasional candidates since independence. However, in the 2008 Malaysian general election was won Dr Jeyakumar Devaraj, a Parti Sosialis Malaysia member who contested under the People's Justice Party (PKR) ticket in the Pakatan Rakyat coalition. Dr Michael Jeyakumar Devaraj defeated the previous incumbent, Dato Seri Samy Vellu, who had held the seat since 1974. The seat was successfully defended by Kesavan Subramaniam (PKR) in the 2018 Malaysian general election. As of 2022, there were 72,452 voters in Sungai Siput. Most of the voters in Sungai Siput are Chinese, followed by Malays, Indians and others.

Ethnic breakdown of Sungai Siput's electorate as of 2022
1. Chinese (34.5%)
2. Malay (34.2%)
3. Indian (21.2%)
4. Other ethnicities (10.1%)

Sungai Siput has historically been a political stronghold for the Indian community. Prominent political figures such as V. T. Sambanthan and Samy Vellu, both the presidents of the Malaysian Indian Congress, were Dewan Rakyat representatives for the Sungai Siput constituency. The current Member of Parliament is also a Malaysian Indian.

== Education ==
Mahatma Gandhi Kalasalai Tamil School is the biggest Tamil school in the state with over 1,000 students. The school's construction was commissioned by Tun V. T. Sambanthan in 1954 and was officially opened by Vijaya Lakshmi Pandit, former Indian Prime Minister Jawaharlal Nehru's sister. The newest school in the community is SJK(T) Heawood Sungai Siput, built in 2024.

There is a community college in the town, Kolej Komuniti Sungai Siput.

=== Schools ===
Primary and secondary education are provided by a few schools in Sungai Siput, namely:

National primary schools
- SK Sungai Siput (U)
- SK Trosor
- SK Lasah
- SK RKT Lasah
- SK Jawang
- SK Temin
- SK Jalong
- SK Kampung Maamor
- SK Seroli
- SK Lintang
- SK Chenein
- SK Perlop 1
- SK Pos Poi
- SK Pos Perwor
- SK Pos Piah
- SK Kampung Kenang
- SK Pos Kuala Mu
- SK Pos Sungai Pelantok
- SK Kampung Muhibah

National missionary primary schools
- SK Methodist

National-type Chinese primary schools
- SJK(C) Sungai Buloh
- SJK(C) Shing Chung
- SJK(C) Jalong
- SJK(C) Lintang
- SJK(C) Lasah
- SJK(C) Rimba Panjang

National-type Tamil primary schools
- SJK(T) Heawood Sungai Siput
- SJK(T) Mahathma Gandhi Kalasalai
- SJK(T) Tun Sambanthan
- SJK(T) Ladang Elphil
- SJK(T) Ladang Sungai Reyla
- SJK(T) Ladang Dovenby

National secondary schools
- SMK Bawong
- SMK Datuk Hj Abd Wahab
- SMK RLKT Lasah
- SMK Toh Muda Abdul Aziz Sungai Siput (U)

Missionary national secondary schools
- SMK Methodist

National-type Chinese secondary schools
- SMJK Shing Chung

Islamic government-aided secondary schools (SABK)
- SMA Maahad Nurul Fadzliah

== Public amenities ==
In addition to schools and a community college, Sungai Siput also has a hospital. The 3-star MH Sentral Sungai Siput Hotel located on Jalan Kuala Kangsar is the primary place of lodging for tourists and VFR, usually during Chinese New Year and other festive periods. The town's largest supermarket is the TF Value-Mart hypermarket, which was the chain's sixth supermarket in the country.

The Sungai Siput District police headquarters is located in the town on Jalan Besar, with a total land size of 6.9ha and completed in June 2012.

The town has a swimming pool located on the premises of SMJK Shing Chung secondary school. It is open to the public when school is not in session.

There is also an indoor badminton court located in Kampung Sungai Buloh. It is open from 8:00 to 23:00 everyday.

== Points of interest ==
Sungai Siput is known for its natural beauty and hiking. Lion Hill (獅子山) is a common landmark of the region. The three main sites of interest are:

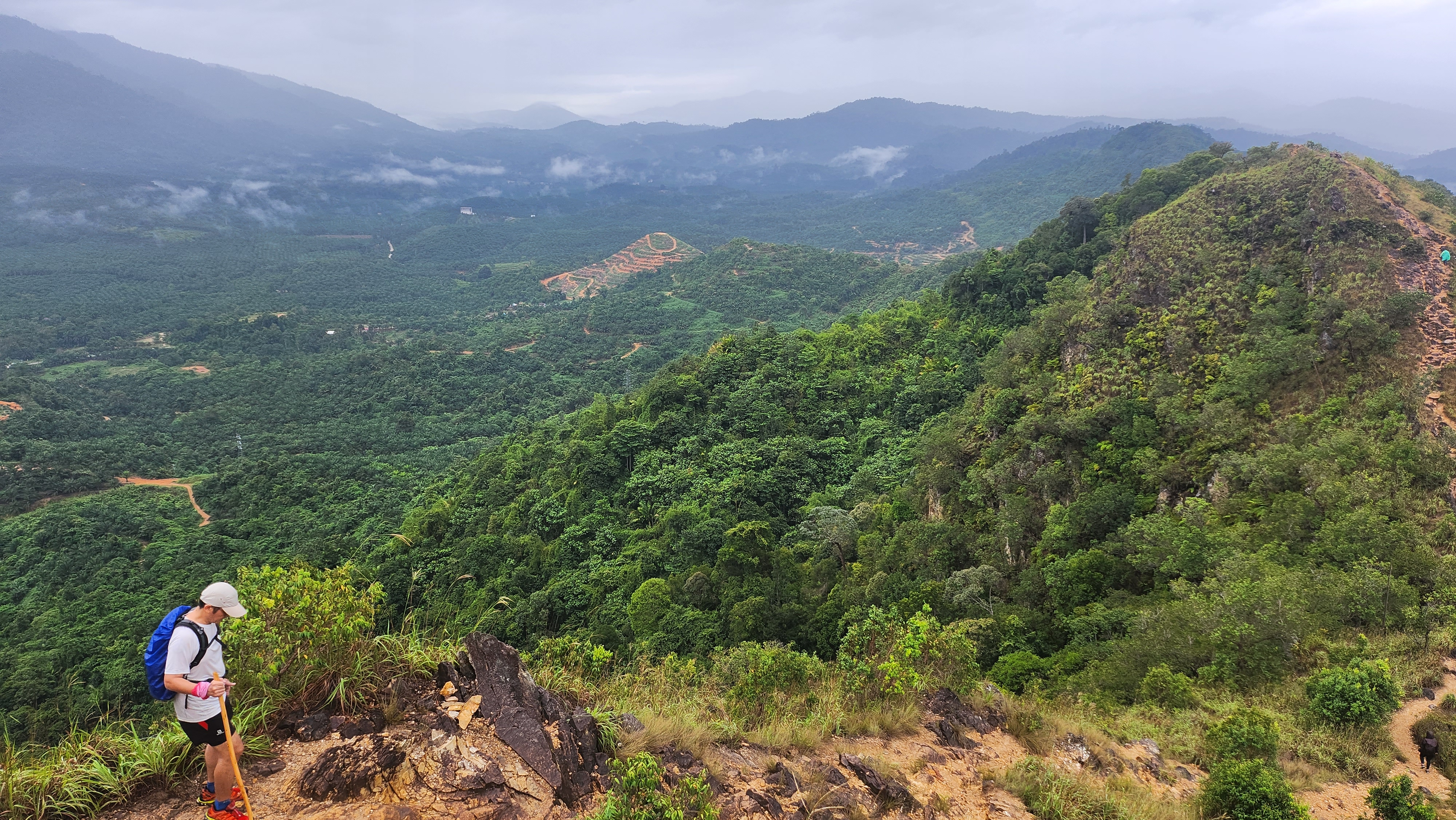
Bukit Berekeh in 2023

- Pos Kuala Mu, an Orang Asli village and a popular eco-tourism spot. Other villages, such as Kampung Beswok (Pos Yum) and Kampung Pendeq, are also popular tourist spots inhabited by the Orang Asli.
- Bukit Berekeh, a mountain known for its hiking trails and scenic viewpoint.
- MPOA Malayan Emergency Monument and Gallery, a museum showcasing artefacts and the history of the Malayan Emergency, near the site where the start of the Emergency occurred.
- Lata Sereiy Bawong, a waterfall featuring a rock pool deep enough for swimming and soaking.
- Lata Tengkoh Penyel, a scenic vertical waterfall considered by many to be one of the most beautiful waterfalls in Perak and West Malaysia. It is maintained by the local Temiar tribe, and parking costs RM10 per vehicle.

== Transportation ==
The town has well-developed road infrastructure, in part thanks to former MP and Minister of Works Samy Vellu. It is linked by roadways, with Kuala Kangsar to the north and Ipoh in the south. Various long-distance coach companies serve the town, mainly with connections to Kuala Lumpur and Singapore.

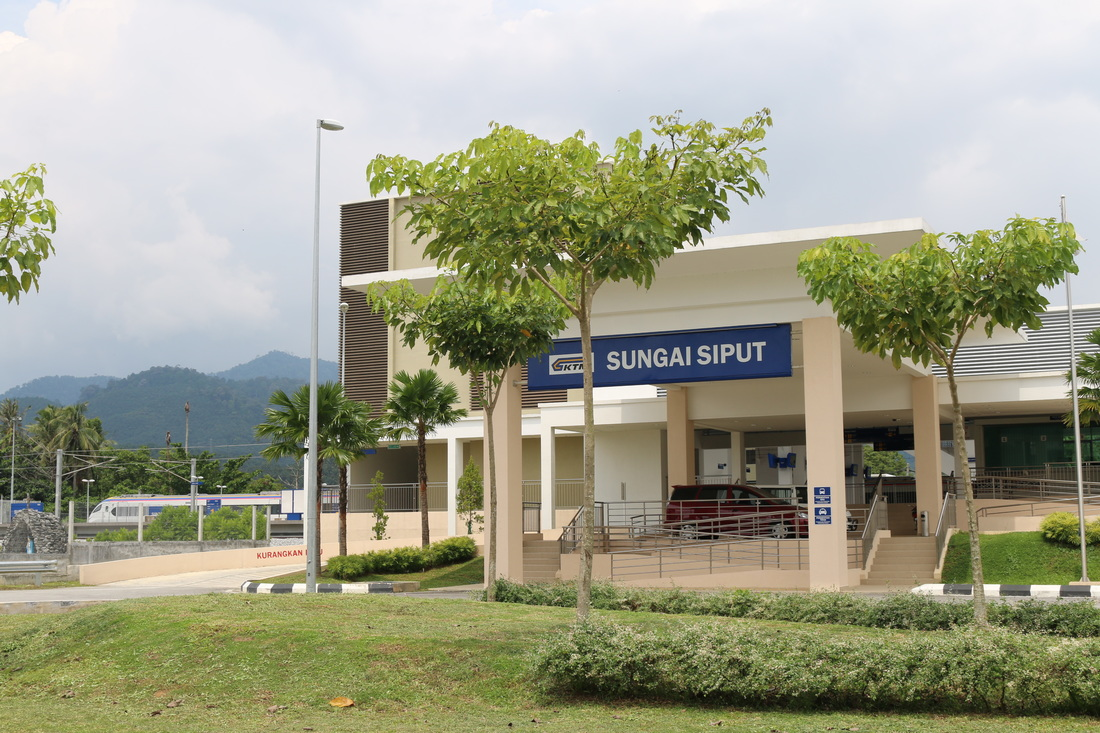
Sungai Siput railway station from the outside

Trains

- Inter-city rail: ETS Sungai Siput railway station

== Notable people ==
- V.T. Sambanthan, one of the three founder fathers of modern-day Malaysia

== See also ==
- Tamil population by cities
