= Michael Jeyakumar Devaraj =

Malaysian politician (born 1955)

Dr Michael Jeyakumar Devaraj
- மைக்கல் ஜெயகுமார்

Member of the Malaysian Parliament for Sungai Siput
- In office 8 March 2008 – 9 May 2018
- Preceded by: Samy Vellu (BN–MIC)
- Succeeded by: Kesavan Subramaniam (PH–PKR)
- Majority: 1,821 (2008); 2,793 (2013)

Chairman of Socialist Party of Malaysia
- Incumbent
- Assumed office 14 July 2019
- Preceded by: Mohd Nasir Hashim

Personal details
- Born: 28 March 1955 (age 71) Johor, Federation of Malaya (now Malaysia)
- Citizenship: Malaysian
- Party: Socialist Party of Malaysia (PSM)
- Education: University of Malaya (MBBS)
- Occupation: Politician
- Profession: Medical doctor

Michael Jeyakumar Devaraj (Tamil: மைக்கல் ஜெயகுமார்) (born 28 March 1955) is a Malaysian politician who is currently the chairperson of Socialist Party of Malaysia. He served in the Parliament of Malaysia as Member of Parliament for the Sungai Siput constituency in Perak from 2008 to 2018.

While a prominent member of the Socialist Party of Malaysia (PSM) he was elected to Parliament on the ticket of the People's Justice Party (PKR) in the Pakatan Rakyat (PR) opposition coalition. His win in the 2008 general election unseated Samy Vellu; the long-serving President of the Malaysian Indian Congress (MIC). At that point he was only the third MP to win Sungai Siput since independence, his two predecessors being MIC presidents VT Sambanthan and Samy Vellu. Samy Vellu had previously defeated Jeyakumar in Sungai Siput in the 1999 and 2004 general elections. Jeyakumar successfully retained his seat in the 2013 general election. However, he contested under PSM's own ticket and lost his seat in the 2018 general election, garnering just 3.52% of the votes cast and losing his deposit.

== Detention under Emergency Ordinance ==
In the run-up to Bersih 2.0 rally for electoral reform in Malaysia, Jeyakumar and other PSM members were arrested in June 2011, accused of trying to wage war against the king and revive Communism. In July 2011, he was arrested under the Emergency Ordinance (EO), which allows for indefinite detention without trial. He remained in solitary confinement until July 2011, spending a total of 28 days in detention. Jeyakumar credits his release to the support of the people.

== Personal life ==
Jeyakumar also practices as a medical doctor. He is the son of T. Devaraj, a surgeon known for his philanthropy, who turned 100 on June 21, 2024.

His wife Rani Rasiah is also a PSM founding member and central committee member who contested the Buntong state seat in the 2018 elections.

His siblings include former Aliran president Dr Prema Devaraj and Sheila Devaraj who is married to former minister Dr Xavier Jayakumar.

== Election results ==
Parliament of Malaysia
Year	Constituency	Candidate	Votes	Pct	Opponent(s)	Votes	Pct	Ballots cast	Majority	Turnout
1999	P059 Sungai Siput	Michael Jeyakumar Devaraj (DAP)^{1}	12,221	40.38%	Samy Vellu (MIC)	17,480	57.75%	31,165	5,259	63.62%
1999	P059 Sungai Siput	Michael Jeyakumar Devaraj (DAP)^{1}	12,221	40.38%	Mohamad Asri Othman (MDP)	565	1.87%	31,165	5,259	63.62%
2004	P062 Sungai Siput	Michael Jeyakumar Devaraj (PKR)^{2}	8,680	28.37%	Samy Vellu (MIC)	19,029	62.19%	31,583	10,349	67.51%
2004	P062 Sungai Siput	Michael Jeyakumar Devaraj (PKR)^{2}	8,680	28.37%	Shanmugam Ponmugam Ponnan (DAP)	2,890	9.44%	31,583	10,349	67.51%
2008	P062 Sungai Siput	Michael Jeyakumar Devaraj (PKR)^{2}	16,458	49.64%	Samy Vellu (MIC)	14,637	44.15%	33,154	1,821	69.91%
2008	P062 Sungai Siput	Michael Jeyakumar Devaraj (PKR)^{2}	16,458	49.64%	Nor Rizan Oon (IND)	867	2.61%	33,154	1,821	69.91%
2013	P062 Sungai Siput	Michael Jeyakumar Devaraj (PKR)^{2}	21,593	51.89%	Devamany Krishnasamy (MIC)	18,800	45.17%	41,617	2,793	80.70%
2013	P062 Sungai Siput	Michael Jeyakumar Devaraj (PKR)^{2}	21,593	51.89%	Nagalingam Singaravelloo (IND)	197	0.47%	41,617	2,793	80.70%
2018	P062 Sungai Siput	Michael Jeyakumar Devaraj (PSM)	1,505	3.52%	Kesavan Subramaniam (PKR)	20,817	48.72%	42,726	5,607	79.16%
2018	P062 Sungai Siput	Michael Jeyakumar Devaraj (PSM)	1,505	3.52%	Devamany Krishnasamy (MIC)	15,210	35.60%	42,726	5,607	79.16%
2018	P062 Sungai Siput	Michael Jeyakumar Devaraj (PSM)	1,505	3.52%	Ishak Ibrahim (PAS)	5,194	12.16%	42,726	5,607	79.16%

Note: ^{1} & ^{2} Michael Jeyakumar Devaraj, while a member of PSM, contested under the tickets of DAP in the 1999 election and PKR in the 2004, 2008 and 2013 elections.

== See also ==
- Sungai Siput (federal constituency)
