= Laws of the Constitution of Perak =

Constitution of the state of Perak, Malaysia

Laws of the Constitution of Perak Darul Ridzuan
- The coat of arms of Perak

Overview
- Original title: Undang-Undang Tubuh Kerajaan Perak Darul Ridzuan
- Jurisdiction: Perak, Malaysia
- Subordinate to: Federal Constitution of Malaysia
- Created: 1 February 1948 (First Part); 25 February 1953 (Second Part)
- System: Parliamentary democracy Constitutional monarchy

Government structure
- Branches: Two (Legislative and Executive)
- Head of state: Sultan of Perak
- Chambers: Unicameral
- Executive: State Executive Council

History
- Amendments: 36
- Last amended: 15 August 2023
- Signatories: First Part: In Malay: Raja Idris Iskandar Shah; RA Rashid; Wan Jalil; Raja Kamaralzaman; Bukit Gantang; Haji Hashim; Haji Mohamed Zain; In English: WHM Razalli; H Ahmad; R Musa; RN Ali; Raja Shahriman; Mohamed Hashim; RH Ali; Ibrahim; Panglima Kinta; M Razalli; RH Shahar Shah; T Abdullah; CM Yusuf; Second Part: In Malay: Raja Idris Iskandar Shah; Raja Kamaralzaman; Raja Ngah Ali; In English: RA Rashid; Raja Musa; Raja Ikram; Megat Yunus; Haji Wan Hamarudin; WHM Razalli; HM Razalli; Meor Abdullah; HM Eusoff; Bukit Gantang; Ibrahim; Mohamed Hashim; RH Ali; Raja Shahriman; R Badrishah; H Hashim; Mahmood; Harun; CM Yusuf

The Laws of the Constitution of Perak Darul Ridzuan is the constitution of the state of Perak in Malaysia and establishes the state as a constitutional monarchy with the Sultan of Perak as its head of state. It also laid down the fundamental structure and machinery of government in Perak, such as the state executive council and the state legislative assembly. It came into force in 1 February 1948 following the formation of the Federation of Malaya.

== History ==
The Laws of the Constitution of Perak Part I was firstly introduced on 1 February 1948, under the reign of Raja Abdul Aziz. Under the State Agreement, the Malay Rulers are required to promulgated their State Constitution of which are used to distinguish the legislative power from the executive power by constituting a legislative body. Part II was introduced on 25 February 1953 during the reign of his successor Sultan Yussuf Izzuddin Shah.

== Composition ==
The Laws of the Constitution of Perak in its current form since 21 August 2023, contains 2 parts, 30 chapters, 141 articles and no schedules (including 36 amendments).

=== First Part ===
- First Part Preliminaries

The First Part Preliminaries contains nine articles; article 1 to 9. This chapter pertains to amendments, reprint and interpretation of the terminologies used in the constitution. It also affirms Islam as the state religion and Sultan as the head of state, although "other religions may be practised in peace and harmony in any part of the State". In addition, First Part Preliminaries also addresses the powers of the Sultan according to law, the state seal and the representative of Sultan at the Conference of Rulers.

- Chapter 1 – Executive Authority and Chapter 2 – Majlis Mesyuarat Kerajaan

These two chapters contains twelve articles; article 10 to 27 minus deleted articles 13, 13A, 14, 14A, 15, 19, 20, 24 and 25. It pertains to executive authority power of the Sultan, the process of appointment of Menteri Besar of Perak, State Secretary, Legal Advisor, Financial Officer, and the members of Perak State Executive Council and rules regarding the proceedings of the council.

- Chapter 3 – Power of Pardon

This chapter contains one article; article 27A. It addresses the power of Sultan to give pardon, reprieve or respite to convicted criminals that carries out crime in the state.

- Chapter 4 – Special Provisions Relating to the Malays

This chapter contains one article; article 27B. It pertains to the special position of the Malays and the Sultan role of safeguarding it.

- Chapter 5 – Dewan Negeri

This chapter contains twenty-six articles; article 28 to 51 minus deleted article 37, 39, 42, 46 and 49. It pertains to the Perak State Legislative Assembly, its memberships, summoning, prorogation and dissolution, Speaker election, roles, and proceedings.

- Chapter 6 – Financial Provisions

This chapter contains six articles; article 52 to 57 minus deleted article 58. It addresses financial issues and the budget.

- Chapter 7 – General

This chapter contains four articles; article 59 to 62 minus deleted article 60. Article 59 provides that there shall be impartial treatment towards any state employees regardless of their races. Article 61 addresses the capacity of the state to acquire, hold or dispose of property of any kind, and to sue or be sued. Article 61A describes the state mottos, emblems and flags. Article 64 and 65 pertains to the interpretation of the constitution. Article 62 - The Royal Prerogatives, provides that the Constitution shall not affect the prerogatives, powers and jurisdiction of the Sultan.

- Chapter 8 – Interpretation

This chapter contains two articles; article 63 and 64 which respectively pertains to the interpretation of the constitution.

- Chapter 9 – Transitional Provisions

This chapter contains one article; article 64A. It addresses the membership of the temporary State Executive Council after the dissolution of Legislative Assembly.

=== Second Part ===
- Second Part Preliminaries

The Second Part Preliminaries contains four articles; article 1 to 4. Article 1 pertains to the promulgation of the second part of the constitution. Article 2 pertains to the power reserved to order further parts of the constitution. Article 3 pertains to the power to amend the constitution. Article 4 pertains to the interpretation of the terminologies used by the royal family.

- Chapter 1 – The Sovereign

Chapter 1 contains seven articles; article 5 to 11 minus deleted article 12. This chapter pertains to the Sultan of Perak, including the qualifications of becoming the Sultan, order of successions and rules regarding the demise and prerogatives of Sultan.

- Chapter 2 – Royal Seal

Chapter 2 contains only one article; article 13 that pertains to the usage for the Royal Seal on behalf of the Sultan by the Menteri Besar.

- Chapter 3 – Regency

Chapter 3 contains nine articles; article 13 and 18. It addresses the conditions that requires a regency, the process of appointing a regent and the regent's prerogatives and duties.

- Chapter 4 – Vacating of Throne

Chapter 4 contains five articles; article 19 to 24 minus deleted article 23. This chapter pertains to the abdication of the Sultan and the appointment of his successor.

- Chapter 5 – Honours and Dignitaries

Chapter 5 contains only one article; article 25. This chapter pertains to the Sultan's role as the fountain of honours and dignity.

- Chapter 6 – Consort of the Sovereign

Chapter 6 contains three articles; article 26 to 29 minus deleted article 27. It addresses rules regarding the appointment of consorts of the Sultan, their styles and titles and their entitlements.

- Chapter 7 – Bakal Sultan

Chapter 7 contains five articles; article 30 to 34. This chapter pertains to the three Heir Apparents of Perak chosen from among three persons holding titles of Raja Muda, Raja Bendahara (extinct) and Raja di-Hilir based on order of precedence.

- Chapter 8 – Consorts of the Bakal Sultan

Chapter 8 contains two articles; article 35 and 36. This chapter pertains to the appointment of the Consorts of the Bakal Sultan known as Raja Puan Besar (consort of Raja Muda) and Raja Puan Muda (consort of Raja di-Hilir).

- Chapter 9 – Titled Raja

Chapter 9 contains only one article; article 37 which pertains to the appointment and powers of four titled Raja – Raja Besar, Raja Sulong, Raja Tengah and Raja Bongsu.

- Chapter 10 – Orang Besar Negeri

Chapter 10 contains six articles; article 38 to 43. This chapter pertains to the appointment and powers of the Orang Besar Negeri and Toh Muda. All Orang Besar Negeri can be appointed Toh Muda except for Orang Besar Bendahara Seri Maharaja and Orang Kaya-Kaya Imam Paduka Tuan.

- Chapter 11 – Wives of the Orang Besar Negeri

Chapter 11 contains three articles; article 44 to 46. This chapter pertains to the appointment of the Wives of the Orang Besar Negeri also known as Toh Puan.

- Chapter 12 – Orang Besar Enam Belas

Chapter 12 contains two articles; article 47 and 48, which pertain to the appointment of Orang Besar Enam Belas from person who have rendered meritous service to the state.

- Chapter 13 – Other Titles

Chapter 13 contains two articles; article 49 and 50, which pertain to the appointment of person with other titles such as Orang Besar Tiga Puluh Dua and Order of Precedence of all the Orang Besars.

- Chapter 14 – Disqualification, Retirement and Degradation

Chapter 14 contains four articles; article 51 to 54, which pertain to the disqualification, retirement and degradation of Orang Besar Negeri.

- Chapter 15 – Keeper of Malay Custom

Chapter 15 contains only one article; article 55, which pertains to the appointment of Keeper of Malay Custom from Raja Bendahara (formerly), Orang Kaya Temenggong or any person acting on his behalf.

- Chapter 16 – State Motto and Insignia

Chapter 16 contains only one article; article 56, which pertains to Insignia of the Royalty, Standard of the Sovereign, the State Regalia and the Standards of the Bakal Sultan.

- Chapter 17 – Dewan Negara

Chapter 17 contains sixteen articles; article 57 to 72. This chapter pertains to the appointment and powers of members of Dewan Negara a council of persons that aids and advise the Sultan in his duties.

- Chapter 18 – Officers of the Dewan Negara Throughout the State

Chapter 18 contains four articles; article 73 to 76. This chapter pertains to the appointment and powers of the officers of the Dewan Negara.

- Chapter 19 – Political Pensions and Compassionate Allowances

Chapter 19 contains two articles; article 77 and 78 that pertains to the power of the Sultan with Legislative Assembly consent to grant political pensions and compassionate allowances to his descendants.
