= Kesavan Subramaniam =

Malaysian politician

Yang Berhormat Tuan Kesavan Subramaniam MP
- கேசவன் சுப்ரமணியம்

Member of the Malaysian Parliament for Sungai Siput
- Incumbent
- Assumed office 9 May 2018
- Preceded by: Michael Jeyakumar Devaraj (PR–PKR)
- Majority: 5,607 (2018); 1,846 (2022)

Member of the Perak State Legislative Assembly for Hutan Melintang
- In office 8 March 2008 – 9 May 2018
- Preceded by: Rajoo Govindasamy (BN–MIC)
- Succeeded by: Khairuddin Tarmizi (BN–UMNO)
- Majority: 1,721 (2008); 1,240 (2013)

Faction represented in Dewan Rakyat
- 2018–: Pakatan Harapan

Faction represented in Perak State Legislative Assembly
- 2008–2018: People's Justice Party

Personal details
- Born: Kesavan s/o Subramaniam; 1975 (age 50–51) Teluk Intan, Perak, Malaysia
- Citizenship: Malaysian
- Party: People's Justice Party (PKR)
- Other political affiliations: Pakatan Harapan (PH); Pakatan Rakyat (PR)
- Occupation: Politician
- Website: Kesavan Subramaniam on Facebook
- Kesavan Subramaniam on Parliament of Malaysia

Kesavan s/o Subramaniam (Tamil: கேசவன் சுப்ரமணியம், romanized: Kēcavaṉ cupramaṇiyam) is a Malaysian politician who has served as the Member of Parliament (MP) for Sungai Siput since May 2018. He served as Member of the Perak State Legislative Assembly (MLA) for Hutan Melintang from March 2008 to May 2018. He is a member of the People's Justice Party (PKR), a component party of Pakatan Harapan (PH) coalition.

== Controversy ==
In May 2019, Kesavan was accused of sexual harassment by a woman who claimed to be his former aide in a police report she had lodged. However, Kesavan had denied the accusation and her allegation of being his former assistant. Kesavan had counter filed a police report against the woman and claimed she had taken advantage of himself and had tried to disrupt his family instead. On 16 July, Indrani Ramasamy who was the alleged PKR Sungai Siput treasurer and parliamentary research officer, filed a defamation suit against Kesavan.

== Election results ==
Perak State Legislative Assembly
Year	Constituency	Candidate	Votes	Pct	Opponent(s)	Votes	Pct	Ballots cast	Majority	Turnout
2008	N54 Hutan Melintang	Kesavan Subramaniam (PKR)	7,804	53.61%	Thangasvari Suppiah (MIC)	6,083	46.39%	14,556	1,721	70.12%
2013	N54 Hutan Melintang	Kesavan Subramaniam (PKR)	10,155	51.19%	Supramaniam Ramalingam (MIC)	8,915	44.94%	20,472	1,240	83.09%
2013	N54 Hutan Melintang	Kesavan Subramaniam (PKR)	10,155	51.19%	Azahari Abdullah (BERJASA)	353	1.78%	20,472	1,240	83.09%
2013	N54 Hutan Melintang	Kesavan Subramaniam (PKR)	10,155	51.19%	Mat Sidi Hashim (IND)	413	2.08%	20,472	1,240	83.09%

Parliament of Malaysia
Year	Constituency	Candidate	Votes	Pct	Opponent(s)	Votes	Pct	Ballots cast	Majority	Turnout
2018	P062 Sungai Siput	Kesavan Subramaniam (PKR)	20,817	48.72%	Devamany Krishnasamy (MIC)	15,210	35.60%	42,726	5,607	77.68%
2018	P062 Sungai Siput	Kesavan Subramaniam (PKR)	20,817	48.72%	Ishak Ibrahim (PAS)	5,194	13.84%	42,726	5,607	77.68%
2018	P062 Sungai Siput	Kesavan Subramaniam (PKR)	20,817	48.72%	Michael Jeyakumar Devaraj (PSM)	1,505	3.52%	42,726	5,607	77.68%
2022	P062 Sungai Siput	Kesavan Subramaniam (PKR)	21,637	41.89%	Vigneswaran Sanasee (MIC)	19,791	38.32%	51,802	1,846	71.34%
2022	P062 Sungai Siput	Kesavan Subramaniam (PKR)	21,637	41.89%	Irudhanathan Gabriel (BERSATU)	8,190	15.86%	51,802	1,846	71.34%
2022	P062 Sungai Siput	Kesavan Subramaniam (PKR)	21,637	41.89%	Ahmad Fauzi Mohd Jaafar (PEJUANG)	784	1.52%	51,802	1,846	71.34%
2022	P062 Sungai Siput	Kesavan Subramaniam (PKR)	21,637	41.89%	R.Indrani (IND)	767	1.19%	51,802	1,846	71.34%
2022	P062 Sungai Siput	Kesavan Subramaniam (PKR)	21,637	41.89%	Baharudin Kamarudin (IND)	598	1.16%	51,802	1,846	71.34%
2022	P062 Sungai Siput	Kesavan Subramaniam (PKR)	21,637	41.89%	Rajah Narasaim (IND)	35	0.07%	51,802	1,846	71.34%

== Honours ==
=== Honours of Malaysia ===
- Malaysia
  - Recipient of the 17th Yang di-Pertuan Agong Installation Medal
