= Mohd Zolkafly Harun =

Malaysian politician

Yang Berhormat Dato' Mohd Zolkafly Harun DPMP PMP KMN AMP PPT JP MLA
- محمد ذوالكفل بن هارون

Member of the Perak State Executive Council
- Incumbent
- Assumed office 22 November 2022
- Monarch: Nazrin Shah
- Menteri Besar: Saarani Mohamad
- Portfolio: Rural Development, Plantation, Agriculture & Food Industry (Note: Assumed portfolios on 23 November 2022 taking office.)
- Preceded by: Zainol Fadzi Paharudin (Rural Development); Razman Zakaria (Plantation, Agriculture & Food Industry)
- Constituency: Lintang
- In office 10 December 2020 – 21 November 2022
- Monarch: Nazrin Shah
- Menteri Besar: Saarani Mohamad
- Portfolio: Infrastructure, Energy, Water & Public Transportation
- Preceded by: Himself
- Succeeded by: Mohammad Nizar Jamaluddin
- Constituency: Lintang
- In office 12 May 2020 – 5 December 2020
- Monarch: Nazrin Shah
- Menteri Besar: Ahmad Faizal Azumu
- Portfolio: Infrastructure, Energy, Water & Public Transportation
- Preceded by: Abdul Yunus Jamahri (Infrastructure); Paul Yong Choo Kiong (Public Transportation)
- Succeeded by: Himself
- Constituency: Lintang

Member of the Perak State Legislative Assembly for Lintang
- Incumbent
- Assumed office 5 May 2013
- Preceded by: Ahamad Pakeh Adam (BN–UMNO)
- Majority: 3,977 (2013); 4,582 (2018); 5,280 (2022)

Faction represented in Perak State Legislative Assembly
- 2013–: Barisan Nasional

Personal details
- Born: Mohd Zolkafly bin Harun Perak, Malaysia
- Citizenship: Malaysian
- Party: United Malays National Organisation (UMNO)
- Other political affiliations: Barisan Nasional (BN)
- Occupation: Politician

Mohd Zolkafly bin Harun is a Malaysian politician who has served as Member of the Perak State Executive Council (EXCO) in the Perikatan Nasional (PN) and Barisan Nasional (BN) state administrations under Menteris Besar Ahmad Faizal Azumu and Saarani Mohamad since May 2020 and Member of the Perak State Legislative Assembly (EXCO) for Lintang since May 2013. He is a member of the United Malays National Organisation (UMNO), a component party of the BN coalition.

== Election results ==
Perak State Legislative Assembly
Year	Constituency	Candidate	Votes	Pct	Opponent(s)	Votes	Pct	Ballots cast	Majority	Turnout
2013	N21 Lintang	Mohd Zolkafly Harun (UMNO)	11,444	60.52%	Ahmad Mazlan Othman (PAS)	7,467	39.48%	17,409	3,977	83.00%
2018	N21 Lintang	Mohd Zolkafly Harun (UMNO)	10,605	52.79%	Madhi Hasan (PKR)	6,023	29.99%	17,409	4,582	83.00%
2018	N21 Lintang	Mohd Zolkafly Harun (UMNO)	10,605	52.79%	Isran Fahmi Ismail (PAS)	3,460	17.22%	17,409	4,582	83.00%
2022	N21 Lintang	Mohd Zolkafly Harun (UMNO)	12,025	48.43%	Ahmad Daslie Osman (BERSATU)	6,745	27.16%	24,831	5,280	75.00%
2022	N21 Lintang	Mohd Zolkafly Harun (UMNO)	12,025	48.43%	Za'im Sidqi Zulkifly (PKR)	6,061	24.41%	24,831	5,280	75.00%

== Honours ==
=== Honours of Malaysia ===
- Malaysia
  - Officer of the Order of the Defender of the Realm (KMN) (2017)
- Perak
  - Knight Commander of the Order of the Perak State Crown (DPMP) – Dato' (2006)
  - Commander of the Order of the Perak State Crown (PMP)
  - Member of the Order of the Perak State Crown (AMP) (1996)
  - Recipient of the Distinguished Conduct Medal (PPT)
  - Justice of the Peace (JP) (2004)
