= Lintang (state constituency) =

Political subdivision in Malaysia

Lintang (N21)
Perak constituency

State constituency
- Legislature: Perak State Legislative Assembly
MLA
Mohd Zolkafly Harun
BN
- Constituency created: 1974
- First contested: 1974
- Last contested: 2022

Demographics
- Electors (2022): 33,107

Lintang is a state constituency in Perak, Malaysia, that has been represented in the Perak State Legislative Assembly.

== Demographics ==
Ethnic breakdown of Lintang's electorate as of 2022
1. Malay (54.9%)
2. Other ethnicities (16.4%)
3. Chinese (16.0%)
4. Indian (12.6%)

== History ==
=== Polling districts ===
According to the gazette issued on 31 October 2022, the Lintang constituency has a total of 26 polling districts.

State constituency	Polling Districts	Code	Location
Lintang（N21）	Kampong Kandang Hulu	062/21/01	SK Kota Lama Kanan
Lintang（N21）	Kampong Batang Kulim	062/21/02	SK Kota Lama Kanan
Lintang（N21）	Salak North	062/21/03	SK Setia Jaya
Lintang（N21）	Kampong Enggor	062/21/04	SJK(T) Enggor
Lintang（N21）	Karai Luar	062/21/05	SJK(C) Sey Wah
Lintang（N21）	Pekan Karai	062/21/06	SJK(C) Sey Wah
Lintang（N21）	Kampong Karai	062/21/07	SK Karai
Lintang（N21）	Kampong Jawang	062/21/08	SK Jawang
Lintang（N21）	Changkat Salak	062/21/09	SJK(T) Ladang Changkat Salak
Lintang（N21）	Salak Timor	062/21/10	SJK(C) Salak Bahru
Lintang（N21）	Kamuning Barat	062/21/11	SJK(C) Shing Chung
Lintang（N21）	Kamuning Timor	062/21/12	SJK(C) Shing Chung
Lintang（N21）	Kampong Temin	062/21/13	SK Temin
Lintang（N21）	Sungai Pelus	062/21/14	SK Trosor
Lintang（N21）	Trosor	062/21/15	SK Seroli
Lintang（N21）	Kampong Mor	062/21/16	SK Kampong Maamor
Lintang（N21）	LKTP Lasah	062/21/17	SMK RLKT Lasah
Lintang（N21）	Lintang	062/21/18	SK Lintang
Lintang（N21）	Ladang Elphil	062/21/19	SJK(T) Ladang Elphil
Lintang（N21）	Rancangan Belia Khas Berlop	062/21/20	SJK(C) Lasah
Lintang（N21）	Chior Lasah	062/21/21	SK Lasah
Lintang（N21）	Chenin	062/21/22	SK Chenin
Lintang（N21）	Pos Piah	062/21/23	SK Pos Piah
Lintang（N21）	Pos Perwor	062/21/24	SK Pos Perwor
Lintang（N21）	Pos Legap	062/21/25	SK Pos Legap
Lintang（N21）	Pos Kuala Mu	062/21/26	SK Pos Kuala Mu

=== Representation history ===
Members of the Legislative Assembly for Lintang
Assembly	No	Years	Name	Party
Constituency created from Karai
4th	N09	1974-1978	Mohamed Bashir Mohamed Bahari	BN (UMNO)
5th	N09	1978-1982	Mohamed Bashir Mohamed Bahari	BN (UMNO)
6th	N09	1982-1986	Meor Osman Pinawa	BN (UMNO)
7th	N15	1986-1990	Meor Osman Pinawa	BN (UMNO)
8th	N15	1990-1995	Mohamad Padil Harun	BN (UMNO)
9th	N18	1995-1999	Mohamad Padil Harun	BN (UMNO)
10th	N18	1999-2004	Mohamad Padil Harun	BN (UMNO)
11th	N21	2004-2008	Ahamad Pakeh Adam	BN (UMNO)
12th	N21	2008-2013	Ahamad Pakeh Adam	BN (UMNO)
13th	N21	2013-2018	Mohd Zolkafly Harun	BN (UMNO)
14th	N21	2018-2022	Mohd Zolkafly Harun	BN (UMNO)
15th	N21	2022–present	Mohd Zolkafly Harun	BN (UMNO)

== Election results ==
Perak state election, 2022
Party	Candidate	Votes	%	∆%
BN	Mohd Zolkafly Harun	12,025	48.43	▼4.36
PN	Ahmad Daslie Osman	6,745	27.16	▲27.16
PH	Zaim Sidqi Zulkifly	6,061	24.41	▲24.41
Total valid votes		24,831	100.00	
Total rejected ballots		469		
Unreturned ballots		34		
Turnout		25,334	76.52	▼4.32
Registered electors		33,107		
Majority		5,280	21.27	▼1.54
BN hold		Swing		

Perak state election, 2018
Party	Candidate	Votes	%	∆%
BN	Mohd Zolkafly Harun	10,605	52.79	▼7.73
PKR	Madhi Hasan	6,023	29.98	▲29.98
PAS	Isran Fahmi Ismail	3,460	17.22	▼22.26
Total valid votes		20,088	97.87	
Total rejected ballots		383	1.87	
Unreturned ballots		54	0.26	
Turnout		20,525	80.84	▼1.46
Registered electors		25,389		
Majority		4,582	22.81	▲1.77
BN hold		Swing		
Source(s) "RESULTS OF CONTESTED ELECTION AND STATEMENTS OF THE POLL AFTER THE OFFICIAL ADDITION OF VOTES".

Perak state election, 2013
Party	Candidate	Votes	%	∆%
BN	Mohd Zolkafly Harun	11,444	60.52	▲5.86
PAS	Ahmad Mazlan Othman	7,467	39.48	▲39.48
Total valid votes		18,911	98.05	
Total rejected ballots		374	1.94	
Unreturned ballots		2	0.01	
Turnout		19,287	82.30	▲12.73
Registered electors		23,433		
Majority		3,977	21.04	▲11.77
BN hold		Swing		
Source(s) "KEPUTUSAN PILIHAN RAYA UMUM DEWAN UNDANGAN NEGERI". Archived from the original on 2022-03-25.

Perak state election, 2008
Party	Candidate	Votes	%	∆%
BN	Ahamad Pakeh Adam	8,066	54.66	▼9.78
PKR	Mohamad Aun Yob Abas	6,690	45.39	▲45.39
Total valid votes		14,756	97.44	
Total rejected ballots		387	2.56	
Unreturned ballots		0	0	
Turnout		15,143	69.57	▲1.68
Registered electors		21,767		
Majority		1,376	9.27	▼28.16
BN hold		Swing		
Source(s) "KEPUTUSAN PILIHAN RAYA UMUM DEWAN UNDANGAN NEGERI PERAK BAGI TAHUN 2008".

Perak state election, 2004
Party	Candidate	Votes	%	∆%
BN	Ahamad Pakeh Adam	9,278	64.44	▼3.01
PAS	Ahmad Mazlan Othman	3,889	27.01	▼11.56
DAP	Ponniah A/L Narayanasamy	1,230	8.54	▲8.54
Total valid votes		14,397	97.35	
Total rejected ballots		354	2.39	
Unreturned ballots		38	0.26	
Turnout		14,789	67.89	▲4.58
Registered electors		21,785		
Majority		5,389	37.43	▲14.57
BN hold		Swing		
Source(s) "KEPUTUSAN PILIHAN RAYA UMUM DEWAN UNDANGAN NEGERI PERAK BAGI TAHUN 2004".

Perak state election, 1999
Party	Candidate	Votes	%	∆%
BN	Mohamad Padil Harun	7,948	61.43	▲20.58
PAS	Ahmad Mazlan Othman	4,990	38.57	▼20.58
Total valid votes		12,938	95.62	
Total rejected ballots		389	2.87	
Unreturned ballots		204	1.51	
Turnout		13,531	63.31	▼4.20
Registered electors		21,374		
Majority		2,958	22.86	▼41.16
BN hold		Swing		
Source(s) "KEPUTUSAN PILIHAN RAYA UMUM DEWAN UNDANGAN NEGERI PERAK BAGI TAHUN 1999".

Perak state election, 1995
Party	Candidate	Votes	%	∆%
BN	Mohamad Padil Harun	10,737	82.01	▲11.06
PAS	Zawi Mohd Saman	2,356	17.99	▲17.99
Total valid votes		13,093	96.61	
Total rejected ballots		415	3.06	
Unreturned ballots		44	0.32	
Turnout		13,552	67.51	▼1.75
Registered electors		20,074		
Majority		8,381	64.02	▲22.12
BN hold		Swing		
Source(s) "KEPUTUSAN PILIHAN RAYA UMUM DEWAN UNDANGAN NEGERI PERAK BAGI TAHUN 1999".

Perak state election, 1990
Party	Candidate	Votes	%	∆%
BN	Mohamad Padil Harun	8,180	70.95	▼6.87
S46	Mahalil Mohammad Ishak	3,349	29.05	▲29.05
Total valid votes		11,529	96.11	
Total rejected ballots		467	3.89	
Unreturned ballots		0	0	
Turnout		11,996	69.26	▲2.13
Registered electors		17,320		
Majority		4,831	41.90	▼13.74
BN hold		Swing		
Source(s) "KEPUTUSAN PILIHAN RAYA UMUM DEWAN UNDANGAN NEGERI PERAK BAGI TAHUN 1990".

Perak state election, 1986
Party	Candidate	Votes	%	∆%
BN	Meor Osman Pinawa	7,797	77.82	▲2.66
PAS	Mohamed Razilah Dahalan	2,222	22.18	▲14.22
Total valid votes		10,019	100.00	
Total rejected ballots		644		
Unreturned ballots		0		
Turnout		10,663	67.13	▼3.60
Registered electors		15,884		
Majority		5,575	55.64	▼2.64
BN hold		Swing		
Source(s) "KEPUTUSAN PILIHAN RAYA UMUM DEWAN UNDANGAN NEGERI PERAK BAGI TAHUN 1986".

Perak state election, 1982
Party	Candidate	Votes	%
BN	Meor Osman Imam Pinawa	7,721	75.17
DAP	Wong Show Sheen	1,734	16.88
PAS	Mohd Salleh Ibrahim	817	7.95
Total valid votes		10,272	100.00
Total rejected ballots		238	
Unreturned ballots		0	
Turnout		10,510	70.73
Registered electors		14,860	
Majority		5,987	58.28
BN hold		Swing	

Perak state election, 1978
Party	Candidate	Votes	%	∆%
On the nomination day, Mohamed Bashir H. M. Bahari won uncontested.
BN	Mohamed Bashir H. M. Bahari			
Total valid votes				
Total rejected ballots				
Unreturned ballots				
Turnout				
Registered electors		12,980		
Majority				
BN hold		Swing		

Perak state election, 1974
Party	Candidate	Votes	%
BN	Mohamed Bashir H. M. Bahari	6,042	73.65
DAP	Zainuddin Itam Abdul Samad	1,969	24.00
PEKEMAS	M. Maniam	193	2.35
Total valid votes		8,204	100.00
Total rejected ballots		220	
Unreturned ballots		0	
Turnout		8,424	75.53
Registered electors		11,153	
Majority		4,073	49.65
This was a new constituency created.
