= Members of the Dewan Negara, 15th Malaysian Parliament =

15th Parliament of Malaysia
←	14th Parliament	16th Parliament	→

Overview
- Legislative body: Parliament of Malaysia
- Jurisdiction: Malaysia
- Meeting place: Malaysian Houses of Parliament
- Election: Indirect election and appointments
- Website: www.parlimen.gov.my

Dewan Negara
- Members: 70
- President: Rais Yatim (until 15 June 2023); Wan Junaidi Tuanku Jaafar (until 18 January 2024); Mutang Tagal (until 10 May 2024); Awang Bemee Awang Ali Basah
- Deputy President: Nur Jazlan Mohamed
- Secretary: Muhammad Sujairi Abdullah
- Party control: Pakatan Harapan; Barisan Nasional; Gabungan Parti Sarawak; Gabungan Rakyat Sabah

Sovereign
- Yang di-Pertuan Agong: Al-Sultan Abdullah Ri'ayatuddin Al-Mustafa Billah Shah (until 30 January 2024); Sultan Ibrahim

Sessions
- 1st: 1st Meeting: 21 December 2022
- 2nd: 1st Meeting : 13 February 2023, 21 March 2023 – 6 April 2023; 2nd Meeting : 19 June 2023 – 27 June 2023; Special Meeting: 20 September 2023 – 26 September 2023; 3rd Meeting : 27 November 2023 – 14 December 2023; Special Meeting: 19 February 2024
- 3rd: 1st Meeting : 26 February 2024, 18 March 2024 – 4 April 2024; 2nd Meeting : 22 July 2024 – 1 August 2024; 3rd Meeting : 3 December 2024 – 19 December 2024
- 4th: 1st Meeting : 3 February 2025, 3 March 2025 – 25 March 2025; 2nd Meeting : 25 August 2025 – 10 September 2025; 3rd Meeting : 1 December 2025 – 18 December 2025
- 5th: 1st Meeting : 19 January 2026, 23 February 2026 – 12 March 2026; 2nd Meeting : 20 July 2026 – 4 August 2026; 3rd Meeting : 30 November 2026 – 22 December 2026

The following is the list of members of the Dewan Negara (Senate) of the 15th Malaysian Parliament. 26 out of 70 senators, i.e. two senators for each state, are elected by their respective State Legislative Assembly for three-year term. The other 44, including four senators representing Federal Territories, are appointed by the Yang di-Pertuan Agong also for three-year term.

Barisan Nasional (BN) remains the plurality in the Dewan Negara, but remains a part of a governing coalition in the Dewan Rakyat (House of Representatives) led by the Pakatan Harapan (PH), together with the other East Malaysian coalitions/parties; Gabungan Parti Sarawak (GPS), Gabungan Rakyat Sabah (GRS) and other small parties and independent MPs who back their supports to the Anwar Ibrahim-led unity government. This is due to the constitutional nature that senators are not elected directly by the people, but instead elected by the State Legislative Assemblies or appointed by the Yang di-Pertuan Agong, which most of senatorial elections or appointments took place in the previous parliamentary term, i.e. the 14th Parliament.

The 15th Parliament started on 19 December 2022 when all members of the Dewan Rakyat (House of Representatives) elected in the 15th general election sat for the first time and the Dewan Negara had its first meeting 2 days later.

== Current composition ==
The current composition of the Dewan Negara as of 10 September 2026.

Government + Independent (48)														Opposition (8)		Vacant (14)
PH			BN			GPS				GRS		STAR	IND	PN		VAC
20			11			6				3		1	7	8		14
10	8	2	8	3	0	3	1	1	1	2	1	1	7	7	1	14
PKR	DAP	AMANAH	UMNO	MCA	MIC	PBB	PRS	PDP	SUPP	GAGASAN	UPKO	STAR	IND	PAS	WAWASAN	VAC

== Seating arrangement ==
This seating arrangement is the current updated arrangement as of 11 May 2026.

Vacant	Vacant	Thiagarajah Rajagopal	E	Sergeant-at-Arm	D	Rosni Sohar	Sheikh Umar Bagharib Ali	Vacant
Vacant	Vacant	Larry Asap	E		D	Leong Ngah Ngah	Phoong Jin Zhe	Vacant
Vacant	Vacant	Vacant	E		D	Nelson W Angang	Wong You Fong	Vacant
Vacant	Putrajaya	Kuala Lumpur	E		D	Salehuddin Saidin	Mohd Zaini Salleh	Vacant
Labuan	Edward Linggu Bukut (Sabah)	Bobbey Ah Fang Suan (Sabah)	E		D	Pele Peter Tinggom	Niran Tan Kran	Vacant
Isaiah D. Jacob (Kuala Lumpur)	Michael Mujah Lihan (Sarawak)	Ahmad Ibrahim (Sarawak)	F		C	Mohd Hatta Ramli	Anna Bell @ Suzieana Perian	Vacant
Vacant	Noor Inayah Ya'akub (Penang)	Lingeshwaran Arunasalam (Penang)	F		C	Mohd Hasbie Muda	Abun Sui Anyit	Vacant
Vacant	Vacant (Malacca)	Koh Nai Kwong (Malacca)	F		C	Awang Sariyan	Saraswathy Kandasami	Vacant
Vacant	Ng Keng Heng (Johor)	Abdul Halim Suleiman (Johor)	F	the Mace	C	Low Kian Chuan	Mohd Na'im Mokhtar	Vacant
Vacant	Shahrol Wizan Sulong (Pahang)	Norhasmimi Abdul Ghani (Pahang)	G		B	Vacant	Vacant	Vacant
Vacant	Musoddak Ahmad (Kedah)	Abdul Nasir Idris (Kedah)	G		B	Vacant	Vacant	Vacant
Vacant	Mohamad Hairul Amir Sabri (Perak)	Shamsuddin Abd Ghaffar (Perak)	G		B	Robert Lau Hui Yew	Marhamah Rosli (Deputy Minister)	Vacant
Vacant	Nik Mohamad Abduh; Nik Abdul Aziz (Kelantan)	Wan Martina Wan Yusoff (Kelantan)	G		B	Rita Sarimah Patrick Insol	Fuziah Salleh (Deputy Minister)	Vacant
Vacant	Wu Him Ven (Negeri Sembilan)	Jufitri Joha (Negeri Sembilan)	H		A	Nur Jazlan Mohamed (Deputy President)	Zulkifli Hasan (Minister)	Vacant
Vacant	Tiew Way Keng (Selangor)	Mohammad Redzuan Othman (Selangor)	H		A	P194 Petra Jaya (Deputy Prime Minister)	Amir Hamzah Azizan (Minister)	Vacant
Vacant	Azahar Hassan (Perlis)	Baharuddin Ahmad (Perlis)	H		A	P075 Bagan Datuk (Deputy Prime Minister)	Zambry Abd Kadir (Minister)	Vacant
Vacant	Che Alias Hamid (Terengganu)	Hussin Ismail (Terengganu)	H	Secretary	A	P063 Tambun (Prime Minister)	Saifuddin Nasution Ismail (Minister)	Vacant
				Awang Bemee Awang Ali Basah (President)

- The seating arrangement is viewable at the official website of the Parliament.

== Incumbent members ==
Senator	Party	State	Term	Term start	Term end	Remarks
=== Elected by State Legislative Assemblies ===
PN 8 | BN 6 | PH 7 | GPS 2 | GRS 1 | STAR 1 | VAC 1 (Malacca)
Abdul Halim Suleiman	BN (UMNO)	Johor	First	23 November 2023	22 November 2026	MLA for Tiram
Abd Nasir Idris	PN (PAS)	Kedah	Second	20 March 2026	19 March 2029	
Ahmad Ibrahim	GPS (PBB)	Sarawak	Second	22 July 2025	21 July 2028	
Azahar Hassan	PN (WAWASAN)	Perlis	First	10 September 2024	9 September 2027	
Baharuddin Ahmad	PN (PAS)	Perlis	First	10 September 2024	9 September 2027	
Bobbey Ah Fang Suan	GRS (GAGASAN)	Sabah	Second	5 January 2024	4 January 2027	
Che Alias Hamid	PN (PAS)	Terengganu	First	21 November 2024	20 November 2027	
Edward Linggu Bukut	STAR	Sabah	First	9 December 2024	8 December 2027	
Hussin Ismail	PN (PAS)	Terengganu	Second	23 April 2026	22 April 2029	
Jufitri Joha	PH (PKR)	Negeri Sembilan	First	25 August 2025	24 August 2028	
Koh Nai Kwong	BN (MCA)	Malacca	Second	6 March 2024	5 March 2027	
Lingeshwaran Arunasalam	PH (DAP)	Penang	Second	14 May 2026	13 May 2029	
Michael Mujah Lihan	GPS (PBB)	Sarawak	Second	11 December 2026	10 December 2029	
Mohamad Hairul Amir Sabri	PH (PKR)	Perak	First	10 September 2026	9 September 2029	
Mohammad Redzuan Othman	PH (PKR)	Selangor	First	26 February 2025	25 February 2028	
Musoddak Ahmad	PN (PAS)	Kedah	Second	20 March 2026	19 March 2029	
Ng Keng Heng	BN (MCA)	Johor	First	11 September 2025	10 September 2028	
Nik Mohamad Abduh Nik Abdul Aziz	PN (PAS)	Kelantan	Second	8 July 2026	7 July 2029	
Noor Inayah Ya'akub	PH (PKR)	Penang	First	14 May 2026	13 May 2029	
Norhasmimi Abdul Ghani	BN (UMNO)	Pahang	First	13 May 2025	12 May 2028	
Shahrol Wizan Sulong	BN (UMNO)	Pahang	First	13 May 2025	12 May 2028	
Shamsuddin Abd Ghaffar	BN (UMNO)	Perak	Second	20 December 2024	19 December 2027	
Tiew Way Keng	PH (DAP)	Selangor	First	26 February 2025	25 February 2028	
Wan Martina Wan Yusoff	PN (PAS)	Kelantan	Second	24 August 2024	23 August 2027	
Wu Him Ven	PH (DAP)	Negeri Sembilan	First	25 August 2025	24 August 2028	
=== Appointed by the King of Malaysia ===
PH 13 | IND 7 | BN 5 | GPS 4 | GRS 2 | VAC 13
Abun Sui Anyit	PH (PKR)	At-large	Second	20 March 2026	19 March 2029	
Amir Hamzah Azizan	Independent	At-large	First	12 December 2023	11 December 2026	Minister of Finance II
Anna Bell @ Suzieana Perian	GRS (GAGASAN)	At-large	First	5 March 2024	4 March 2027	
Awang Bemee Awang Ali Basah	GPS (PBB)	At-large	First	15 July 2024	14 July 2027	President of the Dewan Negara
Awang Sariyan	Independent	At-large	Second	20 March 2026	19 March 2029	
Fuziah Salleh	PH (PKR)	At-large	Second	10 December 2025	9 December 2028	Deputy Minister of Domestic Trade and Cost of Living
Isaiah D Jacob	PH (PKR)	Kuala Lumpur	Second	20 March 2026	19 March 2029	
Larry Asap	PH (DAP)	At-large	First	10 May 2026	9 May 2029	
Leong Ngah Ngah	PH (DAP)	At-large	First	25 August 2025	24 August 2028	
Low Kian Chuan	Independent	At-large	Second	20 March 2026	19 March 2029	
Marhamah Rosli	Independent	At-large	First	16 December 2025	15 December 2028	Deputy Minister in the Prime Minister's Department (Religious Affairs)
Mohamad Zaini Salleh	BN (UMNO)	At-large	First	10 May 2026	9 May 2029	
Mohd Hasbie Muda	PH (AMANAH)	At-large	Second	20 March 2026	19 March 2029	
Mohd Hatta Ramli	PH (AMANAH)	At-large	Second	20 March 2026	19 March 2029	
Mohd Na'im Mokhtar	Independent	At-large	Second	3 December 2025	2 December 2028	
Nelson W Angang	GRS (UPKO)	At-large	First	16 May 2024	15 May 2027	
Niran Tan Kran	PH (PKR)	Siamese	First	24 September 2025	23 September 2028	
Nur Jazlan Mohamed	BN (UMNO)	At-large	Second	15 June 2026	14 June 2029	Deputy President of the Dewan Negara
Pele Peter Tinggom	GPS (PDP)	At-large	First	5 March 2024	4 March 2027	
Phoong Jin Zhe	PH (DAP)	At-large	First	10 May 2026	9 May 2029	
Rita Sarimah Patrick Insol	GPS (PRS)	At-large	Second	20 November 2023	19 November 2026	Standing Orders Committee Member
Robert Lau Hui Yew	GPS (SUPP)	At-large	Second	16 May 2024	15 May 2027	
Rosni Sohar	BN (UMNO)	At-large	First	9 January 2025	8 January 2028	
Saifuddin Nasution Ismail	PH (PKR)	At-large	Second	3 December 2025	2 December 2028	Minister of Home Affairs
Salehuddin Saidin	Independent	At-large	First	22 July 2024	21 July 2027	
Saraswathy Kandasami	PH (PKR)	At-large	Second	10 December 2025	9 December 2028	
Sheikh Umar Bagharib Ali	PH (DAP)	At-large	First	10 May 2026	9 May 2029	
Thiagarajah Rajagopal	PH (DAP)	At-large	First	10 May 2026	9 May 2029	
Wong You Fong	BN (MCA)	At-large	First	10 May 2026	9 May 2029	
Zambry Abdul Kadir	BN (UMNO)	At-large	Second	3 December 2025	2 December 2028	Minister of Higher Education
Zulkifli Hasan	Independent	At-large	First	12 December 2023	11 December 2026	Minister in the Prime Minister's Department (Religious Affairs)

== Former members ==
Senator	Party	Representing	Term	Term start	Term end
Mohd Radzi Sheikh Ahmad (Note: Resigned in order to be nominated as the Speaker of Dewan Rakyat.)	PN (BERSATU)	At-large	First	16 June 2020	18 December 2022
Ahmad Masrizal Muhammad	BN (UMNO)	At-large	First	9 March 2020	8 March 2023
Zulkifli Mohamad Al-Bakri	Independent	At-large	First	9 March 2020	8 March 2023
Mohamad Ali Mohamad	BN (UMNO)	Malacca	First	20 May 2020	19 May 2023
Ras Adiba Radzi	Independent	PWD	First	20 May 2020	19 May 2023
Balasubramaniam Nachiappan	PN (PAS)	At-large	First	16 June 2020	15 June 2023
Muhammad Zahid Md. Arip	PN (BERSATU)	Kuala Lumpur	First	16 June 2020	15 June 2023
Rais Yatim	PN (BERSATU)	At-large	First	16 June 2020	15 June 2023
Mohd Apandi Mohamad	PN (PAS)	Kelantan	First	8 July 2020	7 July 2023
Jefridin Atan	BN (UMNO)	Johor	First	13 September 2020	12 September 2023
Ak Nan Eh Took	PN (BERSATU)	Siamese	Second	1 December 2020	30 November 2023
Nuing Jeluing	GPS (PBB)	Sarawak	Second	11 December 2020	10 December 2023
Paul Igai	GPS (PDP)	At-large	Second	16 December 2020	15 December 2023
Jaziri Alkaf Abdillah Suffian	PN (BERSATU)	At-large	First	21 December 2020	20 December 2023
John Ambrose	GRS (GAGASAN)	At-large	Second	16 January 2021	15 January 2024
Wan Junaidi Tuanku Jaafar (Note: Resigned in order to be appointed as the Yang di-Pertua Negeri of Sarawak.)	GPS (PBB)	At-large	First	15 June 2023	18 January 2024
Mutang Tagal (Note: Died in office.)	GPS (PBB)	At-large	First	15 February 2024	10 May 2024
Teo Eng Tee @ Teo Kok Chee	PN (GERAKAN)	At-large	Second	19 July 2021	18 July 2024
Ti Lian Ker	BN (MCA)	At-large	Second	10 August 2021	9 August 2024
Ajis Sitin	BN (UMNO)	Pahang	First	25 August 2021	24 August 2024
Juhanis Abdul Aziz	BN (UMNO)	Pahang	First	25 August 2021	24 August 2024
Aziz Ariffin	BN (UMNO)	Perlis	First	26 August 2021	25 August 2024
Seruandi Saad	BN (UMNO)	Perlis	First	26 August 2021	25 August 2024
Md Nasir Hashim	PN (BERSATU)	At-large	Second	27 August 2021	26 August 2024
Razali Idris	PN (BERSATU)	At-large	Second	27 August 2021	26 August 2024
Husain Awang	PN (PAS)	Terengganu	Second	15 September 2021	14 September 2024
Mohd Hisamudin Yahaya	BN (UMNO)	Putrajaya	First	4 October 2021	3 October 2024
Arman Azha Abu Hanifah	BN (UMNO)	At-large	First	26 October 2021	25 October 2024
Dominic Lau Hoe Chai	PN (GERAKAN)	At-large	First	23 November 2021	22 November 2024
Nelson Renganathan	BN (MIC)	At-large	First	23 November 2021	22 November 2024
Noraini Idris	BN (UMNO)	Sabah	First	10 December 2021	9 December 2024
Zurainah Musa	BN (UMNO)	At-large	First	22 December 2021	21 December 2024
Azhar Ahmad	BN (UMNO)	At-large	First	21 March 2022	20 March 2025
Kesavadas Achyuthan Nair	PH (DAP)	Negeri Sembilan	Second	25 April 2022	24 April 2025
Mohamad Fatmi Che Salleh	BN (UMNO)	At-large	First	25 April 2022	24 April 2025
Lim Pay Hen	BN (MCA)	Johor	Second	26 June 2022	25 June 2025
Ahmad Azam Hamzah	PH (PKR)	Negeri Sembilan	Second	15 August 2022	14 August 2025
Mohamed Haniffa Abdullah	BN (MIC)	At-large	First	26 September 2022	25 September 2025
Ros Suryati Alang	BN (UMNO)	At-large	First	26 September 2022	25 September 2025
Tengku Zafrul Tengku Abdul Aziz	PH (PKR)	At-large	Second	3 December 2022	2 December 2025
Amir Md Ghazali	PH (PKR)	Penang	First	7 March 2023	6 March 2026
Anifah Aman	GRS (PCS)	Labuan	First	20 March 2023	19 March 2026
Manolan Mohamad	PH (PKR)	Aborigines	Second	20 March 2023	19 March 2026
Noorita Sual	PH (DAP)	At-large	First	20 March 2023	19 March 2026
Roderick Wong Siew Lead	PH (DAP)	At-large	First	20 March 2023	19 March 2026
Sivaraj Chandran	BN (MIC)	At-large	First	20 March 2023	19 March 2026
Mujahid Yusof Rawa	PH (AMANAH)	Perak	First	25 May 2023	24 May 2026
Mustafa Musa	BN (UMNO)	Malacca	First	31 July 2023	30 July 2026
Susan Chemerai Anding	GPS (PBB)	At-large	Second	21 August 2023	20 August 2026
Vell Paari Samy Vellu	BN (MIC)	At-large	Second	2 September 2023	1 September 2026
