= Asojan Muniyandy =

Malaysian politician (born 1965)

Yang Berbahagia Datuk Asojan Muniyandy DPSM AMN
- அசோஜன் முனியாண்டி

Vice-President of the Malaysian Indian Congress
- Incumbent
- Assumed office 27 November 2021 Serving with Murugiah Thopasamy; Nelson Renganathan (since 2024); Vell Paari Samy Vellu (since 2024); Ramasamy Muthusamy (since 2024)
- President: Vigneswaran Sanasee
- Deputy President: Saravanan Murugan
- Preceded by: Sivarraajh Chandran

Secretary-General of the Malaysian Indian Congress
- In office 20 October 2018 – 27 November 2021
- Preceded by: A. Sakthivel

State Chairman of the MIC Liaison Body of Johor
- Incumbent
- Assumed office 22 November 2016
- Preceded by: S. Balakhrishnan

Member of the Johor State Legislative Assembly for Gambir
- In office 21 March 2004 – 9 May 2018
- Preceded by: new constituency
- Succeeded by: Muhyiddin Yassin (PH–BERSATU)
- Majority: 6,109 (2004); 2,463 (2008); 310 (2013)

Personal details
- Born: Asojan a/l Muniyandy; 20 December 1965 (age 60) Malacca, Malaysia
- Party: Malaysian Indian Congress (MIC)
- Spouse: M. Manimala
- Occupation: Politician

Asojan s/o Muniyandy (born 20 December 1965) is a Malaysian politician who served as vice-president of the Malaysian Indian Congress (MIC) since November 2021 as well as State Chairman of the MIC Liaison Body of Johor since November 2016. He also served as Member of the Johor State Legislative Assembly (MLA) for Gambir from March 2004 to May 2018. He is a member of Malaysian Indian Congress (MIC), a component party of Barisan Nasional (BN) coalitions.

== Political career ==
Asojan Muniyandy was elected as Gambir assemblyman from March 2004 to May 2018.

At party level, he was elected as vice-president of the MIC on 27 November 2021. He was reelected in 2024.

== Election results ==
Johor State Legislative Assembly
| Year | Constituency | Candidate | Votes | Pct | Opponent(s) | Votes | Pct | Ballots cast | Majority | Turnout |
|---|---|---|---|---|---|---|---|---|---|---|
| 2004 | N09 Gambir | Asojan Muniyandy (MIC) | 9,690 | 73.02% | Aripin Dahalan (PAS) | 3,581 | 26.98% | 13,656 | 6,109 | 73.83% |
| 2008 | N09 Gambir | Asojan Muniyandy (MIC) | 8,190 | 58.85% | Kassim Ibrahim (PAS) | 5,727 | 41.15% | 14,434 | 2,463 | 77.09% |
| 2013 | N09 Gambir | Asojan Muniyandy (MIC) | 8,705 | 47.83% | Mahfodz Mohamed (PAS) | 8,395 | 46.13% | 18,690 | 310 | 87.41% |
| 2013 | N09 Gambir | Asojan Muniyandy (MIC) | 8,705 | 47.83% | Mohd Zan Abu (IND) | 837 | 4.60% | 18,690 | 310 | 87.41% |
| 2013 | N09 Gambir | Asojan Muniyandy (MIC) | 8,705 | 47.83% | Yunus Mustakim (IND) | 261 | 1.43% | 18,690 | 310 | 87.41% |
| 2018 | N09 Gambir | Asojan Muniyandy (MIC) | 7,192 | 37.31% | Muhyiddin Yassin (BERSATU) | 10,280 | 53.33% | 19,278 | 3,088 | 84.83% |
| 2018 | N09 Gambir | Asojan Muniyandy (MIC) | 7,192 | 37.31% | Mahfodz Mohamed (PAS) | 1,806 | 5.63% | 19,278 | 3,088 | 84.83% |

== Honours ==
- Malaysia
  - Member of the Order of the Defender of the Realm (AMN) (2011)
- Malacca
  - Companion Class II of the Exalted Order of Malacca (DPSM) – Datuk (2014)
