= Kesavadas Achyuthan Nair =

Malaysian politician

Yang Berbahagia Dato' Kesavadas Achyuthan Nair DIMP

Senator

Elected by the Negeri Sembilan State Legislative Assembly
- In office 25 April 2022 – 24 April 2025 Serving with Ahmad Azam Hamzah
- Monarchs: Abdullah (2022–2024); Ibrahim (2024–2025)
- Prime Minister: Ismail Sabri Yaakob (2022); Anwar Ibrahim (2022–2025)
- Preceded by: Himself
- Succeeded by: Vincent Wu Him Ven
- In office 20 March 2019 – 19 March 2022 Serving with Ahmad Azam Hamzah
- Monarch: Abdullah
- Prime Minister: Mahathir Mohamad (2019–2020); Muhyiddin Yassin (2020–2021); Ismail Sabri Yaakob (2021–2022)
- Preceded by: Chong Sin Woon
- Succeeded by: Himself

State Vice Chairman of the Democratic Action Party of Negeri Sembilan
- In office October 2018 – 29 September 2024 Serving with Teo Kok Seong
- Secretary-General: Lim Guan Eng (2021–2022); Anthony Loke Siew Fook (2022–2024)
- State Chairman: Anthony Loke Siew Fook
- Succeeded by: Arul Kumar Jambunathan

Personal details
- Born: Kesavadas a/l Achyuthan Nair; 11 June 1959 (age 67) Klang, Selangor, Federation of Malaya
- Party: Democratic Action Party (DAP)
- Other political affiliations: Pakatan Harapan (PH)
- Education: University of London (LLB); University of Malaya (CLP)
- Occupation: Politician
- Profession: Lawyer

Kesavadas s/o A. Achyuthan Nair is a Malaysian politician and lawyer who has served as a Senator representing Negeri Sembilan from May 2019 to May 2022 and again from April 2022 to April 2025. He is a member of the Democratic Action Party (DAP), a component party of the Pakatan Harapan (PH) coalition.

== Career ==
Kesavadas is a lawyer and practicing under the law firm A.k. Das & Associates in Malacca.

At the party level, he was a state vice chairman of DAP of the Negeri Sembilan alongside Teo Kok Seong from 2018 until 2024.

On 20 March 2019, Kesavadas was elected to the Parliament as a Senator representing Negeri Sembilan for the first term after being nominated and approved by the Negeri Sembilan State Legislative Assembly. On 19 March 2022, his first 3-year term ended. On 25 April 2022, he was reelected as Senator for the second term after being renominated and reapproved by the assembly.

Kesavadas also discussed the establishment of a Royal Commission of Inquiry regarding the cartel of non-halal imported meat that was detected in 2020 and the government has agreed to set up the commission.

== Honours ==
- Malaysia
  - Recipient of the 17th Yang di-Pertuan Agong Installation Medal (2025)
- Pahang
  - Knight Companion of the Order of the Crown of Pahang (DIMP) – Dato' (2014)

== See also ==
- Members of the Dewan Negara, 14th Malaysian Parliament
- Members of the Dewan Negara, 15th Malaysian Parliament
