= Ahmad Azam Hamzah =

Malaysian politician and physician

Yang Berbahagia Dato' Ahmad Azam Hamzah DBNS
- أحمد عزام حمزة

Senator

Elected by the Negeri Sembilan State Legislative Assembly
- In office 15 August 2022 – 14 August 2025 Serving with Kesavadas Achyuthan Nair
- Monarchs: Abdullah (2022–2024); Ibrahim (2024–2025)
- Prime Minister: Ismail Sabri Yaakob (2022); Anwar Ibrahim (2022–2025)
- Preceded by: Himself
- Succeeded by: Jufitri Joha
- In office 9 May 2019 – 8 May 2022 Serving with Kesavadas Achyuthan Nair
- Monarch: Abdullah
- Prime Minister: Mahathir Mohamad (2019–2020); Muhyiddin Yassin (2020–2021); Ismail Sabri Yaakob (2021–2022)
- Preceded by: Salim Sharif
- Succeeded by: Himself

Personal details
- Born: Ahmad Azam bin Hamzah; 1961 (age 64–65) Kemaman, Terengganu, Federation of Malaya
- Party: People's Justice Party (PKR)
- Other political affiliations: Pakatan Harapan (PH)
- Education: Universiti Pertanian Malaysia (PhD)
- Occupation: Politician
- Profession: Veterinarian

Ahmad Azam bin Hamzah (born 1961) is a Malaysian politician and veterinarian who served as a Senator representing Negeri Sembilan from May 2019 to May 2022 and again from August 2022 to August 2025. He is a member of the People's Justice Party (PKR), a component party of the Pakatan Harapan (PH) coalition.

== Career ==
Ahmad Azam holds a Doctor of Philosophy (PhD) degree in Veterinary medicine from Universiti Pertanian Malaysia (UPM). He was the Negeri Sembilan Pakatan Harapan election director in 2018.

On 9 May 2019, Ahmad Azam was elected to the Parliament as a Senator representing Negeri Sembilan for the first term after being nominated and approved by the Negeri Sembilan State Legislative Assembly. On 8 May 2022, his first 3-year term ended. On 15 August 2022, he was reelected as a Senator for the second term after being renominated and reapproved by the assembly.

== Honours ==
- Malaysia
  - Recipient of the 17th Yang di-Pertuan Agong Installation Medal (2025)
- Negeri Sembilan
  - Knight of the Order of Loyal Service to Negeri Sembilan (DBNS) – Dato' (2022)

== See also ==
- Members of the Dewan Negara, 14th Malaysian Parliament
- Members of the Dewan Negara, 15th Malaysian Parliament
