= Sahrihan Jani =

Malaysian politician

Yang Berhormat Sahrihan Jani MLA
- ساهريهان جاني

Member of the Johor State Legislative Assembly for Gambir
- Incumbent
- Assumed office 2022
- Preceded by: Muhyiddin Yassin

Personal details
- Born: Sahrihan bin Jani
- Citizenship: Malaysian
- Party: United Malays National Organisation (UMNO)
- Occupation: Politician

Sahrihan bin Jani is a Malaysian politician from United Malays National Organisation (UMNO). He has served as the Member of the Johor State Legislative Assembly for Gambir since 2022.

== Election results ==
Johor State Legislative Assembly
Year	Constituency	Candidate	Votes	Pct.	Opponent(s)	Votes	Pct.	Ballots cast	Majority	Turnout
2022	N09 Gambir	Sahrihan Jani (UMNO)	7,960	45.48%	Mohd Solihan Badri (BERSATU)	4,814	27.50%	18,053	3,146	61.33%
2022	N09 Gambir	Sahrihan Jani (UMNO)	7,960	45.48%	Naim Jusri (PKR)	4,509	25.76%	18,053	3,146	61.33%
2022	N09 Gambir	Sahrihan Jani (UMNO)	7,960	45.48%	Suraya Sulaiman (PEJUANG)	220	1.26%	18,053	3,146	61.33%
2026	N09 Gambir	Sahrihan Jani (UMNO)	13,427	61.01%	Mohd Nor Mohd Yusof (PKR)	6,693	30.41%	22,008	6,734	73.35%
2026	N09 Gambir	Sahrihan Jani (UMNO)	13,427	61.01%	Suraya Sulaiman (PEJUANG)	1,888	8.58%	22,008	6,734	73.35%
