= 15th Malaysian Parliament =

15th Malaysian Parliament may refer to:

- Members of the Dewan Negara, 15th Malaysian Parliament
- Members of the Dewan Rakyat, 15th Malaysian Parliament
