= Lim Pay Hen =

Malaysian politician

Yang Berbahagia Datuk Lim Pay Hen DPSM JMN PPN
- 林培兴

Senator

Elected by the Johor State Legislative Assembly
- In office 26 June 2022 – 25 June 2025 Serving with Jefridin Atan (2022–2023); Abdul Halim Suleiman (2023–2025)
- Monarchs: Abdullah (2022–2024); Ibrahim (2024–2025)
- Prime Minister: Ismail Sabri Yaakob (2022); Anwar Ibrahim (2022–2025)
- Preceded by: himself
- Succeeded by: Wong You Fong
- In office 4 December 2017 – 3 December 2020 Serving with Zahari Sarip (2017–2020); Jefridin Atan (2020)
- Monarchs: Muhammad V (2017–2019); Abdullah (2019–2020)
- Prime Minister: Najib Razak (2017–2018); Mahathir Mohamad (2018–2020); Muhyiddin Yassin (2020)
- Preceded by: Chia Song Cheng
- Succeeded by: himself

Deputy State Chairman of the Malaysian Chinese Association of Johor
- President: Wee Ka Siong
- Deputy President: Mah Hang Soon
- Secretary-General: Chew Mei Fun (2018–2019); Chong Sin Woon (since 2019)
- State Chairman: Wee Ka Siong
- State Secretary: Ng Keng Heng
- Preceded by: Jason Teoh
- Succeeded by: Ling Tian Soon

Division Chief of Pagoh of the Malaysian Chinese Association
- President: Wee Ka Siong
- Deputy President: Mah Hang Soon
- Secretary-General: Chew Mei Fun (2018–2019); Chong Sin Woon (since 2019)
- State Chairman: Wee Ka Siong

Personal details
- Born: 1957 (age 68–69) Jementah, Segamat, Johor, Malaysia
- Party: Malaysian Chinese Association (MCA)
- Other political affiliations: Barisan Nasional (BN)
- Occupation: Politician
- Profession: Teacher

Lim Pay Hen (born 1957) is a Malaysian politician who served as a Senator from 2017 until 2020 and was elected again for a second term from June 2022 until June 2025 by the Johor State Legislative Assembly. He is a member of the Malaysian Chinese Association (MCA), a component party of the Barisan Nasional (BN) coalition.

== Political career ==
He is the former Deputy Chairman of the Liaison Committee of Malaysian Chinese Association (MCA) of Johor from 2018 to 2023. Apart from that, he is the Head of Pagoh MCA Division.

He was appointed as the Special Officer to former Deputy Prime Minister of Malaysia Muhyiddin Yassin from 2009 to 2015. He was also a member of the Tangkak District Council for 10 years.

== Honours ==
- Malaysia:
  - Companion of the Order of the Defender of the Realm (JMN) (2010)
  - Medal of the Order of the Defender of the Realm (PPN) (2008)
  - Recipient of the 17th Yang di-Pertuan Agong Installation Medal (2025)
- Malacca:
  - Companion Class II of the Exalted Order of Malacca (DPSM) – Datuk (2014)
