= Mohd Solihan Badri =

Malaysian politician

Haji Mohd Solihan Badri
- محمد صالحان بن بدري

Exco roles (Johor)
- 2019–2022: Chairman of the Public Works, Infrastructure and Transportation

Faction represented in Johor State Legislative Assembly
- 2018–2020: Pakatan Harapan
- 2020: Malaysian United Indigenous Party
- 2020–2022: Perikatan Nasional

Personal details
- Born: Johor, Malaysia
- Citizenship: Malaysian
- Party: Malaysian United Indigenous Party (BERSATU)
- Other political affiliations: Pakatan Harapan (PH) (2018-2020); Perikatan Nasional (PN) (since 2020); Barisan Nasional (BN) (aligned:since 2020)
- Occupation: Politician

Mohd Solihan bin Badri is a Malaysian politician who has served as Member of the Johor State Executive Council (EXCO) in the Barisan Nasional (BN) and Pakatan Harapan (PH) state administrations under former Menteris Besar Hasni Mohammad and Sahruddin Jamal from March 2020 to March 2022 and from April 2019 to the collapse of the PH state administration in February 2020. He served as Member of the Johor State Legislative Assembly (MLA) for Tenang from May 2018 to March 2022. He is a member of the Malaysian United Indigenous Party (BERSATU), a component party of the ruling Perikatan Nasional (PN) coalition which is aligned with BN coalition and a former component party of the PH opposition coalition.

== Election results ==
Johor State Legislative Assembly
Year	Constituency	Candidate	Votes	Pct	Opponent(s)	Votes	Pct	Ballots cast	Majority	Turnout
2018	Tenang	Mohd Solihan Badri (BERSATU)	7,645	50.92%	Mohd Azahar Ibrahim (UMNO)	6,575	43.79%	15,270	1,070	83.00%
2018	Tenang	Mohd Solihan Badri (BERSATU)	7,645	50.92%	Nasharudin Awang (PAS)	794	5.29%	15,270	1,070	83.00%
2022	Gambir	Mohd Solihan Badri (BERSATU)	4,814	27.50%	Shahrihan Jani (UMNO)	7,960	45.48%	17,503	3,146	59.47%
2022	Gambir	Mohd Solihan Badri (BERSATU)	4,814	27.50%	Naim Jusri (PKR)	4,509	25.76%	17,503	3,146	59.47%
2022	Gambir	Mohd Solihan Badri (BERSATU)	4,814	27.50%	Suraya Sulaiman (PEJUANG)	220	1.26%	17,503	3,146	59.47%
