= Najwa Mahiaddin =

Malaysian singer, songwriter and record producer (born 1986)

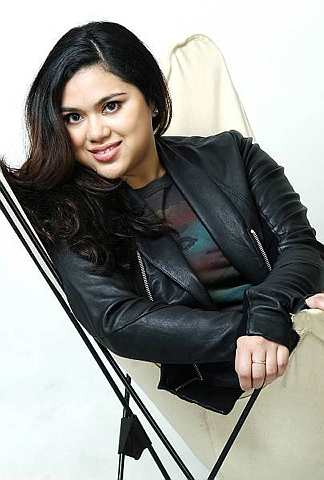
- Born: Najwa binti Mahiaddin; 26 April 1986 (age 40); Kuala Lumpur, Malaysia
- Other name: NJWA
- Occupations: Singer; songwriter; record producer
- Years active: 2008–present
- Spouse: Idris Koh Keng Hui (m. 2015)
- Parent(s): Muhyiddin Yassin; Noorainee Abdul Rahman
- Musical career
- Genres: Alternative; R&B; soul
- Instruments: Vocals; piano
- Label: Nada Biru Muzik

Najwa binti Mahiaddin (born 26 April 1986) is a Malaysian singer, songwriter and record producer.

Najwa also uses the stage name NJWA. In addition, she is the daughter of the 8th Prime Minister of Malaysia, Tan Sri Muhyiddin Yassin. Throughout her career, she has received recognition for Best New Artist and Best Local English Song at the 18th Music Industry Awards.

== Early life and education ==
From a young age, Najwa loved singing. However, her parents thought it would be wiser for her to pursue a different field than music. Therefore, Najwa studied electronics at the University of Melbourne. At university, she also participated in student singing competitions. On the advice of a friend, Najwa recorded a few songs and posted them on a Myspace page. During her school holidays, she became familiar with the Malaysian music scene. She decided not to continue with electronics and instead pursued a music degree at the International College Of Music (ICOM), in Kuala Lumpur. In 2011, Najwa continued her studies at Berklee College of Music, Boston.

== Career ==
As her stage name, Najwa chose the name 'Mahiaddin' instead of her real name 'Muhyiddin', so that people would not immediately associate her with her father and accuse her of having a privileged position in the entertainment industry. She subsequently performed at the Malaysian music festivals Youth '09 and No Black Tie. In 2008, Najwa appeared on rapper Malique Ibrahim's debut album OK, on which she sings the chorus of the song Kau Yang Punya, a song based on The Roots' song You Got Me. In early 2011, Najwa's debut album, Innocent Soul, was released. The album is entirely in English. At the eighteenth edition of the Malaysian music festival Anugerah Industri Muzik, Najwa won the awards for Best Newcomer and Best English-language Song (Got To Go).

== Personal life ==
She married Idris Koh Keng Hui, who is of Malaysian Chinese descent, on 26 March 2015 at the official residence of the Deputy Prime Minister of Malaysia, Sri Satria. The couple have a daughter, who was born in 2021.

== Discography ==
=== Studio albums ===
- Innocent Soul (2011)

=== EPs ===
- Aurora (2014)

=== Singles ===
Year	Song	Album
2011	"Got to Go"	Innocent Soul
2013	"Kau Yang Punya"	OK
2014	"Before"	Aurora
2015	"Seri Mersing"	Non-album singles
2015	"After The Rain"	Non-album singles
2015	"Sama Saja"	Non-album singles
2017	"Sentiasa Merinding"	Non-album singles
2018	"Ocean"	Non-album singles
2018	"Chinta"	Lagu Perang Bunyian Gamelan Malaysia
2019	"Take Love Back"	Non-album singles
2020	"Meikhtila"	Non-album singles
