= Nelson Renganathan =

Malaysian politician

Yang Berbahagia Dato' Nelson Renganathan DIMP
- நெல்சன் ரெங்கநாதன்

Vice-President of the Malaysian Indian Congress
- Incumbent
- Assumed office 2024 Serving with Murugiah Thopasamy; Vell Paari Samy Vellu (since 2024); Ramasamy Muthusamy (since 2024)
- President: Vigneswaran Sanasee
- Deputy President: Saravanan Murugan

Senator

Appointed by Yang di-Pertuan Agong
- In office 23 November 2021 – 22 November 2024
- Monarch: Abdullah
- Prime Minister: Ismail Sabri Yaakob (2021–2022); Anwar Ibrahim (2022–2024)

Personal details
- Born: Nelson a/l Renganathan; 29 May 1962 (age 64) Klang, Selangor, Federation of Malaya
- Party: Malaysian Indian Congress (MIC)
- Other political affiliations: Barisan Nasional (BN)
- Children: 3
- Education: Australian College of Applied Psychology (Bachelor degree of Applied Social Science in Counselling); University of Hull (MBA); La Jolla University (Doctor of Philosophy degree majoring in Human Behavior)
- Occupation: Politician, businessman

Nelson s/o Renganathan (born 29 May 1962) is a Malaysian politician who had served as a Senator from November 2021 to November 2024. He is currently the vice-president of the Malaysian Indian Congress (MIC), a component party of the Barisan Nasional (BN) coalition.

== Political career ==
Nelson was appointed as Senator along with GERAKAN president Dominic Lau Hoe Chai on 23 November 2021. He was later then elected as a vice-president of the Malaysian Indian Congress in 2024.

== Honours ==
- Pahang
  - Knight Companion of the Order of the Crown of Pahang (DIMP) – Dato' (1996)
