= Jufitri Joha =

Malaysian politician and activist (born 1979)

Yang Berhormat Senator Jufitri Joha
- جوفطري جوها

Senator

Elected by the Negeri Sembilan State Legislative Assembly
- Incumbent
- Assumed office 25 August 2025 Serving with Wu Him Ven
- Monarch: Ibrahim
- Prime Minister: Anwar Ibrahim
- Preceded by: Ahmad Azam Hamzah

President of the Malaysian Youth Council
- In office 2018–2022
- Preceded by: Mua’amar Ghadafi Jamal Jamaluddin
- Succeeded by: Mohd Izzat Afifi Abdul Hamid

Personal details
- Born: Jufitri bin Joha; 23 August 1979 (age 46) Rembau, Negeri Sembilan
- Party: People's Justice Party (PKR)
- Other political affiliations: Pakatan Harapan (PH)
- Spouse: Norazla Abd Wahab
- Children: 3
- Education: SMA Persekutuan Kajang
- Alma mater: International Islamic University Malaysia (LLB); Durham University (Master's); Universiti Putra Malaysia (PhD)
- Occupation: Politician
- Profession: Youth & social activist

Jufitri bin Joha (born 23 August 1979) is a Malaysian politician and activist who has served as a Senator representing Negeri Sembilan since August 2025. He is a member and Division Chief of Rembau of the People's Justice Party (PKR), a component party of the Pakatan Harapan (PH) coalition.

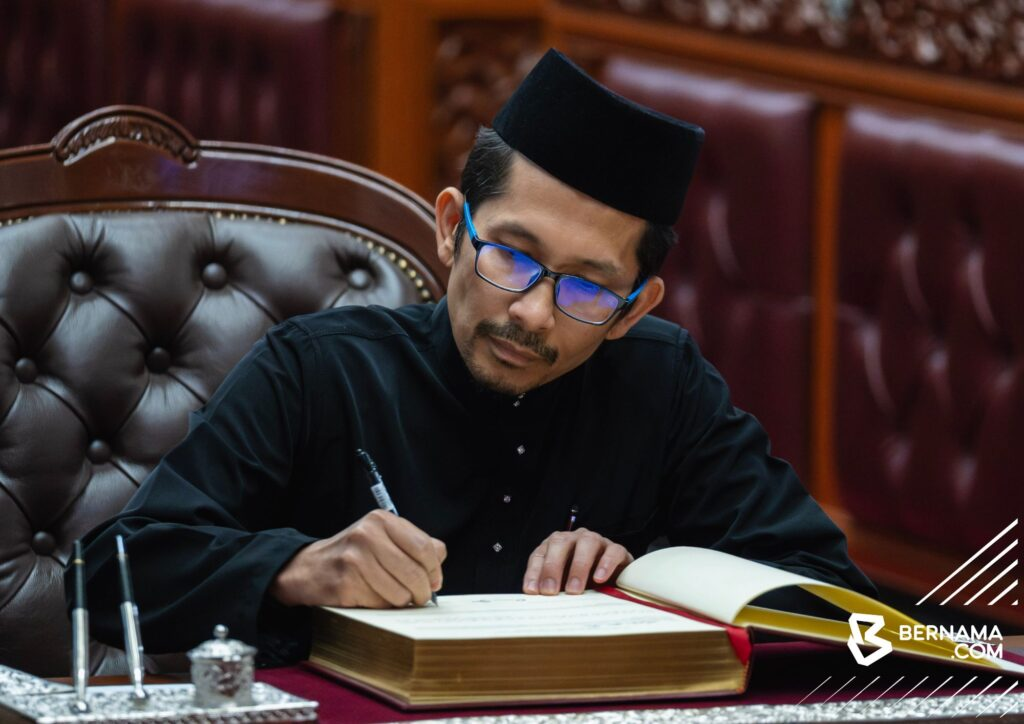
Signing his Senatorship oath.

== Election results ==
Parliament of Malaysia
Year	Constituency	Candidate	Votes	Pct	Opponent(s)	Votes	Pct	Ballots cast	Majority	Turnout
2022	P131 Rembau	Jufitri Joha (PKR)	33,178	30.32%	Mohamad Hasan (UMNO)	53,075	48.50%	109,436	19,897	81.94%
2022	P131 Rembau	Jufitri Joha (PKR)	33,178	30.32%	Mohd Nazree Mohd Yunus (BERSATU)	21,875	19.99%	109,436	19,897	81.94%
2022	P131 Rembau	Jufitri Joha (PKR)	33,178	30.32%	Tinagaram Subramaniam (PSM)	779	0.71%	109,436	19,897	81.94%
2022	P131 Rembau	Jufitri Joha (PKR)	33,178	30.32%	Ramly Awalludin (PEJUANG)	529	0.48%	109,436	19,897	81.94%

== See also ==
- Members of the Dewan Negara, 15th Malaysian Parliament
- List of International Islamic University Malaysia alumni
