= Gambir (state constituency) =

Political subdivision in Malaysia

Gambir (N09)
Johor constituency

State constituency
- Legislature: Johor State Legislative Assembly
MLA
Sahrihan Jani
BN
- Constituency created: 2003
- First contested: 2004
- Last contested: 2026

Demographics
- Population (2020): 39,049
- Electors (2026): 30,326
- Area (km²): 219

Gambir is a state constituency in Johor, Malaysia, that is represented in the Johor State Legislative Assembly.

The state constituency was first contested in 2004 and is mandated to return a single Assemblyman to the Johor State Legislative Assembly under the first-past-the-post voting system.

== Demographics ==
As of 2020, Gambir has a population of 39,049 people.

Ethnic breakdown of Gambir's electorate as of 2026
1. Malay (60.0%)
2. Chinese (35.7%)
3. Indian (3.70%)
4. Other ethnicities (0.60%)

== History ==
=== Polling districts ===
According to the gazette issued on 2 July 2026, the Gambir constituency has a total of 15 polling districts.

State constituency	Polling districts	Code	Location
Gambir（N09）	Kampung Babok	144/09/01	SJK (C) Kok Beng
Gambir（N09）	Sengkang	144/09/02	SK Sengkang
Gambir（N09）	Sawah Ring	144/09/03	SK Sawah Ring
Gambir（N09）	Bukit Gambir	144/09/04	SMK Bukit Gambir
Gambir（N09）	Parit Kassan	144/09/05	SK Parit Kassan
Gambir（N09）	Simpang Lima	144/09/06	SK Simpang 5 Pekan
Gambir（N09）	Parit Bilah	144/09/07	Balai Raya Kampung Sungai Bilah
Gambir（N09）	Pekan Bukit Gambir Barat	144/09/08	SK Bukit Gambir
Gambir（N09）	Pekan Bukit Gambir Timor	144/09/09	SA Bukit Gambir
Gambir（N09）	Pekan Bukit Gambir Utara	144/09/10	SJK (C) Chian Kuo
Gambir（N09）	Ladang Sagil	144/09/11	SJK (T) Ladang Sagil
Gambir（N09）	Bandar Sagil Luar	144/09/12	SJK (C) Chee Chuin
Gambir（N09）	Sagil	144/09/13	SK Sagil Kampong
Gambir（N09）	Kampong Sri Jaya	144/09/14	SK Serom 8
Gambir（N09）	Parit Zing	144/09/15	SJK (C) Khay Hian

=== Representation history ===
Members of the Legislative Assembly for Gambir
Assembly	No	Years	Member	Party
Constituency created from Serom and Tangkak
11th	N09	2004–2008	Asojan Muniyandy	BN (MIC)
12th	N09	2008–2013	Asojan Muniyandy	BN (MIC)
13th	N09	2013–2018	Asojan Muniyandy	BN (MIC)
14th	N09	2018–2020	Muhyiddin Yassin	PH (BERSATU)
14th	N09	2020–2022	Muhyiddin Yassin	PN (BERSATU)
15th	N09	2022–2026	Sahrihan Jani	BN (UMNO)
16th	N09	2026–present	Sahrihan Jani	BN (UMNO)

== Election results ==
Johor state election, 2026
Party	Candidate	Votes	%	∆%
BN	Sahrihan Jani	13,427	61.01	▲15.53
PH	Mohd Nor Mohd Yusof	6,693	30.41	▲30.41
PN	Suraya Sulaiman	1,888	8.58	▼18.92
Total valid votes		22,008	100.00	
Total rejected ballots		215		
Unreturned ballots		21		
Turnout		22,244	73.35	▲12.02
Registered electors		30,326		
Majority		6,734	30.60	▲12.62
BN hold		Swing		?

Johor state election, 2022
Party	Candidate	Votes	%	∆%
BN	Sahrihan Jani	7,960	45.48	▲7.14
PN	Mohd Solihan Badri	4,814	27.50	▲27.50
PKR	Naim Jusri	4,509	25.76	▼27.57
PEJUANG	Suraya Sulaiman	220	1.26	▲1.26
Total valid votes		17,503	100.00	
Total rejected ballots		305		
Unreturned ballots		245		
Turnout		18,053	61.33	
Registered electors		29,434		
Majority		3,416	17.98	
BN gain from PKR		Swing		?

Johor state election, 2018
Party	Candidate	Votes	%	∆%
PKR	Muhyiddin Yassin	10,280	53.33	▲53.33
BN	Asojan Muniyandy	7,192	37.31	▼10.53
PAS	Mahfodz Mohamed	1,806	9.37	▼36.96
Total valid votes		19,278	100.00	
Total rejected ballots		383		
Unreturned ballots		79		
Turnout		19,740	86.86	▼0.65
Registered electors		22,726		
Majority		3,088	16.02	▲14.31
PKR gain from BN		Swing		-

Johor state election, 2013
Party	Candidate	Votes	%	∆%
BN	Asojan Muniyandy	8,705	47.83	▼11.01
PAS	Mahfodz Mohamed	8,395	46.13	▲4.98
Independent	Mohd Zan Abu	837	4.60	▲4.60
Independent	Yunus Mustakim	261	1.43	▲1.43
Total valid votes		18,198	100.00	
Total rejected ballots		492		
Unreturned ballots		21		
Turnout		18,711	87.51	▲10.42
Registered electors		21,382		
Majority		310	1.70	▼15.99
BN hold		Swing		

Johor state election, 2008
Party	Candidate	Votes	%	∆%
BN	Asojan Muniyandy	8,190	58.85	▼14.17
PAS	Kasim Ibrahim	5,727	41.15	▲14.17
Total valid votes		13,917	100.00	
Total rejected ballots		499		
Unreturned ballots		18		
Turnout		14,434	77.09	▲3.26
Registered electors		18,724		
Majority		2,463	17.70	▼28.33
BN hold		Swing		

Johor state election, 2004
Party	Candidate	Votes	%
BN	Asojan Muniyandy	9,690	73.02
PAS	Aripin Dahalan	3,581	26.98
Total valid votes		13,271	100.00
Total rejected ballots		373	
Unreturned ballots		12	
Turnout		13,656	73.83
Registered electors		18,496	
Majority		6,109	46.03
This was a new constituency created.
