= Azhar Ahmad =

Malaysian Politician

Yang Berhormat Senator Datuk Azhar Ahmad
- أزهر أحمد

Senator Appointed by Yang di-Pertuan Agong
- Incumbent
- Assumed office 21 March 2022
- Monarchs: Abdullah (2022–2024); Ibrahim (since 2024)
- Prime Minister: Ismail Sabri Yaakob (2022); Anwar Ibrahim (since 2022)

Personal details
- Party: United Malays National Organisation (UMNO)
- Other political affiliations: Barisan Nasional (BN)

Azhar bin Ahmad is a Malaysian politician who has served a Senator appointed by the Yang di-Pertuan Agong since 21 March 2022. He is a member and the Division Chief of Beruas of the United Malays National Organisation (UMNO), a component party of the Barisan Nasional (BN) coalition.

He is also a Member of the Board of Directors of Pharmaniaga Berhad. Apart from that, he was once appointed as a Special Officer to the Menteri Besar of Perak, Zambry Abdul Kadir.

== Honours ==
- Malaysia
  - Recipient of the 17th Yang di-Pertuan Agong Installation Medal

== See also ==
- Members of the Dewan Negara, 15th Malaysian Parliament
