= Murugiah Thopasamy =

Malaysian politician

Yang Berbahagia Dato' Murugiah Thopasamy DPMP KMN AMP PPT

Vice-President of the Malaysian Indian Congress
- Incumbent
- Assumed office 2018 Serving with Mohan Thangarasu; Asojan Muniyandy; Vell Paari Samy Vellu; Kohilan Pillai Appu
- President: Vigneswaran Sanasee

Deputy Minister in the Prime Minister's Department
- In office 19 March 2008 – 15 May 2013

Personal details
- Born: Murugiah a/l Thopasamy
- Party: People's Progressive Party (PPP) (–2010); Malaysian Indian Congress (MIC) (2010–present)
- Other political affiliations: Barisan Nasional (BN)
- Occupation: Politician

Murugiah s/o Thopasamy is a Malaysian politician He served as Deputy Minister in the Prime Minister's Department from March 2008 to May 2013. He was a Senator from 2008 to 2013. He is member of Malaysian Indian Congress (MIC), a component party of Barisan Nasional (BN) and was a member of People's Progressive Party (PPP).

== Election results ==
Parliament of Malaysia
Year	Constituency	Candidate	Votes	Pct	Opponent(s)	Votes	Pct	Ballots cast	Majority	Turnout
2022	P076 Teluk Intan	Murugiah Thopasamy (MIC)	12,304	19.17%	Nga Kor Ming (DAP)	33,133	51.61%	65,128	15,169	73.60%
2022	P076 Teluk Intan	Murugiah Thopasamy (MIC)	12,304	19.17%	Zainol Fadzi Paharudin (BERSATU)	17,964	27.98%	65,128	15,169	73.60%
2022	P076 Teluk Intan	Murugiah Thopasamy (MIC)	12,304	19.17%	Ahmad Khusyairi Mohamad Tanusi (PEJUANG)	793	1.24%	65,128	15,169	73.60%

== Honours ==
- Malaysia
  - Officer of the Order of the Defender of the Realm (KMN) (2008)
- Perak
  - Knight Commander of the Order of the Perak State Crown (DPMP) – Dato' (2009)
  - Member of the Order of the Perak State Crown (AMP) (2000)
  - Recipient of the Distinguished Conduct Medal (PPT) (1997)
