= Lingeshwaran Arunasalam =

Malaysian politician

Yang Berhormat Senator Lingeshwaran Arunasalam

Senator

Elected by the Penang State Legislative Assembly
- Incumbent
- Assumed office 7 March 2023 Serving with Amir Md Ghazali
- Monarchs: Abdullah (2023–2024); Ibrahim (since 2024)
- Prime Minister: Anwar Ibrahim (since 2023)
- Preceded by: Lim Hui Ying

Personal details
- Party: Democratic Action Party (DAP)
- Other political affiliations: Pakatan Harapan (PH)
- Education: Royal College of Medicine Perak (MBBS)
- Occupation: Politician
- Profession: Physician

YB Senator Dr.Lingeshwaran Dato' Seri R. Arunasalam is a Malaysian politician and physician who has served as a Senator representing Penang since March 2023. He is a member of the Democratic Action Party (DAP), a component party of the Pakatan Harapan (PH) coalition.

== Background ==
YB Senator Dr.Lingeshwaran holds a Bachelor of Medicine and Bachelor of Surgery from the Royal College of Medicine in Perak and Master of Healthcare Administration from University of New South Wales also Master of Law from Taylor's University.

== Career ==
He was the Director of Sungai Bakap Hospital, Seberang Perai, Penang, appointed in August 2022 prior to his senatorship.

Lingeshwaran sworn in as Senator on 7 March 2023.

== Honours ==
- Malaysia :
  - Recipient of the 17th Yang di-Pertuan Agong Installation Medal
