= Ng Keng Heng =

Malaysian politician

Yang Berhormat Dato' Ng Keng Heng
- 黄卿兴

Malaysian Chinese Association MCA Johor State Treasurer
- President: Wee Ka Siong
- Deputy President: Mah Hang Soon
- Secretary General: Chong Sin Woon
- State Chairman: Wee Ka Siong
- State Deputy Chairman: Ling Tian Soon

Malaysian Chinese Association Kota Tinggi Division Chief
- President: Wee Ka Siong
- Deputy President: Mah Hang Soon
- Secretary General: Chong Sin Woon
- State Chairman: Wee Ka Siong
- State Deputy Chairman: Lim Pay Hen

Personal details
- Party: Barisan Nasional; Malaysian Chinese Association
- Occupation: Politician

Dato' Ng Keng Heng (Chinese: 黄卿兴) is Malaysian Chinese Association (MCA) member from Kota Tinggi, Johor, Malaysia. Ng Keng Heng is Malaysian Chinese Association Central Committee Member,Johor State Liaison Committee Treasurer and MCA Kota Tinggi Division Chief.
