= Amir Md Ghazali =

Malaysian politician

Yang Berhormat Senator Tuan Amir Md Ghazali
- أمير مد غزالي

Senator

Elected by the Penang State Legislative Assembly
- Incumbent
- Assumed office 7 March 2023 Serving with Lingeshwaran Arunasalam
- Monarchs: Abdullah (2023–2024); Ibrahim (since 2024)
- Prime Minister: Anwar Ibrahim
- Preceded by: Fadhlina Sidek

Director of Mobilisation of the People's Justice Party of Penang
- Incumbent
- Assumed office 2022
- President: Anwar Ibrahim
- State Chairman: Nurul Izzah Anwar

Personal details
- Born: 1972 (age 53–54)
- Party: People's Justice Party (PKR)
- Other political affiliations: Pakatan Harapan (PH)
- Occupation: Politician

Amir bin Md Ghazali (born 1972) is a Malaysian politician who has served as a Senator representing Penang since March 2023. He is a member of the People's Justice Party (PKR), a component party of the Pakatan Harapan (PH) coalition.

== Political career ==
Amir Md Ghazali served as Director of Mobilisation of PKR in Penang. He was sworn in as senator on 7 March 2023 along with Lingeshwaran Arunasalam. In 2025 party election, Amir Md Ghazali elected as Deputy Branch Chief of the Permatang Pauh of PKR with 642 votes.

== Honours ==
- Malaysia
  - Recipient of the 17th Yang di-Pertuan Agong Installation Medal (2024)
