= Malaysian Indian Congress =

Malaysian political party

- Malay name: Kongres India Se-Malaysia كوڠݢريس اينديا سمليسيا
- Chinese name: 马来西亚印度国民大会; Mǎláixīyà Yìndù Guómín Dàhuì
- Tamil name: மலேசிய இந்திய காங்கிரஸ் Malēciya Intiya Kāṅkiras
- Abbreviation: MIC / ம.இ.கா
- President: Vigneswaran Sanasee
- Secretary-General: Ananthan Somasundaram
- Spokesperson: Ramalingam Krishnamoorthy
- Deputy President: Saravanan Murugan
- Vice-President: Asojan Muniyandy; Murugiah Thopasamy; Nelson Renganathan; Vell Paari Samy Vellu; Ramasamy Muthusamy
- Youth Leader: Arvind Krishnan
- Woman Leader: Saraswathy Nallathamby
- Putera Leader Puteri Leader: Shatesh Kumar; Teeba Solaimalai
- Founder: John Thivy
- Founded: 4 August 1946
- Preceded by: Malayan Indian Congress
- Headquarters: 6th floor, Menara Manicavasagam, No. 1, Jalan Rahmat, 50350 Kuala Lumpur, Malaysia
- Newspaper: MIC Times; Tamil Malar; Makkal Osai
- Youth wing: MIC Youth Movement
- Women's wing: MIC Women Movement
- Putera Wing: MIC Putera Movement
- Puteri Wing: MIC Puteri Movement
- Ideology: Malaysian Indian interests Social conservatism Dravidian movement
- Political position: Centre-right
- National affiliation: Barisan Nasional (since 1974) (Note: The party was member of the All-Malaya Council of Joint Action (1948–1953) and Alliance (1954–1973). Through BN it was aligned with United Alliance of Sabah (2018–2020) and Muafakat Nasional (2019–2020) and is aligned with Perikatan Nasional (2020–2022), Gabungan Parti Sarawak (since 2018) and Gabungan Rakyat Sabah (since 2020)); National Unity Government (since 2022)
- Colours: Green and white
- Anthem: Saathanai Namathu Kaiyile
- Dewan Negara: 0 / 70
- Dewan Rakyat: 1 / 222
- Dewan Undangan Negeri: 6 / 612

Election symbol
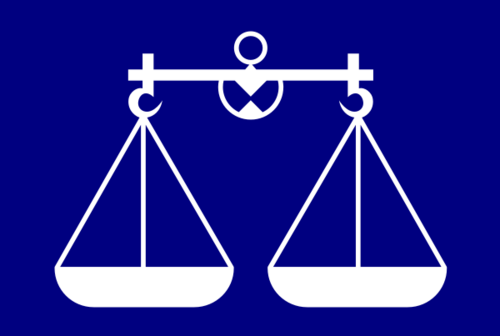

Party flag

Website
- www.mic.org.my

The Malaysian Indian Congress (abbrev: MIC; Malay: Kongres India Se-Malaysia), formerly known as Malayan Indian Congress, is a Malaysian political party. Founded in 1946 to advocate for Indian independence from British colonial rule, it turned its focus to the struggle for independence of Malaya (now Malaysia). It positioned itself to represent the Indian community in Malaya and was a founding member of the Alliance along with the United Malays National Organisation (UMNO) and Malaysian Chinese Association (MCA), which later became Barisan Nasional. Previously seen as the political representative of Malaysian Indians, it has become increasingly marginalised electorally since 2008.

== History ==
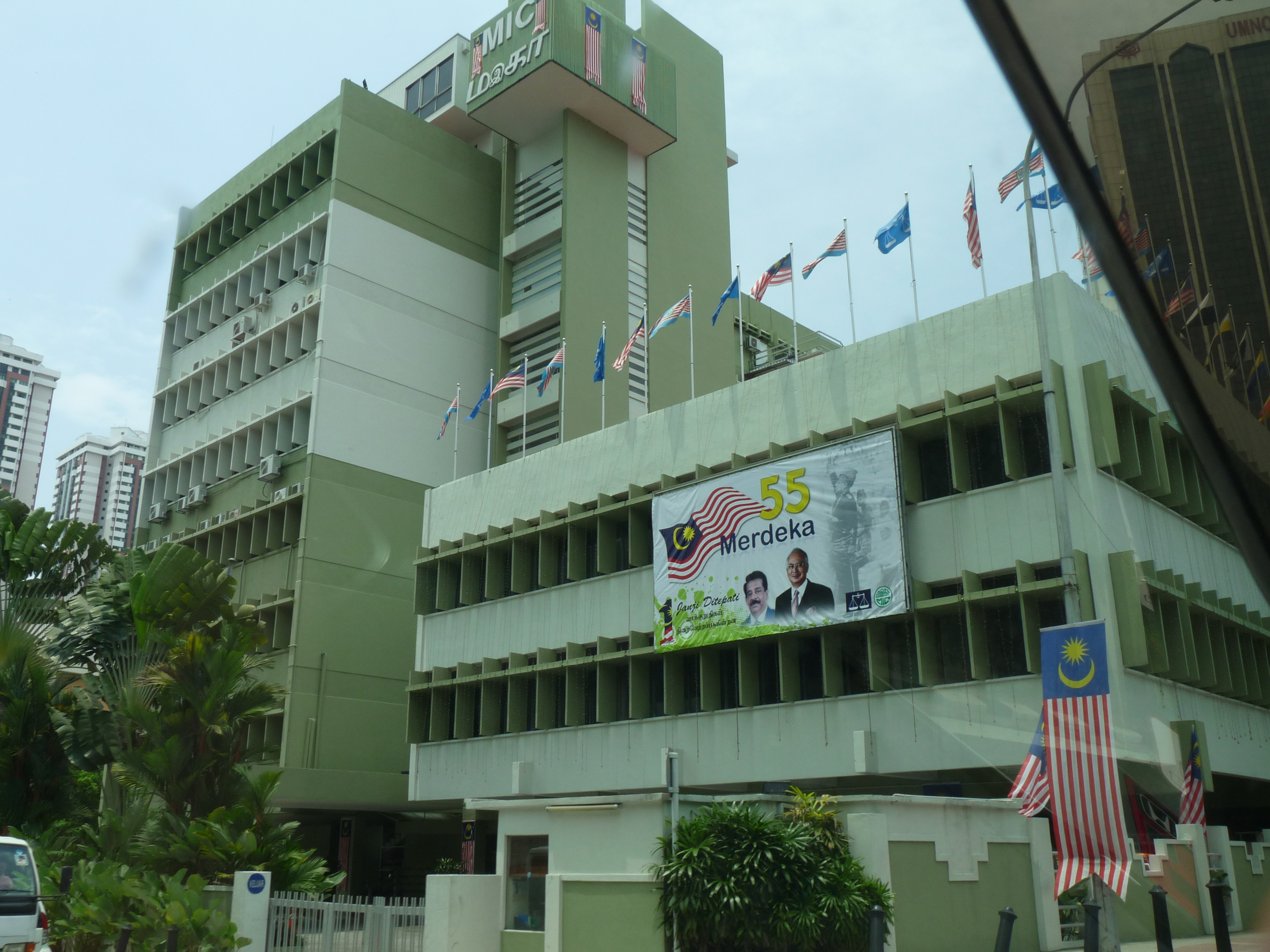
MIC Headquarters

=== Founding and Indian nationalist roots ===
John Thivy, the founder of the MIC, met Mahatma Gandhi in London while studying law. He was inspired by Gandhi's ideology and Nehru's vision and became determined to fight for Indian independence. He became actively involved in the Indian nationalist movement and returned to Malaya. He founded the Malaya Indian Congress in August 1946, and was party president until 1947. The word 'Congress' in the party's name is taken from the Indian National Congress, the party Mahatma Gandhi led to fight for Indian independence.

=== Becoming a Malayan party ===
After India gained independence in 1947, the MIC changed its focus and started to fight for the independence of Malaya. Baba Budh Singh Ji became president of MIC in 1947. After World War II, the British had established the Malayan Union, unifying the Malay Peninsula under a single government to simplify administration. Although a majority of the Indian community supported the Malayan Union, the MIC did not. The Malayan Union was dissolved in 1948 after widespread Malay protests and replaced with the Federation of Malaya. The MIC later joined the All-Malaya Council of Joint Action under Tun Tan Cheng Lock in opposition to the Federation of Malaya Agreement.

K. Ramanathan became president in 1950. By this time, the MIC was the leading party representing Indians in Malaya. Ramanathan advocated for the relaxation of the language proficiency test as a prerequisite for citizenship for Indians, and urged Indians to obtain federal citizenship.

The MIC's fourth President, Kundan Lal Devaser, served from 1951 to 1955. It was during his period that MIC started to focus on the fight for Malayan independence.

Under Devaser, the MIC contested the 1952 Kuala Lumpur Municipal Elections in alliance with the Independence of Malaya Party, Dato' Onn bin Jaafar and other non-communal organisations. The election ended with a failure for MIC as their coalition was defeated by the Alliance Party. The defeat showed MIC that it stood a better chance of gaining influence by joining the Alliance. In 1954 the MIC joined the United Malays National Organisation and the Malayan Chinese Association in the Alliance, securing a place for Indians in the administration. The party's broader membership was less enthusiastic than the MIC leadership about joining the Alliance but were willing to support the move if the party could secure concessions from the Alliance on inter-communal issues, particularly on education.

Devaser was primarily popular among the urban-based Indian elite, and lacked wider grassroots support. For the first eight years, MIC leaders were either of North Indian or Malayalee origin, a minority among Malayan Indians. The majority of Indians in Malaya at that time were Tamils, most of whom were labourers in plantations. Indian plantation workers experienced enforced segregation because of plantation compound housing. The plantation labour system also worked against the integration of Indian workers into society and perpetuated racial and occupational differentiation. Plantation workers were unable to acquire the skills required to move to better-paying jobs.

Migrant plantation workers were both marginalised and polarised in Malaya. Their wages were tied to rubber prices, falling when the rubber price fell, and were about 50c per day. Devaser came under heavy criticism from the Tamil media for not addressing the pressing issues facing the community. Some in the party felt that there was a need for a leader with a stronger relationship with the party's grassroots. In March 1955, the local daily Tamil Murasu urged Tamils to boycott the MIC. This was followed by a call for change in MIC's leadership, led by Tamil MIC leaders, and Devaser stepped down. The MIC then faced the challenge of reconciling the political aspirations of the middle class with the needs of the working class, who at the time comprised 84% of the plantation workforce.

=== Tamil dominance ===
In May 1955, Tun V. T. Sambanthan was elected as the fifth President of the Malayan Indian Congress. Sambanthan started a recruitment campaign among plantation workers, relying on the patronage of Hinduism in its popular South Indian form, increased use of the Tamil language, and encouraging Tamil cultural activities. He personally toured plantations and encouraged Tamils to join the MIC. This led to a fragmentation of the Indian community, with traditionalists and the lower middle class becoming prominent in the party while upper-class professionals and the intelligentsia moved away from it. Two paths to leadership emerged in the Indian community, via politics or via trade union activism, with very little interaction between them.

Under Sambanthan's leadership, the MIC effectively became a Tamil party. Sambanthan served as president of the MIC until 1971 and was largely responsible for the transformation of the party to a conservative and traditionalist party emphasising Indian culture, religion and language. It was the weakest of the three main political parties, with the smallest electorate (7.4% in 1959) and had little support from the Indian community at large.

The Indian community was geographically dispersed and divided and comprised less than 25% of the population in any constituency. The MIC's overriding concern was therefore to remain a partner in the Alliance and obtain whatever concessions it could from the dominant UMNO. This led the MIC to compromise on priorities such as the political and economic rights of workers.

Sambanthan sold approximately half of his father's 2.4 km^{2} rubber estate and donated part of the money to the MIC. He was not uniformly popular but was able to gradually unite a party that had significant internal divides. During his presidency, in 1957, Malaysian independence was achieved. Sambanathan was involved in the negotiations with the British government's Reid Commission to draw up the new Malayan constitution. In 1963 Singapore, Sabah and Sarawak merged with the Federation of Malaya to form the Federation of Malaysia, and the MIC renamed itself the Malaysian Indian Congress.

Sambanathan was forced to retire in favour of V. Manickavasagam in 1973 after a rebellion by five MIC leaders including Samy Vellu.

Manickavasagam served as president of MIC from 1973 to 1978. During this period, Malaysia's New Economic Policy was being developed, and the MIC convened two economic conferences in an unsuccessful effort to advocate for the interests of Indians.

It was during this period that the MIC, as member of the Alliance, became part of the Barisan Nasional. The party sponsored the Nesa Multipurpose Cooperative and the MIC Unit Trust as part of its programme for economic ventures. It also set up the MIC Education Fund for members' children and the Malaysian Indian Scholarship Fund for higher education as well as acquiring an Institute for training Indians in technical and trade skills.

Manickavasagam appointed several new representatives to leadership positions, including Subramaniam Sathasivam, Datuk K. Pathmanaban, a Harvard MBA holder, and several others. They were young, well-educated and ambitious but lacked grassroots experience. Subramaniam was hand-picked by Manickavasagam to become deputy president and succeed him, but the party elected Samy Vellu as Deputy President instead, by a narrow margin of 26 votes.

Samy Vellu became MIC president in 1979 and served until 2010. Under his leadership, in 1984, the MIC founded the Maju Institute of Education Development (MIED) to offer educational opportunities and financial support to Indian students in Malaysia. Since its establishment, more than 10,000 students have obtained loans and scholarships totaling about RM60 million MIED fund as of 2013. In 2001, the MIC and MIED launched an AIMST University with the stated goal of helping Indians acquire professional training. Vellu was the founding chancellor of the university. By 2018, the university had achieved a score of 4 on the Malaysian Higher Education Institution's 5-point rating scale. However, AIMST's commitment to training Indian students has been questioned.

=== Marginalisation ===
The party suffered heavy losses in the 2008 election, as Indian voters by and large voted against the party and the Barisan Nasional coalition, as part of the broader swing towards the opposition that year. Vellu lost his seat, along with a number of high-profile MIC leaders.

Since 2008, the party has seen its influence and relevance among the Indian community diminished, as its electorate shifted their support to the Democratic Action Party (DAP) and People's Justice Party (PKR).

Vellu was succeeded by Palanivel Govindasamy who served from 2010 to 2014. Subramaniam was then elected, initially in an acting role, serving from 2014 to 2018. As of 2019, the party is led by Vigneswaran Sanasee.

== Organisational structure ==
=== Central Working Committee ===
- President:
  - Vigneswaran Sanasee
- Deputy President:
  - Saravanan Murugan
- Vice Presidents:
  - Asojan Muniyandy
  - Murugiah Thopasamy
  - Nelson Renganathan
  - Vell Paari Samy Vellu
  - Ramasamy Muthusamy
- Secretary-General:
  - Ananthan Somasundaram
- Treasurer-General:
  - Sivakumar Nadraja
- Information Chief:
  - Ramalingam Krishnamoorthy
- Organising Secretary:
  - Muneandy Nalepan
- Executive Secretary:
  - Kumararajah Tambyraja
- Chairman of the Disciplinary Committee:
  - S.Murugavelu
- Building Committee Chairman:
  - N. Rawisandran
- National Strategy Officer:
  - R. Thinalan
- National Media Bureau:
  - L. Sivasubramaniam
- Youth Leader:
  - Arvind Krishnan
- Deputy Youth Leader:
  - Kesavan Kandasamy
- Women Leader:
  - N. Saraswathy
- Deputy Women Leader:
  - Dr P.Tanaletchumy
- Putera Leader:
  - Dr Shatesh Kumar Sangar
- Deputy Putera Leader:
  - Dr Amarveen Malairaja Karuppanan
- Puteri Leader:
  - S. Teeba
- Deputy Puteri Leader:
  - Premala Arasu

Central Working Committee members:

1. M. Veeran
2. K. Subramaniam
3. D. Tharma Kumaran
4. K. Balasundaram
5. P. Kamalanathan
6. K. Parthiban
7. D. Vincent
8. S. Tamilvanan
9. S. Suppayah
10. M. Mathuraiveran
11. S. Marathamuthu
12. N. Maneanay
13. T. Novalan
14. G. Sivah
15. M. Karuppanan
16. K. Sathasivam
17. R. Supramaniam
18. R. Rajandran
19. G. Raman
20. M. Rajandran
21. S. Ananthan
22. V. Arumugam
23. Datuk Dhinagaran
24. S. Rajah
25. V. Elango
26. R. Vidyananthan
27. L. Manickam
28. A. Mangleswaran
29. S. Renugopal
30. V. P. Shanmugam
31. Peer Mohamad Bin Kadir
32. C. Sivaraajh
33. K. Ramalingam
34. S. Murugavelu
35. A. Sakthivel
36. N. Sivakumar
37. Siva Subramaniam
38. R. Balasubramaniam
39. A. Krishnaveny
40. R. Inbavally
41. K. Arvind
42. K. Kesavan
43. N. Saraswati
44. R. Nelson

- State chairmen:
  - Perlis: S. Ilanckoh
  - Kedah: SK.Suresh
  - Kelantan: S. Renugopal
  - Terengganu: A. Mangeleswaran
  - Penang: Datuk Dhinagaran
  - Perak: M.Ramasamy
  - Pahang: V. Arumugam
  - Selangor: M. Shanker Raj
  - Federal Territories: S. Rajah
  - Negeri Sembilan: P. Supramaniam
  - Malacca: YB P. Shanmugam
  - Johor: YB Raven Kumar
  - Sabah: Peer Mohamad Kadir

== Leadership ==
=== Presidents of the Malayan Indian Congress (1946–1963) ===
Order	Name	Term of office		Notes
1	John Thivy	4 August 1946	1947	
2	Baba Budh Singh Ji	1947	1950	
3	K. Ramanathan Chettiar	1950	1952	
4	Kundan Lal Devaser	1952	May 1955	
5	V. T. Sambanthan	May 1955	16 September 1963	

=== Presidents of the Malaysian Indian Congress (1963–present) ===
Order	Name	Term of office		Time in office	Notes
5	V. T. Sambanthan	16 September 1963	30 June 1973	9 years, 287 days	
6	V. Manickavasagam	30 June 1973	12 October 1978	5 years, 104 days	
7	Samy Vellu	12 October 1979	6 December 2010	31 years, 55 days	
8	Palanivel Govindasamy	6 December 2010	23 June 2013	2 years, 199 days	
–	Subramaniam Sathasivam	23 June 2013	25 June 2015	2 years, 2 days	Acting President
9	Subramaniam Sathasivam	25 June 2015	15 July 2018	3 years, 20 days	
10	Vigneswaran Sanasee	15 July 2018	Incumbent	8 years, 127 days	

== Elected representatives ==
=== Dewan Negara (Senate) ===
==== Senators ====
- His Majesty's appointee:

=== Dewan Rakyat (House of Representatives) ===
==== Members of Parliament of the 15th Malaysian Parliament ====
As of 2019, MIC has only 1 MP in the House of Representatives.

State	No.	Parliament Constituency	Member	Party
Perak	P072	Tapah	Saravanan Murugan	MIC
Total	Perak (1)			

=== Dewan Undangan Negeri (State Legislative Assembly) ===
==== Malaysian State Assembly Representatives ====
Johor State Legislative Assembly
4 / 56
Malacca State Legislative Assembly
1 / 28
Pahang State Legislative Assembly
1 / 47
Negeri Sembilan State Legislative Assembly
0 / 36
Perlis State Legislative Assembly
0 / 15
Kedah State Legislative Assembly
0 / 36
Kelantan State Legislative Assembly
0 / 45
Terengganu State Legislative Assembly
0 / 33
Penang State Legislative Assembly
0 / 40
Perak State Legislative Assembly
0 / 59
Selangor State Legislative Assembly
0 / 56
Sabah State Legislative Assembly
0 / 73
Sarawak State Legislative Assembly
0 / 82

State	No.	Federal Constituency	No.	State Constituency	Member	Party
Pahang	P089	Bentong	N35	Sabai	Arumugam Veerappa Pillai	MIC
Malacca	P135	Alor Gajah	N07	Gadek	Nadarajah Sellappa	MIC
Johor	P141	Sekijang	N04	Kemelah	Raven Kumar Krishnasamy	MIC
Johor	P153	Sembrong	N31	Kahang	Rugendran Vellayan	MIC
Johor	P161	Pulai	N46	Perling	Pannir Selvam Paliksina	MIC
Johor	P163	Kulai	N51	Bukit Batu	Kumaran Ramakrishnan	MIC
Total	Pahang (1), Malacca (1), Johor (4)					

== Government offices ==
=== State governments ===
MIC serves a junior partner role in Barisan Nasional and Alliance

- Johor (1957–2018, 2020–present)
- Pahang (1978–2013, 2022–present)
- Malacca (1964–1969, 1986–2018, 2021–present)
- Negeri Sembilan (1957–2018)
- Selangor (1957–2008)
- Perak (1957–1969, 1974–2008)
- Kedah (1959–1969, 1978–2008)
- Penang (1957–1969, 1974–1986, 1991–2008)

Note: bold as Menteri Besar/Chief Minister, italic as junior partner

== Election results ==
=== General election results ===
Election	Total seats won	Seats contested	Total votes	Share of votes	Outcome of election	Election leader
1955	2 / 52	2	26,868	2.68%	▲2 seats; Governing coalition (Alliance Party)	V. T. Sambanthan
1959	3 / 104	3	15,711	1.02%	▲1 seat; Governing coalition (Alliance Party)	V. T. Sambanthan
1964	3 / 104	3	19,269	1.60%	; Governing coalition (Alliance Party)	V. T. Sambanthan
1969	2 / 144	3			▼1 seat; Governing coalition (Alliance Party)	V. T. Sambanthan
1974	4 / 144	5			▲2 seats; Governing coalition (Barisan Nasional)	V. Manickavasagam
1978	3 / 154	5			▼1 seat; Governing coalition (Barisan Nasional)	V. Manickavasagam
1982	4 / 154	5			▲1 seat; Governing coalition (Barisan Nasional)	Samy Vellu
1986	6 / 177	7	104,701	2.21%	▲2 seats; Governing coalition (Barisan Nasional)	Samy Vellu
1990	6 / 180	7			; Governing coalition (Barisan Nasional)	Samy Vellu
1995	7 / 192				▲1 seat; Governing coalition (Barisan Nasional)	Samy Vellu
1999	7 / 193				; Governing coalition (Barisan Nasional)	Samy Vellu
2004	9 / 219		221,546	3.2%	▲2 seats; Governing coalition (Barisan Nasional)	Samy Vellu
2008	3 / 222	9	179,422	2.21%	▼6 seats; Governing coalition (Barisan Nasional)	Samy Vellu
2013	4 / 222	9	286,629	2.59%	▲1 seat; Governing coalition (Barisan Nasional)	Palanivel Govindasamy
2018	2 / 222	9	167,061	1.39%	▼2 seats; Opposition coalition, later Governing coalition (Barisan Nasional)	S. Subramaniam
2022	1 / 222	10	172,176	1.11%	▼1 seat; Governing coalition (Barisan Nasional)	Vigneswaran Sanasee

=== State election results ===
State assembly	Election	Votes	%	Seats	Won/contested	+/–	Position (Note: As part of electoral coalition.)	Status
Perlis	2022	Did not contest						No seats
Kedah	2023	Did not contest						No seats
Kelantan	2023	Did not contest						No seats
Terengganu	2023	Did not contest						No seats
Penang	2023	Did not contest						No seats
Perak	2022	10,324	0.7	0 / 59	0 / 3	Steady	▼3rd (Barisan Nasional)	No seats
Pahang	2022	4,444	0.5	1 / 42	1 / 1	▲1	▼2nd (Barisan Nasional)	BN–PH
Selangor	2023	Did not contest						No seats
Negeri Sembilan	2026	13,837	2.2	0 / 36	0 / 2	Steady	▲1st (Barisan Nasional)	No seats
Malacca	2026	6,472	1.3	1 / 28	1 / 1	Steady	1st (Barisan Nasional)	BN–PN
Johor	2026	77,511	4.1	4 / 56	4 / 4	▲1	1st (Barisan Nasional)	BN
Sabah	2025	Did not participate						No seats

Note

State election	State Legislative Assembly												
State election	Perlis State Legislative Assembly	Kedah State Legislative Assembly	Kelantan State Legislative Assembly	Terengganu State Legislative Assembly	Penang State Legislative Assembly	Perak State Legislative Assembly	Pahang State Legislative Assembly	Selangor State Legislative Assembly	Negeri Sembilan State Legislative Assembly	Malacca State Legislative Assembly	Johor State Legislative Assembly	Sabah State Legislative Assembly	Total won / Total contested
2/3 majority	2 / 3	2 / 3	2 / 3	2 / 3	2 / 3	2 / 3	2 / 3	2 / 3	2 / 3	2 / 3	2 / 3	2 / 3	
2013		0 / 36			0 / 40	0 / 59	0 / 42	0 / 56	1 / 36	1 / 28	3 / 56		5 / 18
2018		0 / 36			0 / 40	0 / 59	0 / 42	0 / 56	1 / 36	0 / 28	2 / 56		3 / 18
2021										1 / 28			1 / 1
2022											3 / 56		3 / 4
2022	0 / 15					0 / 59	1 / 42						1 / 4
2026									0 / 36	1 / 28	4 / 56		5 / 7

== See also ==
- List of political parties in Malaysia
- Politics of Malaysia
