= Vell Paari Samy Vellu =

Malaysian politician

Yang Berhormat Senator Dato' Sri Vell Paari Samy Vellu SSAP

Senator

Appointed by the Yang di-Pertuan Agong
- Incumbent
- Assumed office 2 September 2023
- Monarchs: Abdullah (2023); Ibrahim Iskandar (since 2024)
- Prime Minister: Anwar Ibrahim (since 2022)
- In office 2 September 2020 – 1 September 2023
- Monarchs: Abdullah (2020–2023)
- Prime Minister: Muhyiddin Yassin (2020–2021); Ismail Sabri Yaakob (2021–2022); Anwar Ibrahim (since 2022)

Personal details
- Born: Vell Paari a/l Samy Vellu; 16 November 1962 (age 63) Selangor
- Party: Malaysian Indian Congress (MIC)
- Spouse: Shaila Nair
- Parent: Samy Vellu (father)
- Occupation: Politician

Vell Paari s/o Samy Vellu (born 16 November 1962) is a Malaysian politician who has served as a Senator since 2 September 2020. He is a member of Malaysian Indian Congress (MIC), a component party of Barisan Nasional (BN). He is the son of the party's president, Samy Vellu.

== Issue ==
=== Death of K. Sujatha ===
On 25 June 2007, K Sujatha, a local Tamil actor and also his former private secretary from 1999 to 2007 was found drinking SP Paraquat poison at Sang Suria Condominium, Jalan Ipoh, Kuala Lumpur before going out to watch a movie with him at a cinema. Vell Paari sent Sujatha to Tengku Ampuan Rahimah Hospital, Klang after getting advice from Dr. Sakthi Vello. 3 days later, on 25 July 2007, died in hospital.

In the inquest into K Sujatha's death, a torn wedding photo of Vell Paari was found on the actor's bed in an apartment and Vell Paari did not know how the photo got there.

Vell Paari supports the studies of Sujatha's two younger brothers, K. Ugenthiran, 28, and K. Surenthiran, 26, in Australia.

On 9 July 2009, MP of Kapar Manikavasagam Sundram revealed 3 videotapes of Sujatha's funeral.

=== Anti Samy Vellu Movement ===
Vell Paari accused former deputy president Datuk Subramaniam Sathasivam of being the 'mastermind' behind the establishment of the 'Anti Samy Vellu Movement announced by V. Mugilan. Mugilan, members of the MIC Central Working Committee (CWC) K.P Samy and G. Kumar Aamaan were fired for criticizing the MIC president. Mugilan's name suddenly became hot and exploded to be a candidate to compete in the April 2010 Hulu Selangor by-election. It is understood that BN Chairman Datuk Seri Najib Tun Razak and his deputy, Tan Sri Muhyiddin Yassin has agreed with Mugilan's name after voters in Hulu Selangor rejected MIC deputy president Datuk Palanivel Govindasamy to contest again.

=== Accusation of UMNO mastermind breaking MIC ===
On 24 May 2010 on the Free Malaysia Today website, Vell Paari accused UMNO of meddling in the party's crisis and was involved in trying to get rid of his father. UMNO used the "political assassination" approach to split MIC. Inequality caused the Chinese and Indians not to vote BN in the 2008 election and not because of leadership issues in the MCA and MIC parties as has been hotly talked about lately.

On 25 May 2010, UMNO Deputy President, Tan Sri Muhyiddin Yassin described the accusation as rude and asked Samy Vellu to advise his son not to issue statements that could affect the sensitivity of other BN component parties.

The party leader has been described as being 'dictator-style', who cannot be reprimanded at all and anyone who does so will be fired.

=== Dropped by Palanivel ===
Following the 2013 general elections, MIC President G Palanivel announced that Vell Paari was being dropped from the party’s central working committee.

=== Feud with Mathathir ===
In April 2018, he lashed out against former prime minister Mahathir Mohamad, calling him a blackhearted racist for his persistence in using the derogatory term for Indians - keling. Vell Paari said that throught Mahathir's rule, he had persisted in treating Indians as third-class citizens in Malaysia.

=== Tamil Nesan closure ===
As managing director of Tamil language newspaper Tamil Nesan, Vell Paari made the difficult decision in February 2019 to shut down the paper after 94 years.

=== Father’s decline and death ===
On December 2, 2019 he filed an originating summons at the High Court against his father Samy Vellu. It was filed under Section 52 of the Mental Health Act 2001 in order to determine whether his father was still mentally capable of handling his own business and legal affairs.

On September 15, 2022, his father died aged 86.

=== Senatorial appointment ===
He was first sworn in as a Senator on September 2, 2020. Three years later he was appointed to a second term which will expire on September 1, 2026.

== Honours ==
- Malaysia
  - Recipient of the 17th Yang di-Pertuan Agong Installation Medal
- Pahang
  - Grand Knight of the Order of Sultan Ahmad Shah of Pahang (SSAP) – Dato' Sri (2013)
