= Muhyiddin Yassin =

8th Prime Minister of Malaysia (2020–2021)

Yang Berhormat Tan Sri Dato' Haji Muhyiddin Yassin PSM SPMJ SHMS SPSA SPMP SUNS SPDK DUNM DP PNBS SMJ PIS BSI MP
- محيي الدين ياسين
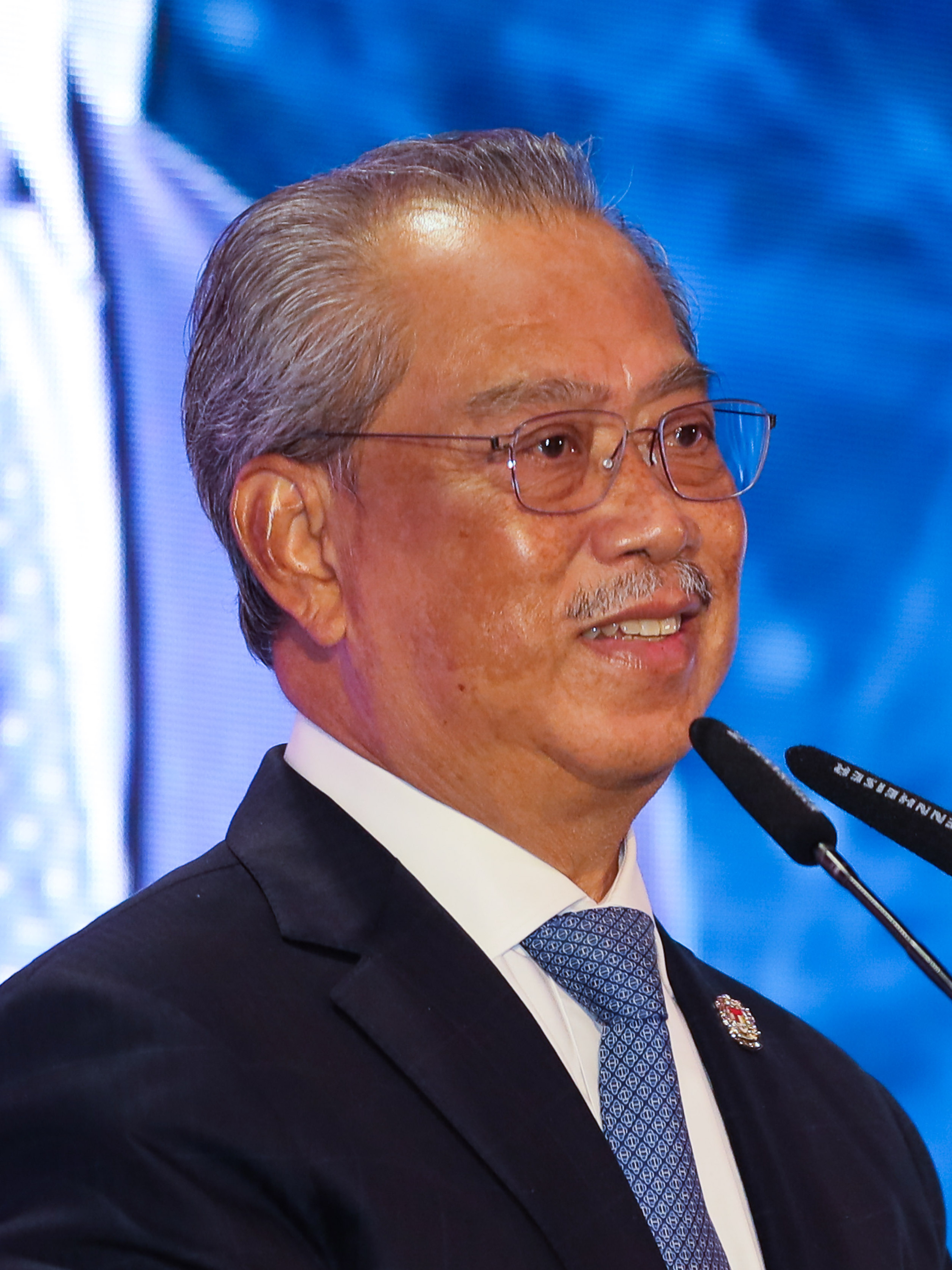
- Muhyiddin in 2021

8th Prime Minister of Malaysia
- In office 1 March 2020 – 16 August 2021; Caretaker: 16–21 August 2021
- Monarch: Abdullah
- Deputy: Ismail Sabri Yaakob
- Preceded by: Mahathir Mohamad
- Succeeded by: Ismail Sabri Yaakob

Menteri Besar of Johor
- In office 12 August 1986 – 13 May 1995
- Monarch: Iskandar
- Preceded by: Abdul Ajib Ahmad
- Succeeded by: Abdul Ghani Othman

President of the Malaysian United Indigenous Party
- Incumbent
- Assumed office 7 September 2016
- Deputy: Mukhriz Mahathir (2016–2020); Ahmad Faizal Azumu (2020–2024); Hamzah Zainuddin (2024–2026); Radzi Jidin (acting); Ahmad Faizal Azumu (acting) (2026–present)
- Preceded by: Position established
Ministerial portfolios
1981–1982	Parliamentary Secretary of Foreign Affairs
1982–1983	Deputy Minister of Federal Territories
1983–1986	Deputy Minister of Trade and Industry
1995–1999	Minister of Youth and Sports
1999–2004	Minister of Domestic Trade and Consumerism
2004–2008	Minister of Agriculture and Agro-Based Industry
2008–2009	Minister of International Trade and Industry
2009–2015	Minister of Education
2009–2015	Deputy Prime Minister
2018–2020	Minister of Home Affairs
2021–2022	Chairman of the National Recovery Council
Parliamentary offices
Member of the Malaysian Parliament for Pagoh
Incumbent
Assumed office 26 April 1995
Preceded by	Ahmad Omar
In office 23 July 1978 – 3 August 1986
Preceded by	Syed Nasir Ismail
Succeeded by	Ahmad Omar
Member of the Johor State Legislative Assembly for Bukit Serampang
In office 4 August 1986 – 25 April 1995
Preceded by	Zakaria Salleh
Succeeded by	Ahmad Omar
Member of the Johor State Legislative Assembly for Gambir
In office 10 May 2018 – 11 March 2022
Preceded by	Asojan Muniyandy
Succeeded by	Sahrihan Jani
Party offices
2009–2016	Deputy President of UMNO
2020	Acting Chairman of BERSATU
2020–2025	Chairman of Perikatan Nasional
2026–	Deputy Chairman of Perikatan Nasional

Personal details
- Born: Mahiaddin bin Md. Yasin; 15 May 1947 (age 79) Muar, Johor, Malayan Union
- Citizenship: Malaysia
- Party: UMNO (1971–2016); BERSATU (2016–present)
- Other political affiliations: Alliance (1971–1973); BN (1973– 2016); PH (2016–2020); PN (2020–present)
- Spouse: Noorainee Abdul Rahman (m. 1972)
- Children: 4
- Education: University of Malaya (BA)
- Occupation: Politician, civil servant
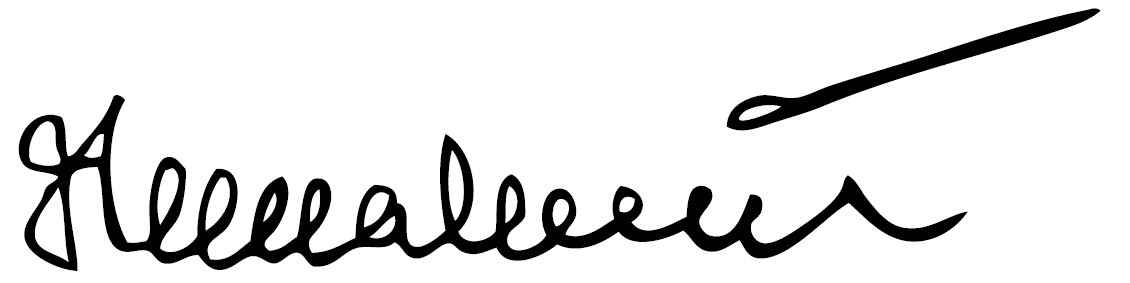
- Signature

Muhyiddin Yassin

Faction represented in Dewan Rakyat
- 1978–1986: Barisan Nasional
- 1995–2016: Barisan Nasional
- 2016–2017: Independent
- 2017–2018: Malaysian United Indigenous Party
- 2018–2020: Pakatan Harapan
- 2020: Malaysian United Indigenous Party
- 2020–: Perikatan Nasional

Faction represented in Johor State Legislative Assembly
- 1986–1995: Barisan Nasional
- 2018–2020: Pakatan Harapan
- 2020: Malaysian United Indigenous Party
- 2020–2022: Perikatan Nasional

Mahiaddin bin Md. Yasin (Note: The birth name / legal name based on his Malaysian identity card.) (born 15 May 1947), commonly known as Muhyiddin Yassin, (Note: Jawi: محيي الدين بن محمد ياسين; IPA: [muhjɪddɪn jɑ̀ssɪn]) is a Malaysian politician and civil servant who served as the eighth prime minister of Malaysia from 2020 until his resignation in 2021 after losing parliamentary support amid the 2020–2022 political crisis. A president of BERSATU, he represented Pagoh in Dewan Rakyat since 1995 and previously served as the Menteri Besar of Johor from 1986 to 1995.

Born in Johor, Muhyiddin started his career in the state public service after graduating from University of Malaya (UM). He assumed management positions at various state-owned enterprise. In 1978, he was elected as the Member of Parliament for Pagoh. During this term, he was appointed parliamentary secretary to the minister of foreign affairs, deputy minister of federal territories and later deputy minister of trade and industry. As the Johor UMNO chief, he was the state's Menteri Besar from 1986 to 1995. He returned to federal politics in 1995. He was appointed to the Cabinet as Minister of Youth and Sports. He was appointed Minister of Domestic Trade and Consumer Affairs after the 1999 general election and became a vice president of UMNO in 2000. Under the premiership of Abdullah Ahmad Badawi, Muhyiddin served as Minister of Agriculture and Agro-based Industry from 2004 to 2008, and then as Minister of International Trade and Industry from 2008 to 2009.

In 2008, he contested and won the UMNO deputy presidency and was appointed Deputy Prime Minister and Minister of Education by Prime Minister Najib Razak in 2009. As Minister of Education, Muhyiddin ended the use of English as the medium of instruction for science and mathematics in public schools. He also attracted controversy after describing himself as "Malay first" when challenged by the Opposition to pronounce himself as "Malaysian first". Muhyiddin was a vocal critic of his government and party over the 1MDB scandal; as a result, he was dropped from his position during Najib's mid-term cabinet reshuffle in July 2015, marking the first incumbent UMNO deputy president to be left out of the president's cabinet. In June 2016, he was expelled from UMNO.

He participated in founding the political party Malaysian United Indigenous Party (BERSATU) under Mahathir in 2016. He returned to the cabinet after his coalition of parties Pakatan Harapan won the 2018 Malaysian general election. In February 2020, BERSATU withdrew from Pakatan Harapan, culminating in a political crisis as the coalition lost its majority in the Dewan Rakyat. Following Prime Minister Mahathir Mohamad's subsequent resignation, Muhyiddin successfully formed a new coalition Perikatan Nasional by receiving support from enough MPs to form a majority government and was appointed prime minister on 1 March.

Much of his premiership was overseeing Malaysia's response to the COVID-19 pandemic, which became a major crisis shortly after he took office. This included enacting several iterations of the Movement Control Order (MCO), a vaccination programme and declaring a 2021 state of emergency, where parliament and elections were suspended. Although his government's initial response was praised by the WHO and had high local approval ratings, the worsening of the COVID-19 crisis in 2021 attracted criticism and destabilised the coalition. On 16 August 2021, he resigned after attempts to regain support from MPs were unsuccessful. He remained caretaker Prime Minister until his replacement Ismail Sabri Yaakob was selected on 21 August 2021.

Muhyiddin unsuccessfully ran as the prime ministerial candidate for Perikatan Nasional in the 2022 general election. In March 2023, Muhyiddin was arrested by the Malaysian Anti-Corruption Commission as part of a corruption investigation on several counts of money laundering and abuse of power, making him the second former prime minister after Najib Razak to be prosecuted.

== Early life and education ==
Muhyiddin was born as Mahiaddin bin Md. Yasin in Muar, Johor, Malaysia. His father, Haji Muhammad Yassin bin Muhammad, was a Malay of Bugis descent. Muhammad Yassin was an Islamic theologian and cleric based in Bandar Maharani, Muar, Johor, while his mother, Hajjah Khadijah binti Kassim, was a Malay of Javanese descent.

Muhyiddin received his primary education at Sekolah Kebangsaan Maharani, Muar, Johor, and Sekolah Kebangsaan Ismail, Muar, Johor. He received his secondary education at the Muar High School, Johor. Subsequently, he attended the University of Malaya, Kuala Lumpur. He received Bachelor of Arts (BA) in Economics and Malay studies in 1971.

== Early career ==
After completing his studies, Muhyiddin joined the Johor state public service as the assistant secretary of training and scholarship. In 1974, he was appointed the assistant district officer (ADO) of Muar. He left the civil service to join the corporate sector in the Johor State Economic Development Corporation (PKENJ), managing its subsidiary companies like Sergam Berhad as managing director (1974–1977), Equity Mal (Johore) Sdn Bhd as Director (1974–1978), Sri Saujana Berhad as managing director (1974–1978) and SGS Ates (M) Sdn Bhd as Human Resources Manager (1974).

While in the public service he became senior political aide to Johor Chief Minister Othman Saat.

== Early political career (1971–1995) ==
=== Early years ===
Muhyiddin's involvement in politics began when he joined UMNO as an ordinary member at the Muar Dalam division in 1971. He was elected as UMNO youth chief of the Pagoh division and the secretary in 1976. Later he became Youth Chief of Johor state UMNO Youth until 1987.

Muhyiddin occupied the seats of Exco in the national Malaysia UMNO Youth. In 1984, Muhyiddin was elected the UMNO division chief of Pagoh, replacing Othman Saat. Muhyiddin rose the ranks and file of Johor UMNO quickly. From being a state executive council member, he rose to become Johor UMNO's head and later became Menteri Besar of Johor.

Muhyiddin contested and was elected Member of Parliament for the Pagoh constituency in the 1978 general election and kept the seat until 1982. Muhyiddin was appointed Parliamentary Secretary in the Ministry for Foreign Affairs; subsequently, he was promoted to Deputy Minister in the Ministry of Federal Territories and later the Ministry of Trade and Industry.

In 1984, Muhyiddin contested a UMNO Supreme Council seat but lost. Muhyiddin was later appointed the UMNO Johor state liaison chairman and next appointed a Supreme Council member. In November 1990, he was a candidate for the UMNO vice-presidency but lost again. He attempted again in the November 1993 UMNO party election, successfully this time.

== Rise to prominence (1995–2009) ==
Muhyiddin returned to contest the Pagoh parliamentary seat in the 1995 General Election.

He served several different federal government cabinet posts as Minister of Youth and Sports (1995–1999), Minister of Domestic Trade and Consumer Affairs (1999–2004), Minister of Agriculture and Agro-based Industry (2004–2008) and Minister of International Trade and Industry (2008–2009).

Muhyiddin was seen as a supporter of Abdullah Ahmad Badawi, and was expected to become Badawi's deputy prime minister when Badawi replaced Mahathir. However, when Badawi became prime minister in November 2003, Najib Razak was appointed deputy.

He lost the 1996 election when defending the vice-president post. Eventually, in the election in 2000, he again won the post of vice-president of UMNO, remaining in that post until the October 2008 party election, when Muhyiddin successfully sought the higher post of deputy president, which was left vacant as the incumbent, Najib Razak (who was acting party president after the retirement of Abdullah Ahmad Badawi), became UMNO president.

=== 2009 UMNO General Assembly and party election ===
Muhyiddin attacked Abdullah Ahmad Badawi's original transition plan as "too long", and some people [who?] say that at one point, Muhyiddin was about to ask and force Abdullah to quit, though he never did so directly. During the 2008 general election, Muhyiddin managed to keep his seat and remained as an UMNO leader. Shocked by the election results, he called for reforms.

During the 2009 UMNO General Assembly and party election, Muhyiddin was a candidate for the deputy president post, which was vacated by the incoming prime minister Najib Tun Razak. He was challenged by Mohd Ali Rustam, Malacca chief minister, and Muhammad Muhammad Taib, Rural and Regional Development Minister. Muhyiddin, seen as a supporter of Mahathir Mohamad, was seen to be the front-runner for the race, garnering many nominations by the UMNO divisions. Nevertheless, the competition was tough, as Taib and Rustam gained more ground, especially from the Badawi camp. Political analysts tipped the race to be very tight. However, the UMNO supreme council decided to disqualify Ali Rustam's candidacy after his assistants were caught involved with corruption after an investigation. The election resulted in Muhyiddin's election to the post with 1,575 votes to Muhammad Taib's 916.

== Deputy premiership (2009–2015) ==
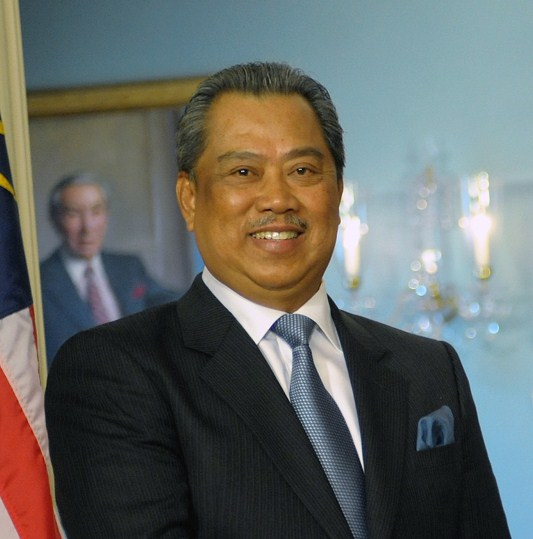
Muhyiddin at the U.S. Department of State in Washington, D.C., in 2010

Muhyiddin was appointed deputy prime minister on 9 April 2009, when Najib took over from Abdullah Ahmad Badawi and unveiled his first Cabinet.

Muhyidden was appointed Deputy Prime Minister and Minister of Education by Prime Minister Najib Razak in 2009.

Continuing as Minister for Education, he announced the decision to return to the teaching of mathematics and science in Malay in all government primary and secondary schools.

Muhyiddin waded into controversy in March 2010 by stating he was "Malay first" rather than "Malaysian first". He also said that there is nothing wrong with other races doing the same; for example, the Chinese could claim themselves to be "Chinese first, Malaysian second" and same for the Indians. On 13 July 2010, he said that anyone was free to form an association, including Chinese or Indian versions of the Malay rights group Perkasa. Prime Minister Najib came to Muhyiddin's defence, denying that his statement was inconsistent with the "1Malaysia" concept promoted by the government.

=== Sacked from the cabinet ===
During Najib's mid-term Cabinet reshuffle on 28 July 2015, he was dropped from his position as deputy prime minister. The dismissal came after Muhyiddin had made public and critical remarks about Najib's handling of the 1Malaysia Development Berhad scandal. Najib stated that Muhyiddin's dismissal, and the contemporaneous dismissals of other Ministers who had been critical of his leadership, was to create a more "unified team". Muhyiddin remained UMNO deputy president, but after keeping up criticism of UMNO, he was eventually sacked by the party's supreme council in June 2016. Muhyiddin remained unrepentant, maintaining that he had never betrayed the party and pledging to continue speaking out.

== Post deputy premiership (2015–2018) ==
=== Establishment of BERSATU party ===
In August 2016, Muhyiddin registered a new political party, called Parti Pribumi Bersatu Malaysia (PPBM or Bersatu for short) together with former prime minister Mahathir Mohamad. Muhyiddin became the party's president while Mahathir and his son Mukhriz Mahathir became the chairman and deputy president. The new party is focused on Bumiputera – Malays and Orang Asli – in the sense that full membership is only open to Bumiputera. Other races can join the party but cannot vote or contest in party elections. On 24 November 2023 during the 6th BERSATU annual general meeting (AGM), Muhyiddin, as the 1st and founding President of BERSATU, announced that he would not defend his party presidency at the next party elections in 2024. His announcement was unanimously rejected by the party supreme council and attracted strong opposition from the AGM delegates. The following day on 25 November 2023, he withdrew the decision and said he would defend his party presidency and serve another term as the party president after the persuasions of his wife.

== Minister of Home Affairs (2018–2020) ==
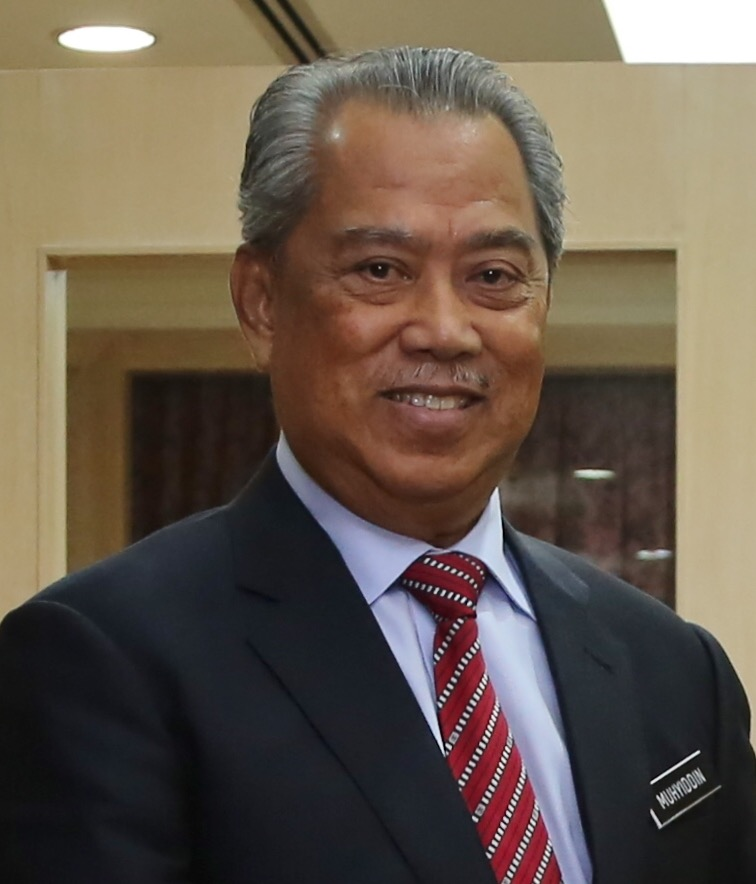
Muhyiddin in 2018

He was appointed as Malaysian Minister of Home Affairs by Prime Minister Mahathir Mohamad when Pakatan Harapan won the 14th General Election.

On 22 May 2018, Muhyiddin announced The Home Ministry will review seven laws relating to national security that were no longer suitable in today’s landscape. He said these laws were the Printing Presses and Publications Act 1984, Sedition Act 1948, Peaceful Assembly Act 2012, Prevention of Crime Act 1959 (Poca), Security Offences (Special Measures) Act 2012 (Sosma), Prevention of Terrorism Act 2015 (Pota), and mandatory death sentence.

On 16 to 21 September 2019, Muhyiddin visited the United States to boost security ties.

== Prime Minister (2020–2021) ==
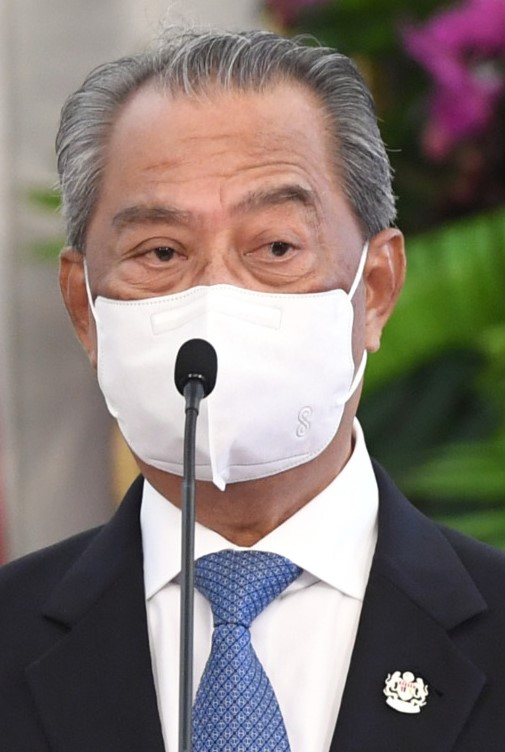
- Muhyiddin in 2021
- Muhyiddin Yassin; 31 March 2020 – 16 August 2021
- Monarch: Abdullah
- Prime Minister: Muhyiddin Yassin
- Cabinet: Muhyiddin I
- Party: PN–BERSATU
- Seat: Seri Perdana

In February 2020, Muhyiddin withdrew Bersatu from the ruling coalition, sparking a political crisis. On 29 February 2020, a week after the crisis began, Muhyiddin was appointed Prime Minister by the King of Malaysia, following the abrupt resignation of Mahathir Mohamad five days before. He did this by crafting a new political coalition including UMNO, the Malaysian Islamic Party, and some smaller Sarawak-based parties. This new government was unstable, and the political crisis continued after Muhyiddin's appointment. He is the first person appointed to the position while holding both a parliamentary and state seat at the same time.

=== COVID-19 pandemic and movement control order ===
During his administration, COVID-19 spread throughout the nation. In response, Muhyiddin implemented the Movement Control Order (MCO) on 16 March 2020 to prevent the disease from infecting more Malaysians. The MCO started nationwide from 18 March and was extended conditionally to 9 June 2020. In response to the economic impact of COVID-19, he introduced an economic stimulus package worth RM 250 billion on 27 March to soften the economic strain during the MCO.

On 1 May, in conjunction with Labour Day, Muhyiddin announced a Conditional Movement Control Order (CMCO). Certain economic sectors were allowed to operate gradually as long as SOP are followed. Travel restrictions are partially lifted to allow stranded students staying on their campuses and people who are stuck in other states to return to their respective home. Sports, recreational, and large gatherings are still prohibited under the CMCO.

On 10 May, it was announced that the CMCO will last for another four weeks until 9 June. More sectors will be allowed to operate and fewer restrictions are to be applied. Shopping malls, dine-in and non-contact sports are allowed as long as social distancing is observed.

The CMCO was converted into Recovery Movement Control Order (RMCO) and ran from 10 June until 31 August. Under the RMCO, more restrictions will be relaxed to allow the public to carry out their daily activities while complying with standard operating procedures. Almost all social, religious, business, and educational activities are allowed to resume. Hair salons, morning and night markets, and sports-related businesses like gymnasiums will open on a staggered basis, as well as religious congregation such as prayers as long as strict SOPs are followed. Reflexology centres, nightclubs, theme parks, karaoke centres, and gatherings such as kenduri (feasts) are still barred during the RMCO.

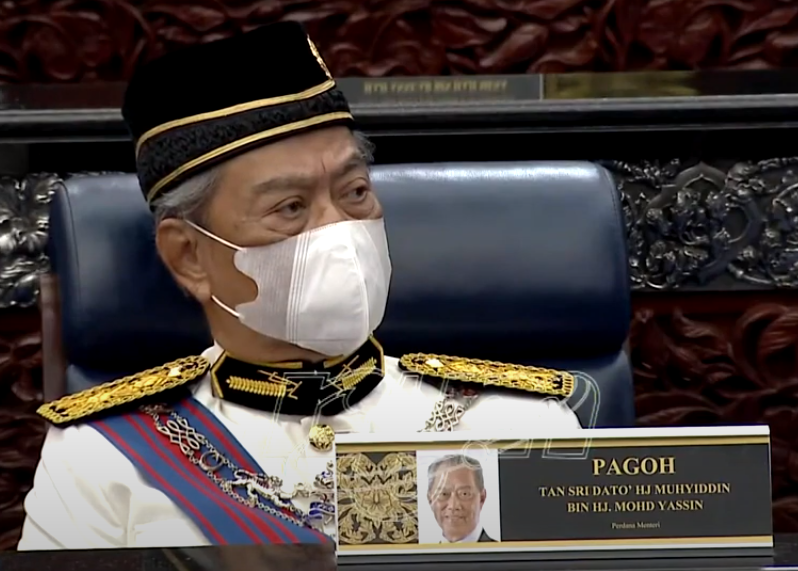
Muhyiddin in parliament on 18 May 2020.

The government's COVID-19 response had a 93% approval rating in September 2020, with 69% approval for Muhyiddin himself.

Until early September 2020, Malaysia had a low number of COVID-19 cases. Infections rose following the 2020 Sabah state election in September, leading to a surge in Sabah which spread to the Klang Valley area. However, unlike the initial promise to reinstate the Movement Control Order (MCO) if the case returns to 3 digits, the government only imposed the Conditional Movement Control Order (CMCO) under the name of "economy". The government did not impose the MCO until January 2021. Nevertheless, the "MCO 2.0", was criticised by health experts for being not as strict as the "MCO 1.0" from March to May 2020.

The government's mismanagement of the second and third waves provoked widespread anger among Malaysians, such as hashtags like "#KerajaanGagal" (means Failed Government) and/or "#MuhyiddinOut" which trended online. During the third wave in the mid 2021, a "Black Flag Campaign (Bendera Hitam)" became a trend, urging Muhyiddin to immediately resign.

On 31 July 2021, hundreds of protesters gathered in Kuala Lumpur calling for Muhyiddin's resignation over his government's response to the pandemic.

=== Foreign relations ===
==== Myanmar ====
After a bilateral meeting, Muhyiddin and Indonesian President Joko Widodo called for a special meeting of ASEAN on Myanmar after the 2021 coup d'état. After the April 2021 meeting, where representatives from the deposed National League for Democracy did not attend, Muhyiddin announced that Malaysia's three proposals to Min Aung Hlaing were not rejected, including calls to end violence against civilians during the 2021 Burmese protests, release of political detainees, and allow the Chair of ASEAN access to Myanmar.

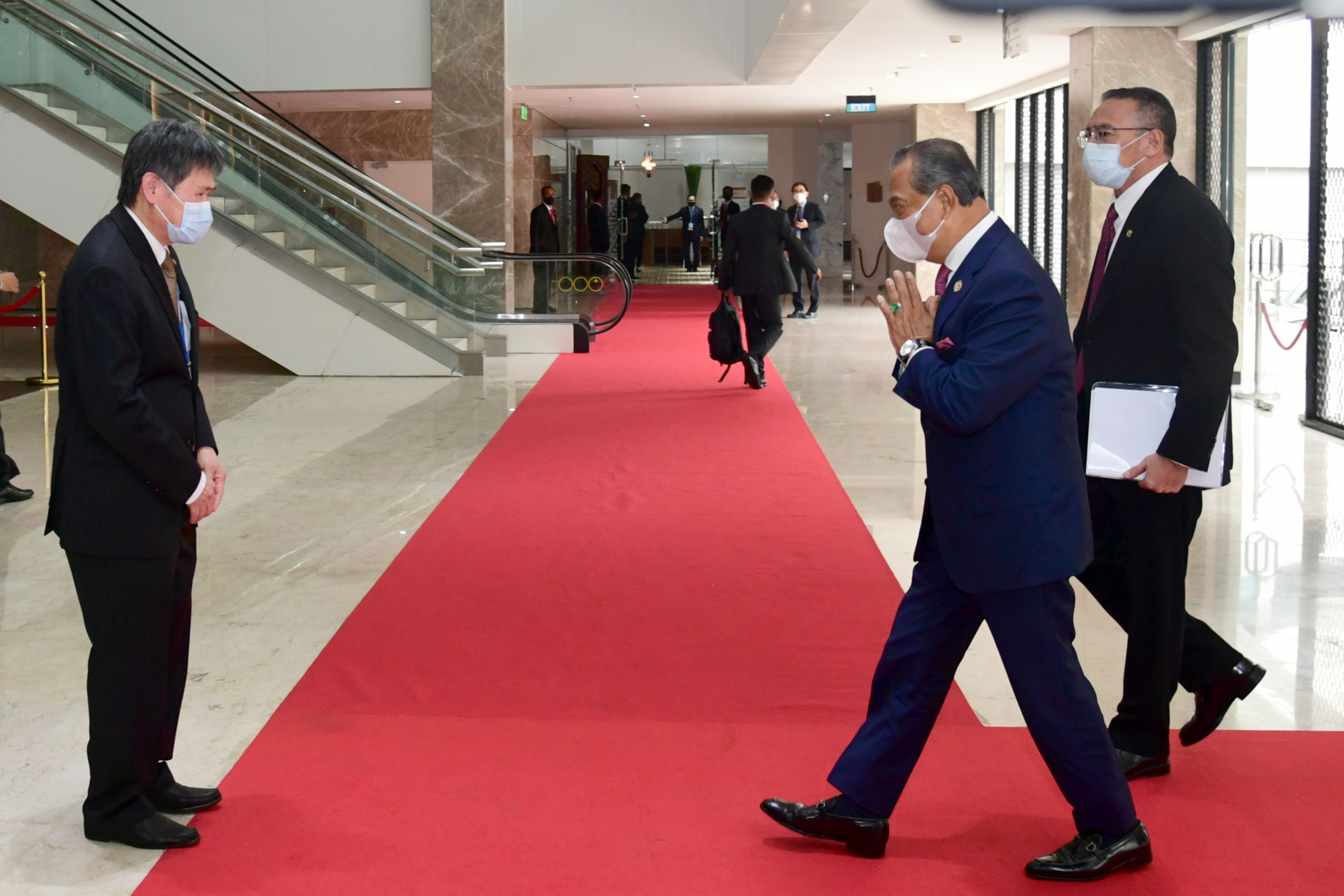
Prime Minister Muhyiddin Yassin and Foreign Minister Hishammuddin Hussein were greeted by ASEAN Secretary General Lim Jock Hoi on 24 April 2021.

=== Proclamation of emergency ===
On 19 October 2020, the Yang di-Pertuan Agong Sultan Abdullah of Pahang rejected Muhyiddin's request for him to issue a proclamation of emergency in response to a spike in COVID-19 cases throughout the country. However, on 21 January 2021, a new request to issue a proclamation of emergency was granted by the Yang di-Pertuan Agong, and is expected to last until 1 August. Parliament and all elections were suspended while the proclamation was in effect.

=== Loss of majority support and resignation ===
On 8 July 2021, UMNO withdrew support for Muhyiddin and called for his resignation in July 2021 over the handling of the COVID-19 pandemic. As well as a failure to prevent a record rise in COVID-19 infections and deaths, UMNO President Ahmad Zahid Hamidi cited the management of the severe economic impact, lack of political stability and extension of the Movement Control Order in his call for Muhyiddin to make way for a new interim premier.

On 4 August 2021, Putrajaya, Muhyiddin Yassin submitted a motion of confidence to the Yang di Pertuan Agong of Malaysia stating that he had received numerous declarations which provided that he still had the majority support within the lower house of parliament Dewan Rakyat. Therefore, the action of resignation under the Federal Constitution of Malaysia under section 43(4) is neither valid nor legal. He stated that the motion of no confidence would take place in September if the parliament had doubts about his ruling. However, this statement has been rejected by opposition leader Anwar Ibrahim who claims that 112 or more MPs have rejected Perikatan Nasional. Therefore, Anwar Ibrahim's statement concludes that Muyhiddin's claims are not valid and potentially fraudulent.

Following Anwar Ibrahim's statement, on 6 August 2021, Muhyiddin stated during a press conference in Pagoh, Johor that he is still confident that he still holds majority support within the Parliament.

On 15 August 2021, Mohd Redzuan Md Yusof, the Minister of the Prime Minister's Department (Special Functions), stated that Muhyiddin would resign on the next day. Muhyiddin and his cabinet submitted their resignation to the king on Monday, 16 August 2021.

== Post-premiership (2021–present) ==
=== Chairman of the National Recovery Council ===
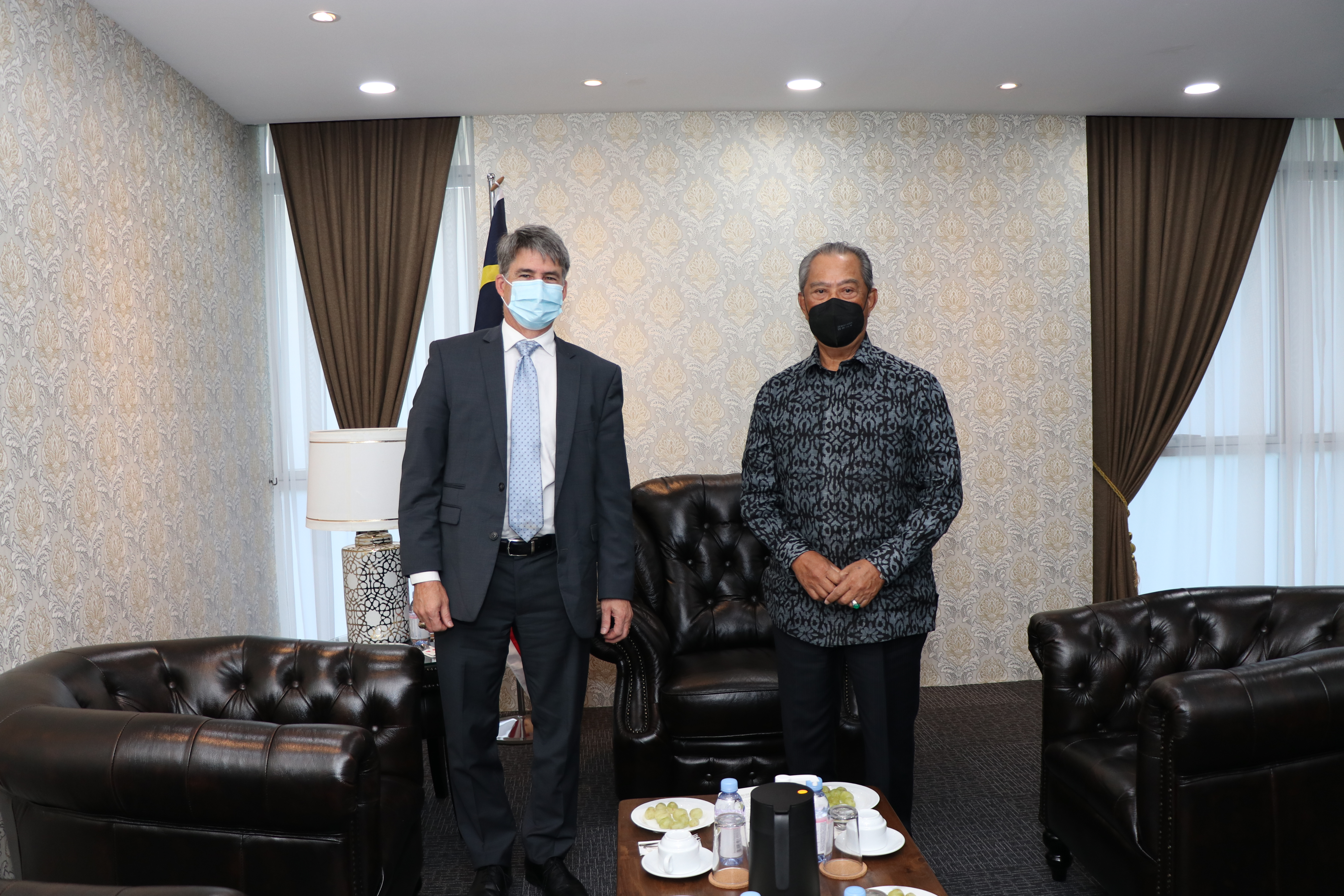
Muhyiddin with US Ambassador Brian McFeeters on 2 December 2021.

On 4 September 2021, Chief Secretary to the Government Mohd Zuki Ali announced that Muhyiddin had been appointed as Chairman of the National Recovery Council (NRC), a Cabinet minister-level position and highest position in the important council in charge of the recovery efforts of the COVID-19 pandemic based on confidence of the government in the ability of Muhyiddin in spearheading the COVID-19 pandemic recovery strategies. On 21 December 2022, Prime Minister Anwar Ibrahim dissolved NRC due to its redundancy and overlapping of duties, tasks and functions with other government agencies.

=== 15th Malaysian general election ===
Perikatan Nasional announced Muhyiddin Yassin as its candidate for prime minister ahead of the 15th Malaysian general election, which was held on 19 November 2022. In the election, Perikatan Nasional won 73 seats out of 222 seats, below the 112 seats needed for a majority. After the election, Muhyiddin claimed to have a sufficient majority to be appointed as the prime minister, citing support from Perikatan Nasional, Barisan Nasional, Gabungan Parti Sarawak, and Gabungan Rakyat Sabah. On 22 November, the royal palace stated that after the Yang di-Pertuan Agong reviewed the nominations for prime minister, he found that "no member of parliament has the majority support to be appointed prime minister", so he summoned both Muhyiddin and Anwar Ibrahim, the prime minister candidate from the rival coalition Pakatan Harapan, to see him. After the meeting, Muhyiddin said that the Yang di-Pertuan Agong proposed a unity government between Pakatan Harapan and Perikatan Nasional, but he rejected it as Perikatan Nasional "will not cooperate" with Pakatan Harapan.

Anwar Ibrahim was later appointed and sworn in as Malaysia's 10th Prime Minister on 24 November 2022, with the consent of Yang di-Pertuan Agong, Al-Sultan Abdullah, after a consultation with the Conference of Rulers of Malaysia. However, Muhyiddin continued to insist that he had the support of a majority of 115 MPs to form the next government and called on Anwar to prove his majority.

In early 2023, Muhyiddin was charged with corruption and money laundering. He offered his resignation as Malaysian United Indigenous Party (Bersatu) president, but this was rejected by the party. Amid rumours of likely internal challenges to Muhyiddin's leadership of Bersatu, Muhyidden announced he would not continue as president during the November 2023 party conference. However, he reversed this position the next day.

In September 2025, Bersatu announced Muhyiddin would be their candidate for prime minister in the next national election, despite internal disputes and some support for Muhyidden to be replaced by his deputy, Hamzah Zainudin. Hamzah publicly claimed that Muhyiddin intended to hand over the presidency at some point. On 10 November a court scheduled Muhyidden's corruption case to proceed from March 2026.

On 30 December 2025 Muhyiddin announced he would be stepping down as president of Perikatan Nasional (PN) from 1 January 2026. This was followed by others announcing their resignations, including secretary-general Azmin Ali, Johor PN chief Sahruddin Jamal, Perak PN chief Ahmad Faizal Azumu, and Negeri Sembilan PN chief Mohamad Hanifah Abu Baker. This followed the 2025 Perlis political crisis. Marzuki Mohamad later stated that several members of the Malaysian Islamic Party called for Muhyidden to resign in internal communications on 29 December.

== Controversies and issues ==
=== Alleged misuse of RMAF helicopter ===
Muhyiddin, as the Deputy Prime Minister, has used a RMAF Nuri helicopter to attend and open UMNO's divisional assembly in the interior of Sabah, which has nothing to do with his official duties. His actions have been strongly criticized by the federal opposition led by Lim Kit Siang as it was a misuse of his powers as deputy prime minister. Lim even questioned whether the Malaysian Anti-Corruption Commission (MACC) would investigate Muhyiddin, as MACC has been conducting various investigations into assemblymen in states controlled by Lim's Pakatan Rakyat.

=== Racial views ===
On 31 March 2010, Muhyiddin attracted controversy declaring himself as a "Malay first" rather than a "Malaysian first" when responding to Democratic Action Party (DAP) leader Lim Kit Siang's challenge in the parliament for him to state whether he is a Malay or a Malaysian first. However, Muhyiddin retorted although he is Malay first, that doesn't mean he being Malay is not Malaysian. The Prime Minister Najib Razak defended Muhyiddin's "Malay first, Malaysian second" assertion and controversial statement even though it contradicts the 1Malaysia concept which talks of "a nation where, it is hoped, every Malaysian perceives himself or herself as Malaysian first, and by race, religion, geographical region or socio-economic background second".

Muhyiddin attracted criticism again on 12 April 2010 by calling the members of a new inter-faith committee 'small fry', causing strong reaction from the public and uproar from the Malaysian Consultative Council of Buddhism, Christianity, Hinduism, Sikhism and Taoism (MCCBCHST) to back off from joining the committee for the time being. Muhyiddin was quick to deny he ever say that and stated he was misquoted. Muhyiddin later doubled down and uttered 'Yes, I am Malay first and no apologies'.

=== Legal name dispute ===
On 2 April 2021, the Shah Alam court has reversed a preventive detention order signed by him during his time as the Minister of Home Affairs because he signed the order using his unofficial name, Muhyiddin bin Mohd Yassin instead of his legal name/birth name, Mahiaddin bin Md Yasin.

=== Involvement in the Sheraton Move ===
Following political infighting within Pakatan Harapan, BERSATU President Muhyiddin Yassin, PAS President Abdul Hadi Awang, PKR Deputy President Azmin Ali, and UMNO leaders Ahmad Zahid Hamidi and Ismail Sabri Yaakob formed the Perikatan Nasional government which led to a loss of parliamentary majority for the ruling Pakatan Harapan coalition, ultimately resulting in Mahathir Mohamad's resignation as prime minister. This moment is widely regarded as the start of the Malaysian political crisis. Following its formation, the Perikatan Nasional government was the target of scathing criticism, with many calling its existence "democratically illegitimate" or more colloquially, a "backdoor government".

=== "Christianisation" claim ===
During a campaign speech on 17 November 2022, Muhyiddin accused Pakatan Harapan of working with Jews and Christians to "Christianise the country". He backed his claim by saying "I saw a video where a group of Jews were talking about Malaysia and were praying for the country to fall into the hands of the opposition, which has been sponsoring these groups of Jews and Christians. For me this is dangerous. Is a Christianisation process going to happen?". His remarks was condemned as religiously insensitive by the Council of Churches of Malaysia. Muhyiddin defended himself and claimed that he was taken out of context by saying that his speech was 55 minutes long, and that the remark was only 1 minute and 35 seconds long. He also claimed he was merely commenting on a supposed video clip that allegedly showed "foreign religious groups" praying for Pakatan Harapan to win. Such a thing made Bersatu Sabah members leave the party and declare the dissolution of Bersatu Sabah organization because of sensitive religious issues made by the president of the party. Sabah is a multi-racial state just like Sarawak and Hajiji Noor (Chairman of Bersatu Sabah) strongly rejected and protested the statement of the president of Bersatu, Muhyiddin Yassin. Accordingly, Hajiji Noor and members of Bersatu Sabah announced to leave Muhyiddin's party and migrate to existing local parties. They confirmed to migrate all Bersatu Sabah leadership to Parti Gagasan Rakyat Sabah, one of the component parties in GRS and one of the multi-racial parties in Sabah (a party that formerly under Ationg Tituh and Stephen Jacob Jimbangan leadership).

=== 2023 corruption charges ===
On 9 March 2023, Muhyiddin was detained by the Malaysian Anti-Corruption Commission after being questioned over a COVID-19 economic recovery package launched by his government. Muhyiddin denied the allegations. He was accused of sourcing $51m in bribes from companies who hoped to benefit from the emergency government spending program, and charged with gratification and money laundering. He allegedly abused his position for gratification from three entities and an individual for his ally, Bersatu. He pleaded not guilty on the charges. Judge Azura then fixed bail at RM2mil in two sureties and ordered Muhyiddin to surrender his passport. The case is being viewed by many Malaysians as a result of intense political rivalry which emerged after the defeat of Malaysia's incumbent political party, UMNO, in the 2018 Malaysian general election.

On 15 August 2023, the High Court has discharged and acquitted Muhyiddin of four charges involving abuse of power to obtain a RM232.5mil gratification for Bersatu. Justice Muhammad Jamil Hussin said all four charges were defective, baseless and vague. Muhyiddin claimed he knew the aforementioned charges were politically motivated from the very beginning and insisted he has not committed any wrongdoings under the law.

On 28 February 2024, a panel of the Court of Appeal comprising Judges Datuk Hadhariah Syed Ismail, Datuk Azmi Ariffin, and Datuk S.M. Komathy Suppiah allowed the prosecution's appeal to reinstate four charges of abuse of power and ordered the case to be returned to the Kuala Lumpur Sessions Court.

=== 2024 sedition charge ===
On 27 August 2024, Muhyiddin pleaded not guilty in the Sessions Court to charges of uttering seditious statements during the Nenggiri state assembly by-election campaign. He faced accusations related to remarks made at an open area near Semai Bakti Felda Perasu Hall, Gua Musang, on 14 August 2024. The charge involves his claim that he was not invited by the Yang di-Pertuan Agong, Al-Sultan Abdullah Ri'ayatuddin Al-Mustafa Billah Shah, to be sworn in as the prime minister, despite allegedly having support from 115 out of 222 MPs at the time. The case is being prosecuted under Section 4(1)(b) of the Sedition Act 1948. During the court proceedings, the prosecution proposed a bail amount of RM20,000. However, Muhyiddin's defense team requested a reduction, citing precedent cases under the same section. The court ultimately set bail at RM5,000 with one surety and scheduled the next hearing for 4 November 2024.

== Personal life ==
=== Family ===
He married Noorainee Abdul Rahman in 1972 and has 4 children; 2 sons and 2 daughters, namely Fakhri Yassin Mahiaddin, Nabilah Mahiaddin, Najwa Mahiaddin and Farhan Yassin Mahiaddin respectively. All of his children are heavily involved in business and corporate, entertainment or writing industries. His son, Fakhri Yassin, was a corporate figure in Malaysia and assumed the position of Executive Chairman. The second child, Nabilah was involved in book writing while Najwa and Farhan Yassin shared the same interest in the entertainment industry.

In 2003, Muhyiddin's daughter, Nabilah, married Muhamad Adlan Berhan. The wedding reception was attended by Prime Minister Mahathir Mohamad and his wife, Siti Hasmah Mohamad Ali.

=== Sport ===
He is an avid golf lover.

=== Health issues ===
In the aftermath of 2018 general election (GE14), Muhyiddin was diagnosed with an early-stage tumour in the pancreas. He had spent one month in Mount Elizabeth Hospital, Singapore from July to August 2018, during which he underwent a surgery to extract the tumour. The operation was successful and he returned to Malaysia in stable condition. He was scheduled for a series of follow-up chemotherapy treatment after Hari Raya Haji, for up to six months. He told reporters at the Parliament, "for cancer cases such as this, it is normal to go through follow-up treatment including chemotherapy for 12 rounds over the duration of six months."

Based on medical advice, Muhyiddin took a one-month medical leave to recover post-surgery. Prime Minister Mahathir Mohamad took charge of the Ministry of Home Affairs during Muhyiddin's absence.

On 22 May 2020, Muhyiddin entered into a 14-day quarantine after an officer who attended the post-Cabinet meeting at the Prime Minister's Office on 21 May tested positive for COVID-19. On 4 June 2020, he completed the 14-day quarantine period and was tested negative for COVID-19. Therefore, he was allowed to return to the workplace to discharge his official duties as prime minister.

On 9 February 2022, he confirmed that he had tested positive for COVID-19, was experiencing mild symptoms and would be undergoing quarantine.

== Election results ==
Parliament of Malaysia
Year	Constituency	Candidate	Votes	Pct	Opponent(s)	Votes	Pct	Ballots cast	Majority	Turnout
1978	P104 Pagoh	Muhyiddin Yassin (UMNO)	17,679	89.52%	Abd Wahab Abd Rahman (PAS)	2,069	10.48%	19,748	15,610	75.08%
1982	P104 Pagoh	Muhyiddin Yassin (UMNO)	19,035	83.05%	Sumadi Ahmad (PAS)	2,652	11.57%	22,921	16,383	74.86%
1995	P127 Pagoh	Muhyiddin Yassin (UMNO)	21,856	83.70%	Rosdan Taha Abd Rahman (S46)	4,257	16.30%	27,492	17,599	70.68%
1999	P127 Pagoh	Muhyiddin Yassin (UMNO)	20,132	73.35%	Alias Shamsir (keADILan)	7,282	26.53%	28,327	12,850	71.19%
2004	P143 Pagoh	Muhyiddin Yassin (UMNO)	23,679	82.64%	Mohamed Awang (PAS)	4,932	17.21%	29,534	18,747	65.43%
2008	P143 Pagoh	Muhyiddin Yassin (UMNO)	21,028	71.22%	Mohamad Rozali Jamil (PAS)	8,447	28.61%	30,313	12,581	75.70%
2013	P143 Pagoh	Muhyiddin Yassin (UMNO)	26,274	66.01%	Mohamad Rozali Jamil (PAS)	13,432	33.75%	40,612	12,842	86.79%
2018	P143 Pagoh	Muhyiddin Yassin (BERSATU)	23,558	55.21%	Ismail Mohamed (UMNO)	16,631	38.97%	42,672	6,927	82.83%
2018	P143 Pagoh	Muhyiddin Yassin (BERSATU)	23,558	55.21%	Ahmad Nawfal Mahfodz (PAS)	2,483	5.82%	42,672	6,927	82.83%
2022	P143 Pagoh	Muhyiddin Yassin (BERSATU)	24,986	45.94%	Iskandar Shah Abdul Rahman (PKR)	14,979	27.54%	54,391	10,007	77.77%
2022	P143 Pagoh	Muhyiddin Yassin (BERSATU)	24,986	45.94%	Razali Ibrahim (UMNO)	14,426	26.52%	54,391	10,007	77.77%

Johor State Legislative Assembly
Year	Constituency	Candidate	Votes	Pct	Opponent(s)	Votes	Pct	Ballots cast	Majority	Turnout
1986	N05 Bukit Serampang	Muhyiddin Yassin (UMNO)	Unopposed							
1990	N05 Bukit Serampang	Muhyiddin Yassin (UMNO)	9,260	80.52%	Omar Lambak (S46)	2,240	19.48%	11,911	7,020	76.31%
2018	N09 Gambir	Muhyiddin Yassin (BERSATU)	10,280	53.33%	Asojan Muniyandy (MIC)	7,192	37.31%	19,278	3,088	84.83%
2018	N09 Gambir	Muhyiddin Yassin (BERSATU)	10,280	53.33%	Mahfodz Mohamed (PAS)	1,806	5.63%	19,278	3,088	84.83%

== Honours ==
=== Honours of Malaysia ===
- Malaysia
  - Commander of the Order of Loyalty to the Crown of Malaysia (PSM) – Tan Sri (1988)
  - Recipient of the 8th Yang di-Pertuan Agong Installation Medal (1984)
  - Recipient of the 16th Yang di-Pertuan Agong Installation Medal (2019)
  - Recipient of the 17th Yang di-Pertuan Agong Installation Medal (2024)
- Johor
  - Knight Grand Commander of the Order of the Crown of Johor (SPMJ) – Dato' (1991)
  - Companion of the Order of the Crown of Johor (SMJ) (1980)
  - Second Class of the Sultan Ibrahim Medal (PIS II) (1974)
  - Second Class of the Star of Sultan Ismail (BSI II) (1979)
  - Recipient of Sultan Ibrahim Ismail Coronation Medal (2015)
- Kedah
  - Grand Commander of the Order of Loyalty to Sultan Abdul Halim Mu'adzam Shah (SHMS) – Dato' Seri Diraja (2014)
- Malacca
  - Knight Grand Commander of the Premier and Exalted Order of Malacca (DUNM) – Datuk Seri Utama (2019)
- Negeri Sembilan
  - Principal Grand Knight of the Order of Loyalty to Negeri Sembilan (SUNS) – Dato' Seri Utama (2010)
- Perak
  - Ordinary Class of the Perak Family Order of Sultan Azlan Shah (SPSA) – Dato' Seri Diraja (2010)
- Perlis
  - Knight Grand Commander of the Order of the Crown of Perlis (SPMP) – Dato' Seri (2007)
- Sabah
  - Grand Commander of the Order of Kinabalu (SPDK) – Datuk Seri Panglima (2010)
- Sarawak
  - Knight Grand Commander of the Order of the Star of Hornbill Sarawak (DP) – Datuk Patinggi (2010)
  - Knight Commander of the Order of the Star of Sarawak (PNBS) – Dato Sri (2008)

=== Honorary degrees ===
- China
  - Honorary Doctor of Letters (Litt.D.) degree from Beijing Foreign Studies University (2014)
- United States
  - 2012 International Honorary Doctorate from United States Sports Academy (2013)

=== Honorary plaque ===
- Bosnia
  - Honorary Plaque of the City of Sarajevo (2016)

== See also ==
- Pagoh (federal constituency)
- Ketuanan Melayu
- Malay Agenda
- Malaysian United Indigenous Party
- Perikatan Nasional
- Green Wave (Malaysia)

== Notes ==
Political offices
Preceded by Abdul Ajib Ahmad	Menteri Besar of Johor; 1986–1995	Succeeded by Abdul Ghani Othman
Preceded by Abdul Ghani Othman	Minister of Youth and Sports; 1995–1999	Succeeded by Hishammuddin Hussein
Preceded by Megat Junid Megat Ayob	Minister of Domestic Trade and Consumer Affairs; 1999–2004	Succeeded by Mohd Shafie Apdal
Preceded by Mohd Effendi Norwawi	Minister of Agriculture and Agro-based Industry; 2004–2008	Succeeded by Mustapa Mohamed
Preceded by Rafidah Aziz	Minister of International Trade and Industry; 2008–2009	Succeeded by Mustapa Mohamed; Ong Ka Chuan
Preceded by Hishammuddin Hussein	Minister of Education; 2009–2015	Succeeded by Mahdzir Khalid
Preceded by Ahmad Zahid Hamidi	Minister of Home Affairs; 2018–2020	Succeeded by Hamzah Zainudin
Preceded by Najib Razak	Deputy Prime Minister of Malaysia; 2009–2015	Succeeded by Ahmad Zahid Hamidi
Preceded by Mahathir Mohamad	Prime Minister of Malaysia; 2020–2021	Succeeded by Ismail Sabri Yaakob
Party political offices
Preceded by Najib Razak	Deputy President of the United Malays National Organisation; 2009–2015	Succeeded by Ahmad Zahid Hamidi
Preceded by Najib Razak	Deputy Chairman of Barisan Nasional; 2009–2015	Succeeded by Ahmad Zahid Hamidi
Preceded by New post	Deputy President of Pakatan Harapan; 2017–2020	Succeeded by Wilfred Madius Tangau
Preceded by New post	President of Parti Pribumi Bersatu Malaysia; 2016–present	Incumbent
Preceded by New post	Chairman of Perikatan Nasional; 2020–present	Incumbent
Parliament of Malaysia
Preceded by Syed Nasir Syed Ismail	Member of Parliament for Pagoh; 1978–1986	Succeeded by Ahmad Omar
Preceded by Ahmad Omar	Member of Parliament for Pagoh; 1995–present	Incumbent
