= 2008 Malaysian opposition wave =

Political phenomenon in Malaysia

The 2008 Malaysian Opposition Wave refers to a significant political shift that occurred during the 2008 Malaysian general election, held on 8 March 2008. This election, often described as a "political tsunami", marked a turning point in Malaysia’s political landscape. Both the ruling coalition, Barisan Nasional (BN), and the opposition coalition, Barisan Alternatif, which mainly comprised the Democratic Action Party (DAP), the People's Justice Party (PKR), and the Malaysian Islamic Party (PAS), experienced unexpected outcomes. Dissatisfaction with governance, rising crime rates, consumer-price inflation, and corruption highlighted during the election campaign contributed to a decline in BN's support, particularly in urban and minority communities. Adding to the mounting pressure on Prime Minister Abdullah Ahmad Badawi was public criticism from his predecessor, Mahathir Mohamad, who openly disapproved of Abdullah’s leadership and policy direction, further influencing public perception and party confidence. Anwar Ibrahim was instrumental in uniting the opposition and coordinating candidate placements to avoid multi-cornered contests, helping the opposition consolidate their votes. Their manifesto focused on reducing BN's two-thirds majority in Parliament and winning control of key northern states such as Perlis, Kedah, Penang, and Perak at the State Legislative Assembly (DUN) level, while retaining Kelantan under PAS’s control.

Beyond their initial targets, the opposition achieved significant success, gaining control of five states: Kelantan (retained by PAS), Kedah, Penang, Perak, and Selangor. Additionally, they dominated the Federal Territory of Kuala Lumpur, winning 10 out of 11 parliamentary seats. The opposition also made inroads in traditionally strong Barisan Nasional territories, securing several parliamentary seats in states such as Negeri Sembilan, Malacca, Johor, and Pahang. Losing five states and being left with only 140 parliamentary seats, put intense pressure on Prime Minister Abdullah Badawi, who was later asked to resign. This electoral shift reduced BN's dominance and altered Malaysia's political landscape, providing the opposition with a stronger platform to promote their reform agenda.

== Pre-election events ==
=== Kris wielding incident ===
In 2005, Hishammuddin Hussein's act of wielding a kris during the UMNO Youth General Assembly was perceived as controversial and reportedly offended segments of the Chinese community. This incident received widespread coverage in Chinese-language newspapers and criticism from opposition leaders. Despite the backlash, Hishammuddin repeated the act at UMNO General Assemblies in 2006 and 2007.

=== Hindraf protests ===
On 25 November 2007, protests organized by the Hindu Rights Action Force (HINDRAF) erupted in response to grievances against the UMNO-led government. This movement marked a significant shift in support among the Indian community, who overwhelmingly voted for opposition parties in the election. One notable outcome was the defeat of Malaysian Indian Congress (MIC) leader Samy Vellu, who lost his parliamentary seat to Michael Jeyakumar Devaraj of the Socialist Party of Malaysia (PSM), contesting under the People's Justice Party (PKR) banner during the 2008 general election, along with the loss of several other MIC-held seats to the opposition.

=== Port Klang Free Zone (PKFZ) scandal ===
The Port Klang Free Zone (PKFZ) scandal, involving RM4.6 billion, exposed alleged corruption within the Barisan Nasional power-sharing framework. Kuala Dimensi Sdn. Bhd. purchased the land from Koperasi Kemajuan Pulau Lumut for RM95 million in 1999 and later sold it to the Port Klang Authority for RM1.1 billion in 2003. Although the government could have acquired the land for RM10 per square foot under the National Land Code, it opted to purchase it for RM23 per square foot. Kuala Dimensi Sdn. Bhd. was subsequently appointed as the project contractor, with costs escalating to RM3.3 billion. Politicians from UMNO, SPDP, and a former MCA parliamentary secretary were implicated in various stages of the project.

== Opposition strategies ==
=== PAS strategy ===
PAS, traditionally supported by the Malay community, demonstrated adaptability by fielding prominent leaders to safeguard its stronghold in Kelantan. Leaders such as Mahfuz Omar and Salahuddin Ayub were strategically placed in Kedah and Kelantan respectively, while Nasharudin Mat Isa contested in Bachok against the Barisan Nasional candidate, Awang Adek. Independent candidate Ibrahim Ali, previously dismissed by UMNO, was backed by PAS in Pasir Mas. However, PAS miscalculated by fielding Mohamad Sabu in Kuala Terengganu, where he faced a strong local opponent.

=== DAP strategy ===
DAP capitalized on dissatisfaction among Chinese and Indian communities with certain UMNO leaders accused of making racially charged statements. Their campaign slogan, "A vote for Gerakan is a vote for UMNO," resonated with voters in Chinese-majority constituencies. DAP also strategically fielded candidates in areas with minimal Malay-majority voters.

=== PKR strategy ===
PKR adopted slogans such as "People's Supremacy" ("Ketuanan Rakyat") to attract urban and moderate Malay voters. As a multiethnic party with Chinese and Indian members, PKR successfully appealed to non-Malay voters. The party also highlighted issues of corruption within Barisan Nasional, including the VK Lingam case and the PKFZ scandal, as key campaign points.

== See also ==
- Political tsunami
- Green Wave (Malaysia)
