= Adam Loh Wei Chai =

Malaysian politician

Yang Berhormat Tuan Adam Loh Wei Chai MLA
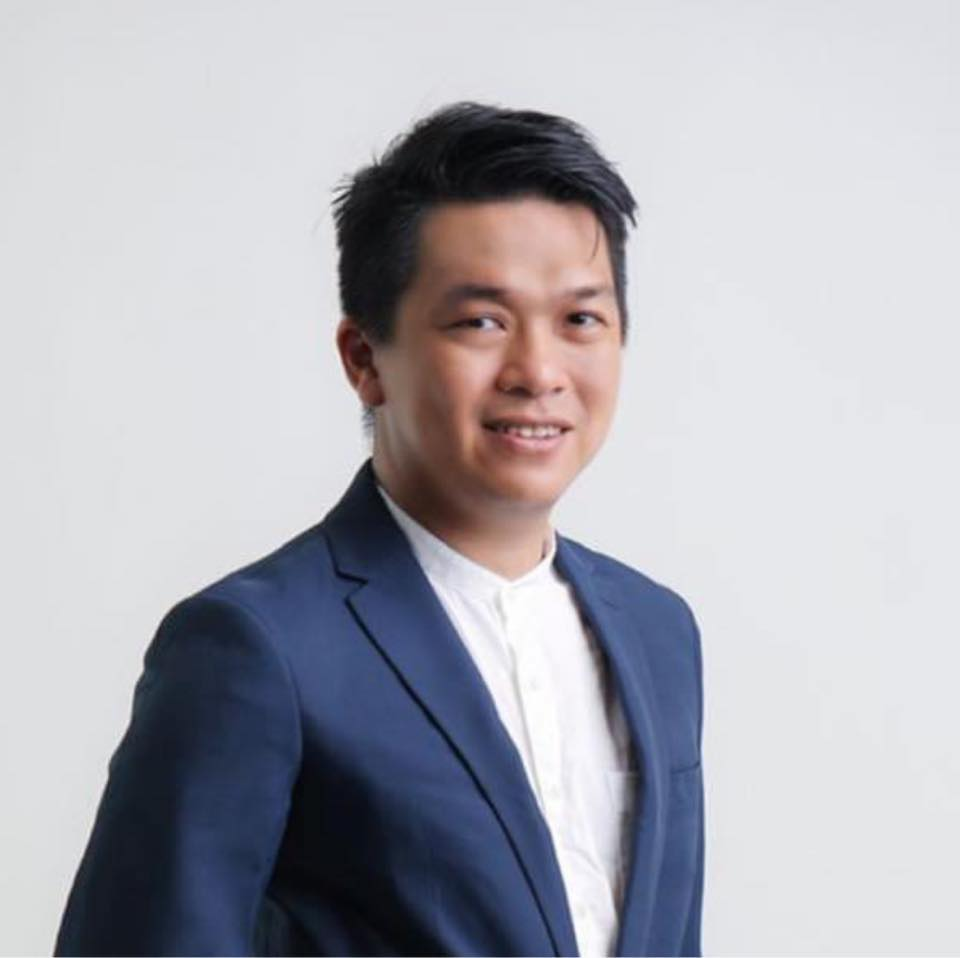

Member of the Kedah State Legislative Assembly for Bakar Arang
- Incumbent
- Assumed office 12 August 2023
- Preceded by: Simon Ooi Tze Min (PH–PKR)
- Majority: 3,863 (2023)

Personal details
- Born: 11 December 1987 (age 38)
- Citizenship: Malaysia
- Party: People's Justice Party (PKR)
- Other political affiliations: Pakatan Harapan (PH)
- Education: University of Southern Queensland
- Occupation: Politician

Adam Loh Wei Chai is a Malaysian politician who has served as Member of Kedah State Legislative Assembly for Bakar Arang since August 2023. He is a member of the People's Justice Party (PKR), a component party of the Pakatan Harapan (PH) coalition. Loh is widely recognized for his proactive community engagement and his advocacy for local issues in Kedah.

== Community Involvement and Social Support ==
Adam Loh is highly active in supporting his community, regularly providing assistance (bantuan) to those in need within Sungai Petani and nearby areas. His initiatives range from financial aid to community resources, reflecting his commitment to the welfare and development of his constituency. He is known for organizing educational workshops, sponsoring local sports teams, and promoting STEM education for young people in Sungai Petani.

== Advocacy and Controversies ==
Adam Loh’s vocal advocacy has also made him a prominent voice for local concerns, notably regarding issues impacting the quality of life in Kedah. He drew significant attention on TikTok after openly criticizing Menteri Besar of Kedah, Sanusi, for allegedly breaking promises to Kedahans regarding the construction of a new litar lumba (racing circuit), which had been a long-anticipated development in the state.

In addition, Loh has voiced the frustrations of Sungai Petani and Sungai Lalang residents affected by persistent water supply outages linked to the Loji Rawatan Air Bukit Selambau and Sungai Limau water treatment plants. His outspoken approach has positioned him as a key advocate for reliable infrastructure and services in Kedah, resonating with many locals who feel similarly affected by these issues.

== Election results ==
Kedah State Legislative Assembly
Year	Constituency	Candidate	Votes	Pct	Opponent(s)	Votes	Pct	Ballots cast	Majority	Turnout
2023	N28 Bakar Arang	Adam Loh Wei Chai (PKR)	21,889	54.41%	Raymond Tai Kuang Tee (Gerakan)	18,206	45.25%	40,504	3,683	69.99%
2023	N28 Bakar Arang	Adam Loh Wei Chai (PKR)	21,889	54.41%	Tan Kee Chye (PRM)	138	0.34%	40,504	3,683	69.99%
