= Political wave =

Political waves or wave elections may refer to:

- Wave elections in the United States
- Political tsunami, a term used in Malaysian politics
- Pink tide, a term used in Latin America
