= Muhammad Sanusi Md Nor controversies =

Controversies surrounding Muhammad Sanusi Md Nor

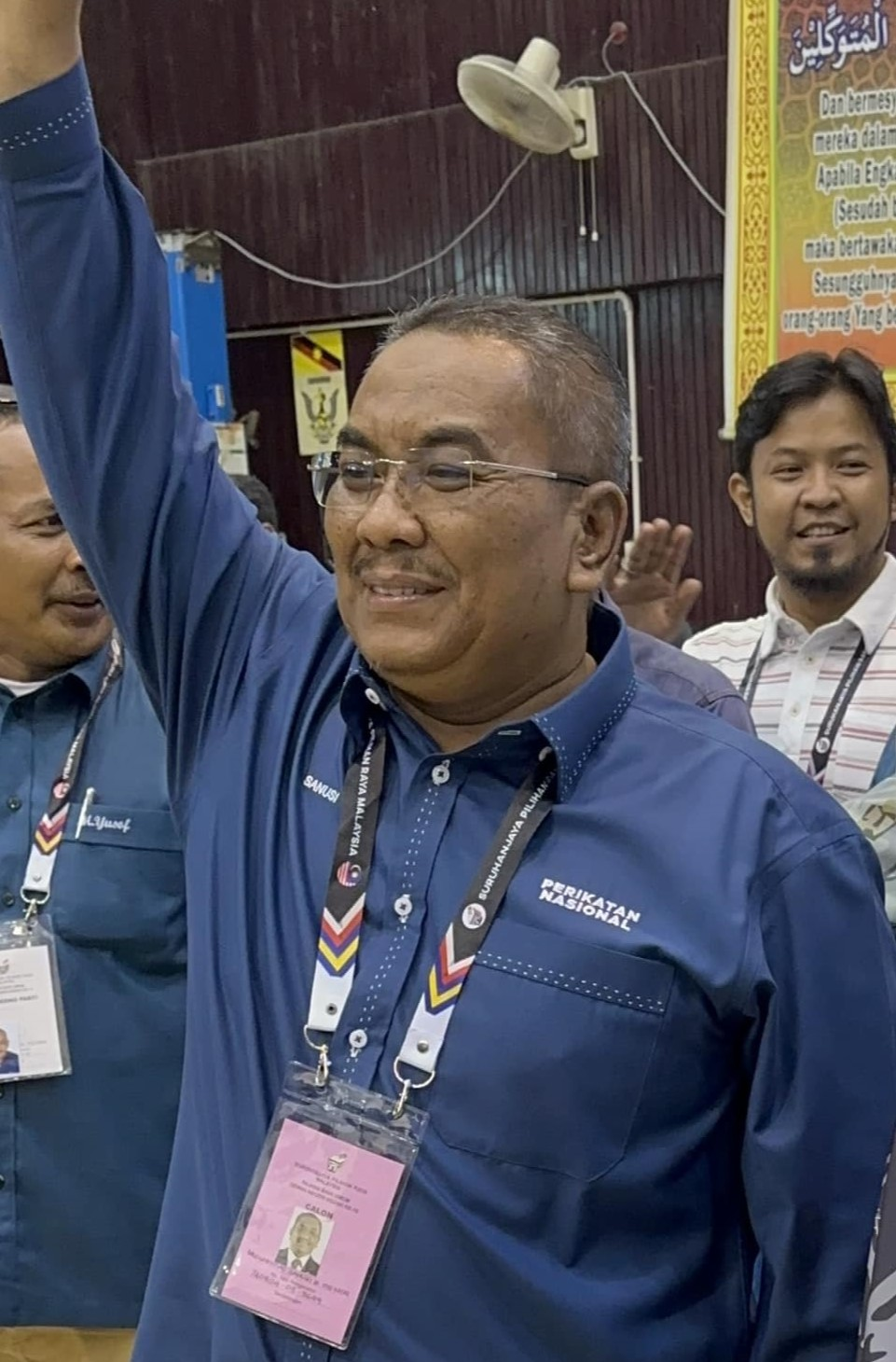
Muhammad Sanusi with his famous hand salute.

Muhammad Sanusi Md Nor, the 14th Menteri Besar of Kedah, has been a polarizing figure in Malaysia since assuming office in 2020, largely due to the numerous controversies surrounding his tenure.

== Rare-earth metal (REE) deposits ==
In early December 2020, Muhammad Sanusi Md Nor announced that the Kedah state government had granted a permit to a Kuala Lumpur-based company to prospect and extract rare earth metals valued at RM43 trillion. However, further investigation revealed that the deposits were only worth an estimated RM62 billion.

The Democratic Action Party (DAP) accused Muhammad Sanusi of intentionally courting controversies and being provocative to divert attention from the rare-earth deposit issue.

In October 2022, Kedah's Director of Lands and Mines issued a compound fine of RM500,000 to his administration over the alleged theft of rare earth minerals in Kampung Chong, Kedah.

In July 2023, fresh allegations emerged against Muhammad Sanusi, linking him to corruption related to the theft of rare earth elements (REE) in the Sik district. Subsequently, the Malaysian Anti-Corruption Commission (MACC) launched an investigation into the alleged theft.

== Incidents of racism ==
=== Alcoholism remarks ===
The media have criticized Muhammad Sanusi for his alleged derogatory remarks about minority communities, particularly the Indian community, linking them with alcoholism. In his speeches, he had stated that the opposition was "drunk on the toddy of popularity" without explicitly referencing any community. However, the statement sparked protests from minority groups, who demanded a public apology, as it was perceived to link alcoholism with certain communities.

Sanusi refused to apologize and instead called for a ban on the Malaysian Indian Congress (MIC) party. In response, the MIC chairman, Tan Sri Vigneswaran, remarked, "this is what happens when you pick an ignorant man to be [an] MB".

=== Football remarks ===
During a press conference for the Malaysian football club Kedah FA, Muhammad Sanusi, acting as the club's president, made racial remarks about its foreign players, referring to them as "Awang Hitam," which translates to "black man" (with Awang meaning "man" in Malay). The term is also considered derogatory, as it has been historically used by certain media outlets to identify African men in a negative context.

=== Demolition of Hindu Temples ===
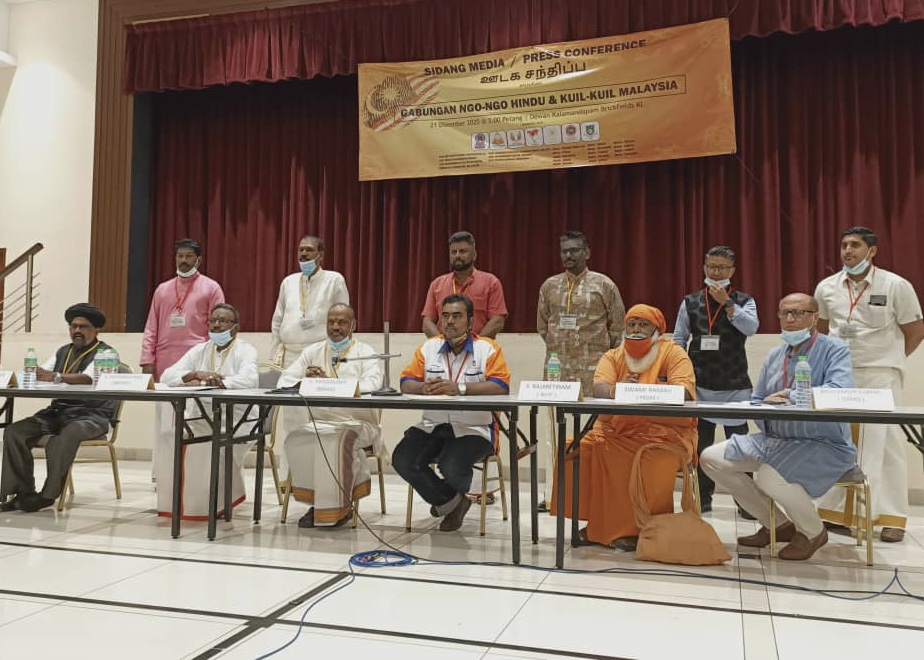
The press conference organized by the Hindu NGO Coalition requesting the minister to apologize for his statement and stop temple demolition works immediately.

Sanusi's administration enforced the demolition of illegally constructed Hindu temples, despite protests from the Indian community. This became a nationwide issue, with many political leaders, religious leaders, and NGO representatives criticizing his actions as insensitive toward Hindus. The Democratic Action Party (DAP) suggested that the real motive behind the demolitions was to divert attention from the earlier controversy surrounding rare earth deposits. However, some supported Sanusi's actions, arguing that the demolitions were carried out in accordance with the law.

The Coalition of Hindu NGOs urged Sanusi to halt the demolitions and issue a public apology, warning that they would escalate the matter to the Palace if their demands were ignored. During a press conference, the coalition representatives requested Sanusi to guarantee an immediate stop to the demolitions. Sanusi, however, responded that the actions were being carried out under the purview of the law.

Participants in the press conference called on the government to be more proactive, sensitive, and to establish a framework to protect the rights of the Hindu community in Malaysia. Navindran Palasendaram, president of the United Malaysian Hindu Voice (UMHV), declared the organization's willingness to collaborate with the government to find a permanent solution to the challenges faced by Hindu temples and communities.

=== 2026 "Tanah Melayu" campaign remarks controversy ===
During an election campaign speech in Jempol, Negeri Sembilan, on July 23, 2026, Kedah Menteri Besar and Perikatan Nasional (PN) election director Datuk Seri Muhammad Sanusi Md Nor generated political and legal controversy when he stated that non-Malay communities possessed ancestral homelands such as China and India, whereas ethnic Malays only had Tanah Melayu (Land of the Malays). The remarks drew strong criticism across the political spectrum, with political opponents and civil society groups accusing Sanusi of deploying divisive rhetoric touching on race, religion, and royalty (3R issues) and casting doubt on the national belonging of non-Malay Malaysian citizens. Following the incident, the Royal Malaysia Police (PDRM) opened an investigation into the speech under Section 505 of the Penal Code for statements conducive to public mischief and Section 233 of the Communications and Multimedia Act 1998. In response to the criticism, Sanusi defended his statements on July 27, 2026, maintaining that his reference to Tanah Melayu reflected historical terminology used in 1940s and 1950s British parliamentary debates and arguing that highlighting the historical homeland of the Malays did not deny or alter the constitutional rights and citizenship of non-Malay Malaysians. Concurrently, Sanusi issued a legal Letter of Demand (LOD) through his attorneys to Pakatan Harapan (PH) Selangor election director Dr. Sathia Prakash Nadarajan, alleging that Sathia had misrepresented his speech by falsely claiming Sanusi had instructed non-Malays to leave the country. Sathia subsequently acknowledged an error regarding the exact phrasing attributed to Sanusi, while stating that he stood by his interpretation regarding the implied political message of the campaign address.

== Water conflicts between Kedah and Penang ==
The Muda River forms a natural boundary between Kedah and the neighboring state of Penang. It serves as a crucial water catchment area for both states, with Penang sourcing over 80% of its raw water supply from the river.

In December 2020, Muhammad Sanusi threatened to dam and redirect the river away from Penang unless the Penang government paid Kedah RM50 million annually as compensation. Penang Chief Minister Chow Kon Yeow rejected the demand, citing the state's riparian rights. In response, Sanusi remarked that he would "get villagers to place sandbags to choke off the water supply to Penang."

Tensions between the two states escalated further in March 2021 when Sanusi again threatened that Penang would only receive "mud" instead of water and expressed his readiness to take the matter to court.

The ongoing dispute prompted Penang authorities to reduce the state's reliance on the Muda River. They began negotiating with Perak for alternative water sources, which resulted in an agreement for Perak to supply treated water from the Kerian River to Penang.

== Thaipusam holiday ==
On 21 January 2021, Muhammad Sanusi announced that the Thaipusam festival would not be marked as a public holiday in Kedah that year due to the spike in COVID-19 cases and the prohibition of public gatherings. He stated that state assembly service centers would be allowed to operate via drive-through services to serve people in their respective constituencies. Additionally, temple prayers during the festival would be permitted, but only one-third of devotees would be allowed to attend.

The Malaysian Chinese Association (MCA) described Sanusi's decision as illogical and disrespectful to the rights of the country's minority communities. Meanwhile, MIC Deputy President Datuk Seri M. Saravanan stated that the decision sent a negative message about PAS to all minorities in the country.

"He has planted the seed of fear in the minds of all minorities," remarked Vell Paari, former MIC secretary-general. He criticized the PAS central leadership for attempting to portray the party as inclusive while allowing such actions. He also condemned PAS for accusing MIC of not supporting the party during the 14th General Election (GE14) in 2018. Vell Paari reminded Sanusi that during GE14, PAS was not a component of the Barisan Nasional coalition.

== Arrests of critics and COVID-19 'Corpse Joke' ==
In August 2021, four individuals were arrested for allegedly insulting Muhammad Sanusi over his controversial "joke" about using freezer containers to store the corpses of COVID-19 victims. The first arrest involved a 61-year-old senior citizen who was detained at his home in Lenggeng, Negeri Sembilan, at 3:57 a.m. He was then transported to Sungai Petani, Kedah, over 400 kilometers away, following a police report lodged by Sanusi's special officer, Azizan Hamzah.

Two more individuals were arrested in Mergong Perdana and Kepala Batas after allegedly making offensive comments about Sanusi on Facebook. The fourth arrest was of an IT analyst from Taiping, whose pregnant wife publicly criticized the situation, saying, "I feel that you don’t need to be a MB if you cannot take criticism. Better to just sit down and look through FB comments all day."

The arrests and questioning of citizens for criticizing a publicly elected official drew widespread condemnation from the Malaysian public, the Centre for Independent Journalism, opposition politicians, and even a Federal Minister from the ruling government.

== Termination of 4-D lottery license ==
In November 2021, Muhammad Sanusi sparked another controversy when he announced that the renewal of 4D licenses in Kedah would be halted. He stated, "This move is to ensure that Kedah will be free from gambling." Additionally, he mocked the state of Penang, saying, "Those who want to buy (4-D lottery numbers) can go to Penang".

== 'Obscene Speech' in Penang ==
Jadi nak takut apa dengan PAS? Pi tengok di Kedah, mana ada satu Cina kita suruh potong lancau (this word was vulgar word), takdak!

Translation: So what is the reason to be afraid of PAS? Go and see in Kedah, none of the Chinese we ask to circumcise their (refers to male reproductive part in Hokkien dialect), there is none!

In early June, just weeks before the dissolution of the State Legislative Assembly in six states, including Kedah, Sanusi made a speech that sparked another controversy during his visit to a PN political talk program in Permatang Pauh. While addressing the crowd, he remarked that none of the Chinese men in Kedah were told to circumcise. A video of his speech, which went viral, showed that Sanusi used a term in the Hokkien dialect referring to the male reproductive organ.

As a result of his statement during the talks, hundreds of police reports were filed, citing the seriousness of the issue. Penang DAP Women's Chief and Sungai Pinang DAP state representative, Lim Siew Khim, lodged a police report at the Penang Northeast District station. She called for further action to be taken by the authorities against Sanusi for his inappropriate behavior and "foul jokes."

Another police report was filed by Penang DAP MP for Bukit Bendera and Seri Delima state representative, Syerleena Abdul Rashid, at the Dang Wangi District Police in Kuala Lumpur, accompanied by DAP MP for Bangi, Syahredzan Johan. She stated that Sanusi's remarks were disgusting, especially given that he was the state's most senior leader and should never have made such comments. Syerleena warned that the words spread by Sanusi during the political roadshow could have negative implications for society, as they could influence the audience—whether women, children, or even young people—in a harmful way.

The sole Pakatan Harapan PKR MP for Kedah, Dr Mohammed Taufiq Johari, criticized Sanusi's speech, calling it a reflection of poor behavior and even describing him as an illiterate and uncivilized leader. In a statement to the press, Dr. Taufiq emphasized that Sanusi's actions did not represent the people of Kedah, who should not be associated with such behavior. He clarified that Kedahans are not rude, as politeness and good manners are integral parts of their culture. Dr. Taufiq also urged Sanusi to set a better example as a senior leader, given that Sanusi held a more senior position than him.

== Claiming Penang as part of Kedah ==
At a ceremony celebrating the boundary delineation between Kedah and Perlis in May 2023, Muhammad Sanusi, in a fit of revanchism, claimed that "Penang belongs to Kedah." He stated, "There is no such thing as the Kedah-Penang border. Our state border ends near the island there (Balik Pulau). How can it (Kedah-Penang border) be measured? Which gazette should we use?"

Sanusi's claim that Penang belonged to Kedah sparked an uproar in Penang. Penang Chief Minister Chow Kon Yeow threatened to take Sanusi "to court over the matter," while Chow's predecessor, Lim Guan Eng, and Jelutong MP RSN Rayer filed police reports against Sanusi. A motion raised by Lim, the elected representative for Air Putih, condemning Sanusi was passed in the Penang Legislative Assembly. Lim also warned that Sanusi's revanchism was motivated by the upcoming election that year. Prime Minister Anwar Ibrahim, who hails from Penang, criticized Sanusi for failing to understand the constitution, which defines Penang as a sovereign state.

In response, Sanusi initially claimed that he had been misquoted by the media, and later stated that he was merely attempting to "correct the history that had been exploited since the British occupation." In July 2024, he announced that a Kedah team would present their findings on the historical status of Kedah and Penang by December. In reply, Chief Minister Chow Kon Yeow rejected Sanusi's claims, urging him to accept that Penang is an independent state.

== Disputing Selangor's development ==
In July 2023, Muhammad Sanusi claimed that Selangor's development was only possible because it surrounds Kuala Lumpur and that it could not be considered "an exemplary PH state." He also stated that if it were his state, Kedah, surrounding Kuala Lumpur instead of Selangor, Kedah would also reap the economic benefits.

Former Kapar MP Manivannan Gowindasamy retorted that Kedah would have been more developed if it had been led by a Menteri Besar like Selangor's Amirudin Shari for a full term. Former Dusun Tua representative Edry Faizal reminded Sanusi that Kedah borders Penang but still lags behind in economic development. He urged Sanusi to focus on developing his own state rather than claiming that Penang belongs to Kedah. Edry added, "Selangor is lucky not to have a leader like Sanusi. Otherwise, he would want to lay claim to Kuala Lumpur as well".

Amirudin also joined in the condemnations of Sanusi, cynically questioning his policies and offering to share leadership tips when he visits Kedah. "Kedah is next to Penang, but what is the impact? Penang has the highest economic position after Selangor and Kuala Lumpur, but Kedah is still contributing below five percent to the gross domestic product," Amirudin said.

As late as February 2024, Sanusi continued to express his disdain for Selangor and Kuala Lumpur, stating, "without those two, Kedah would be number one in terms of investment."

== Remarks about the Selangor Sultan ==
Hebatnya Sultan Kedah ni, bukan koman koman. Sultan tara tu angpa bayang, hang tengok Menteri (Besaq) la ni. Sultan hebat lagu tu tak akan pilih Menteri Besaq cokia macam Amir tu. Inci pun tak berapa cukup.

Translation: How amazing the Sultan of Kedah is, not an ordinary (entity/power). Can you just imagine the great Sultan, see the current Mentri Besar (me). The great Sultan (Kedah) like that won't elect a useless Mentri Besar just like that Amir (Amirudin Shari). He's unfit for duties.

On the night of 11 July 2023, during a political talk in Selayang, a town in the District of Gombak, Selangor, ahead of the upcoming 2023 Malaysian state elections, Muhammad Sanusi reportedly belittled and drew a comparison between the Kedah and Selangor sultans. He claimed that the Kedah ruler would not have appointed Amirudin Shari as the Menteri Besar. His statement sparked outrage nationwide, particularly among Selangorians, as the Malay Royal Institutions are meant to be respected, as outlined in the second Rukun Negara. This is because Malaysia's sultans hold a largely ceremonial role, including serving as custodians of Islam in the Muslim-majority country, and are deeply respected.

Muhammad Sanusi drew comparisons between the Sultan of Kedah, Al-Aminul Karim Sultan Sallehuddin Sultan Badlishah, and the Sultan of Selangor, Sultan Sharafuddin Idris Shah, in the context of Amirudin's appointment as Menteri Besar in 2018 following Pakatan Harapan's unprecedented win in the 14th General Elections. Sanusi referred to the appointment using the Kedah-Northern dialect, calling it 'Cokia' (substandard or useless), and body-shamed Amirudin, stating he was 'Inci Pun Tak Berapa Nak Cukup' (unfit for duties).

Due to his statements, numerous police reports have been filed, including by representatives on behalf of the Selangor Sultan. The Council of Royal Selangor has initiated legal action, treating Sanusi's comments as a serious criminal matter. Datuk Emran Abdul Kadir, one of its members, stated that Sanusi must immediately apologize for disputing the Sultan's prerogative.

Other notable figures who voiced opposition to Sanusi included Hashim Jasin, the Spiritual Leader of PAS, who reminded Sanusi to watch his words. In contrast, former Minister of Health Khairy Jamaluddin stated that watching his words would not change Sanusi's gung-ho image. UMNO President Ahmad Zahid Hamidi urged Kedahans not to vote for a "joker," referring to Sanusi, in the upcoming state elections. Communications and Digital Minister Fahmi Fadzil condemned Sanusi's alleged insults against the Selangor Sultan, warning him to prepare for the consequences. Similarly, Home Affairs Minister Saifuddin Nasution Ismail told the press that issues related to the 3R (Race, Religion, and Royalty) could have negative consequences, and Sanusi must be held accountable for his actions. He emphasized that the government had more important matters to address than banning Sanusi's TikTok account.

After the outcry, on 14 July 2023, Sanusi held a press conference in which he issued a formal apology letter to the Sultan and stated that his words had been taken out of context. Sanusi also confirmed that he had provided his statement to the police to assist in the investigation following the report filed by PKR Youth and other political parties. He was informed by the Selangor Royal Office that the Sultan had replied to his letter, but he refused to disclose the contents of the reply out of respect for the nobility of the Selangor Royal Institution.

In response, Menteri Besar Amirudin Shari expressed anger over Sanusi's statement, stating that Sanusi should be held accountable for his comments and must act more responsibly, as befits his position. He urged Sanusi to learn from him how to develop Kedah and stop misleading his voters and the public. Amirudin also expressed confusion over Sanusi's apology and reminded Malaysians to focus on facts and data to help develop their respective states and the country.

On 17 July 2023, the Commissioner of PAS in Selangor, Ahmad Yunus Hairi, and the Selangor Police Chief, Dato Hussein Omar Khan, held an audience with Sultan Sharafuddin to discuss the matter. As a result, the Selangor Royal Office issued a Royal Decree stating that "the issue is yet to be resolved."

Despite the clarifications and apology, Sanusi was detained and taken into custody by the Royal Malaysian Police (PDRM) in the early hours of 18 July 2023, following the Perikatan Nasional Supreme Council Meeting held at their headquarters in Solaris Dutamas, Segambut, Kuala Lumpur.

Harian Metro reported that Sanusi was arrested in his hotel room in Mont Kiara by 20 officers from the Classified Criminal Investigations Department (USJT) and Bukit Aman's Anti-Vice, Gambling, and Secret Societies Division (D7). They ordered him to leave his room and took him to a Toyota Fortuner four-wheel drive, heading to the Gombak District Police Headquarters (IPD). He was heavily escorted by vehicles from the PDRM Selangor Contingent of the Crime Investigation Department (JSJ).

According to The Star, Sanusi's political secretary, Hilmi Abd Wahab, stated that Sanusi saw two men in dark clothing standing at the emergency exit. As minutes passed, more uniformed officers appeared, and by 2.30 am, a total of 20 policemen were reportedly standing outside his hotel room. Sanusi was informed that he was being detained under Section 4(1)(a) (Act 15) of the Sediction Act and would need to attend legal proceedings at the Selayang Sessions Court. This was confirmed by the Inspector-General of Police (IGP) Razarudin Husain, who stated that investigation papers regarding the 3Rs had been sent to the Attorney General of Malaysia. Included in the papers were references to PAS President Abdul Hadi Awang and former Finance Minister Lim Guan Eng. Razarudin also mentioned that Sanusi had refused to answer calls, leading to his sudden arrest. The case is considered a seizable offense because the report was lodged by the Selangor Royal Council, involving both the Agong and the Sultan of Selangor. Razarudin clarified that the 3R issue is serious, as it could lead to insults against all Malay Rulers.

Later in the morning, Sanusi was seen at the Selayang Sessions Court at 8:55 am. However, Astro Awani, during a live broadcast, reported that he entered the court through the back entrance to avoid the media.

According to Free Malaysia Today, Sanusi pleaded not guilty to two charges, both framed under Section 4(1)(a) (Act 15) of the Sedition Act 1948, at two separate courts. The judges presiding over the case were Nor Rajiah Mat Zin and Osman Affendi Mohd Shalleh.

The provision carries a punishment of up to RM5,000 in fines, three years in jail, or both for first-time offenders. Sanusi is said to have committed the offense at Simpang Empat, Taman Selayang Mutiara in Gombak, Selangor, on 11 July. The second charge he faces relates to a statement he made that was "inclined to incite disloyalty against the Rulers." He is said to have committed this offense at the same place and time. Sanusi was granted bail of RM5,000 for both charges, and both courts imposed a gag order, preventing him from making any comments regarding the case.

Amid criticism of the use of the controversial Sedition Act against a political opponent, Prime Minister Anwar Ibrahim stressed that the case relates to "the position and dignity" of Malaysia's monarchs. He further added that he would not meddle in the matter, as the charges were laid by the Attorney General following a police investigation that adhered to proper procedures.

Meanwhile, Law and Institutional Reforms Minister Azalina Othman Said announced that the government was considering a new law to address the so-called 3R issues, aiming to replace the controversial Sedition Act of 1948. She also stated that Sanusi's actions would not absolve him of criminal responsibility. The government plans to hold discussions with relevant parties to assess the matter with stakeholders.

Negative remarks about Malaysia's royalty can be prosecuted under the colonial-era Sedition Act 1948, which has been used against individuals who criticize the Sultans on social media. However, sedition charges brought against Malaysian politicians have been rare in recent years. In neighboring Thailand, there is a strict lese-majeste law that bans insults against its monarchy.

== Spreading the Green Wave to Johor and Singapore ==
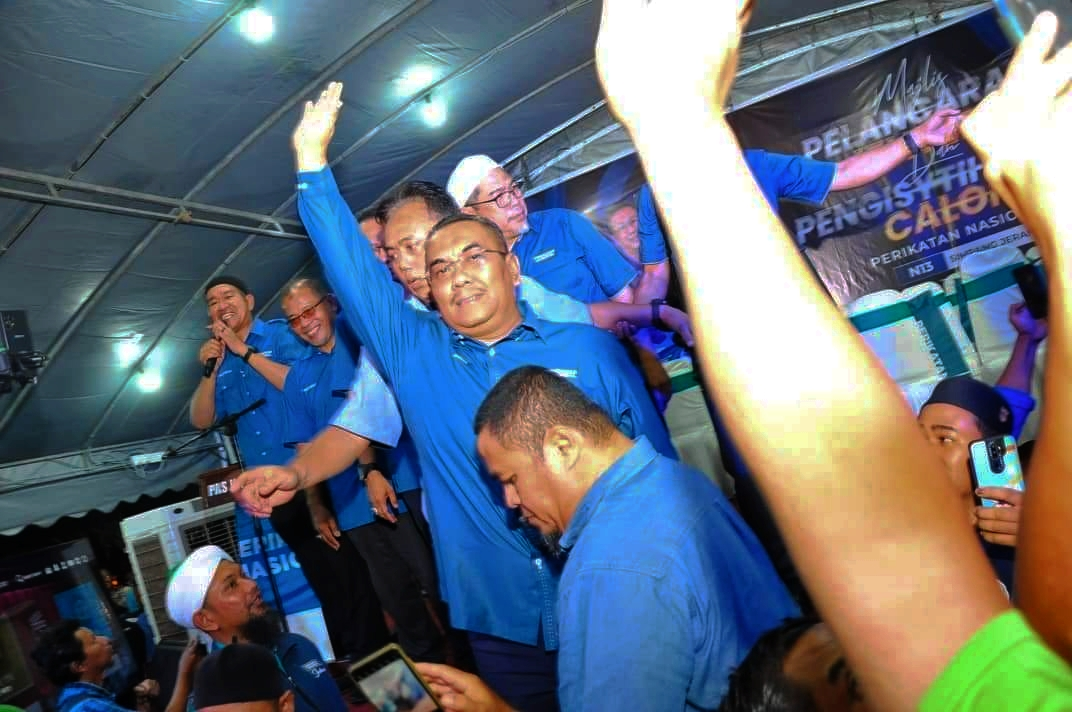
Muhammad Sanusi with his famous hand salute while in Johor

Leading up to the Simpang Jeram by-election, Muhammad Sanusi arrived in Simpang Jeram on 24 August 2023, proclaiming that "the wave that broke out in the recent six state elections will reach Johor and even go all the way to Singapore". He also urged voters to "experiment" with their votes by choosing PAS as the first step toward taking over the Johor government in the next state election. Larkin representative Mohd Hairi Mad Shah then warned Sanusi not to bring his impolite manners (loqlaq) to Johor or subvert sentiments against the state's royalty.

A manipulated video surfaced on social media, showing Sanusi being welcomed by a mob at Simpang Jeram. Police investigations later concluded that the video was fake. Sanusi distanced himself from the video, claiming that he was not aware of it until it was reported by the media.

== See also ==
- Corruption in Malaysia
- Green Wave (Malaysia)
- Malay Agenda
