= Electoral wipeout =

Lopsided defeat in a contested election

An electoral wipeout occurs when a prominent or notably important main party wins no seat(s) in an election cycle; "wiped out" means no one secured victory, from that party, in the body that has conducted an election. The term is also used when a major party is reduced to a very small presence in the legislature.

It is the opposite for a loss at the rate of another party's "landslide victory"; the two descriptions are often used as journalistic reference to critique overall opinion or support for the defeated party given the districts which may be regarded as a usual traditional stronghold have also suffered abandonment in securing assumed victory.

A use of the phrase generally assumes that the returns were the product of a legitimate election; show elections to fraudulent legislatures regularly produce incredibly strong majorities for the ruling party (or parties).

== Australia ==
=== Federal elections ===
Between 1901 and 1949, the federal upper house, the Australian Senate, was elected by a system of majoritarian or "winner-take-all" voting. Each state had three of its six Senators retiring at each half-senate election. Each voter had three votes at each election, whether by first-past-the-post (FPTP) 1901–1918, or the alternative vote. It was often the case that the three seats all went the same way, leading to lopsided results in the six states such as 36–0 or 3–33.

In 1948, the Single Transferable Vote (STV) was introduced. At the same time, the number of senators per state was increased from 6 to 10, with 5 instead of 3 retiring at each triennial election.

Since the introduction of STV in the Senate, the parties have generally been evenly balanced, with minor parties and independents holding the balance of power.

In the 2004 election, the Howard government reached 57% of the senate vote in Queensland after the distribution of preferences under the then-used Group Ticket Voting system. It thereby obtained a majority in its own right in the senate from July 2005, when the new senators took up their seats. The number of quotas required to win a majority (four) of six seats, at 57% (four-sevenths of the votes), is so high because there are an even number of seats.

In the lower house, FPTP was changed to preferential voting in 1918.

=== State and territory elections ===
- At the 1974 Queensland state election, using single-member electorates and full-preferential voting, the Labor opposition was reduced to a "cricket team" of eleven MPs, against the National Country Party/ Liberal Party Coalition government with 69 seats (and 2 independents). Labor recorded an even worse result in the 2012 Queensland state election when it lost office and was reduced to a "water polo squad" of seven seats, with the Liberal National Party of Queensland winning 78, the Katter's Australian Party winning 2 and 2 independents.
- At the 2016 Northern Territory general election, the one-term incumbent Country Liberal Party government, led by Adam Giles (who replaced Terry Mills), was defeated by the Labor opposition, led by Michael Gunner. The CLP lost all but two seats. Although it was outnumbered by independents (and later on by the new Territory Alliance party due to defections), the CLP remained the official opposition and regained several seats at the next election.
- At the 2021 Western Australian state election, the WA Liberal opposition was reduced to only two seats against Labor's 53. This made them one of the only instances of one of the major parties having less seats than a third party (the Nationals won four seats in the election). This election had already been conceded by the Liberal leader Zak Kirkup before election day, but even Kirkup lost his seat, making him the first major party leader in 88 years in Western Australia to do so.

== Barbados ==
- In the 2018 Barbadian general election, the governing Democratic Labour Party was reduced from a majority of 16 seats to 0 seats, with the opposition (Barbados Labour Party) picking up all of the DLP's seats to have a 30–0 majority. Under first past the post, the DLP had received only 33,985 votes, out of 154,193, compared to the BLP's 111,968 votes. The DLP later on then failed to gain a single seat in the 2022 and 2026 general elections, leading to another BLP landslide of 30-0.

== Bulgaria ==
- In the 2001 Bulgarian parliamentary election the governing United Democratic Forces went from 52.56% and 137 out of 240 seats in 1997 to 18.18% and 51 seats.
- In the 2026 Bulgarian parliamentary election the Bulgarian Socialist Party, who have been the governing party multiple times and have had an uninterrupted parliamentary presence since the first election after the fall of communism, received just 3.02% of the vote. This is beneath the 4% minimum threshold for a seat leaving them with no MPs for the first time.

== Canada ==
Canadian politics has seen electoral wipeouts at both provincial and federal level.

- Alberta has seen electoral wipeouts in which political dynasties would never regain power after their defeat: the 1935 election resulted in the incumbent United Farmers of Alberta losing all of its 36 seats to the Alberta Social Credit Party. The Alberta Social Credit Party would lose to the formerly moribund Progressive Conservatives in the 1971 election, dropping from 55 seats to 25 seats. The Progressive Conservatives would fall after 44 years to the Alberta New Democratic Party dropping from 70 seats to 9. The 2015 election would be the final election the Progressive Conservatives contested as a party before merging with the Wildrose Party to form the United Conservatives in its first leadership election in 2017.
- Saskatchewan has witnessed electoral wipeouts on four separate occasions: the 1934 election resulted in the incumbent Conservatives lose all of their seats; the 1944 election saw the governing Liberals reduced to 5 seats from 38; the 1982 election resulted in the incumbent NDP losing 35 of their 44 seats; and in 1991 the Conservatives were ousted with a 28-seat drop to 10 seats.
- The 1935 Prince Edward Island general election resulted in the incumbent Conservatives losing all 18 of their seats to the Liberals, who won every seat in the legislature.
- In the 1984 Canadian federal election, the governing Liberals were reduced from 135 to 40 seats, and although this was sufficient to remain as the Official Opposition, the party's long-term viability was questioned for the next couple years since the third-place NDP had won 30 seats.
- The 1987 New Brunswick general election saw the ruling Progressive Conservatives lose all 39 of their seats, with the Liberal Party winning every seat in the legislature.
- In the 1987 Ontario general election, the Progressive Conservatives lost 36 of its 52 seats and fell to third place. The Progressive Conservatives had been the largest party in the legislature for the past 44 years, serving as the Official Opposition due to the Liberal-NDP accord struck shortly after the 1985 Ontario general election which ended 42 continuous years of Progressive Conservative government.
- In the 1990 Ontario general election, just three years after winning a landslide in 1987, the governing Ontario Liberal Party called a snap election and were reduced from 95 to 36 seats largely at the expense of the NDP, who won a surprising majority, although the Liberals remained the second largest party and formed the Official Opposition.
- In the 1993 Canadian federal election, the governing Progressive Conservative Party, which had been in office for nearly a decade, was reduced from an overall majority of 156 seats to only two and suffered an almost 27% drop in their vote. The Progressive Conservatives never recovered from the loss and, ten years later, merged with the Canadian Alliance into the Conservative Party of Canada.
- In the 1995 Ontario general election, the governing NDP was reduced from 74 seats to 17 seats to settle for third place, as the Progressive Conservatives went from third place to winning a majority government.
- In the 2001 British Columbia general election, the governing NDP was reduced from 37 to two seats, with the other 77 being won by the Liberals.
- In the 2011 Canadian federal election, the Bloc Québécois was reduced from 47 to 4 seats.
- In the 2018 Ontario general election, the governing Ontario Liberal Party lost 48 seats, falling from 58 in 2014 to 7 seats. The Liberals remained third place in the legislature after the 2022 and 2025 general elections.
- In the 2025 Canadian federal election, the New Democratic Party was reduced from 25 to 7 seats.
- In the 2026 Quebec general election, the governing Coalition Avenir Québec lost all 79 seats.

== Fiji ==
- At the 1999 Fijian general election, the incumbent Soqosoqo ni Vakavulewa ni Taukei (SVT) government, led by Sitiveni Rabuka, was defeated by the Labour opposition, led by Mahendra Chaudhry. Labour won 37 seats (an increase of 30), the Fijian Association Party (FAP) won 10, SVT won eight, the Party of National Unity (PANU) won four, the Christian Democratic Alliance (VLV) won three, the Nationalist Vanua Tako Lavo Party (NVTLP) won two the United General Party (UGP) won two and independents won five. The election resulted in Chaudhry became the country's first Indo-Fijian Prime Minister.

== Germany ==
The use of an electoral threshold in German elections means that sometimes a major party can fail to win seats in the Bundestag or a state parliament, either because their vote share falls below 5% or because the number of directly-elected seats drops below 3. Post-war examples include:

- 1957 West German federal election: The League of Expellees and Deprived of Rights (BHE) in 1956 lost its two cabinet members of the Second Adenauer cabinet when they crossed the floor to Adenauer's CDU, and in 1957 lost all 27 seats.
- 2002 German federal election: The Party of Democratic Socialism (PDS) went from 36 seats to just 2 (both directly-elected), but forged an alliance just in time before the 2005 snap election to return as The Left Party/PDS
- 2013 German federal election: The Free Democratic Party (FDP), part of the Second Merkel cabinet, lost all 93 seats.
- 2025 German federal election: The Free Democratic Party, part of the Scholz cabinet, lost all 91 seats, with Christian Lindner resigning as party leader.

== India ==
=== National level ===
2014 Indian general election: Then-ruling Indian National Congress suffered a decline of 9.24% in vote share. The party slumped to an all-time low of 44 seats from the previous tally of 206 (out of total 543 seats of Lok Sabha) and was thus removed from power.

=== State level ===
1965 Kerala Assembly Elections- The Communist Party of India won merely 3 out of 133 seats in the Kerala Legislative Assembly.

1967 Kerala Assembly Elections- The Indian National Congress won merely 9 out of 133 seats in the Kerala Legislative Assembly.

1991 Tamil Nadu Assembly Elections- The Dravida Munnetra Kazhagam led by M. Karunanidhi won merely 2 out of 234 seats in the Tamil Nadu Legislative Assembly.

1996 Tamil Nadu Assembly Elections- The incumbent Anna Dravida Munnetra Kazhagam led by Jayalalithaa won merely 4 out of 234 seats in the Tamil Nadu Legislative Assembly.

2022 Gujarat Assembly Elections- The Indian National Congress won merely 17 out of 182 seats in the Gujarat Legislative Assembly.

2014 Andhra Pradesh Assembly Elections- The incumbent Indian National Congress was wiped out, winning zero out of the 175 seats in the Andhra Pradesh Legislative Assembly.

2024 Andhra Pradesh Assembly Elections- The incumbent YSRCP led by Jagan Mohan Reddy won merely 11 out of 175 seats in the Andhra Pradesh Legislative Assembly.

2024 Maharashtra Assembly Elections- The Indian National Congress won merely 16 out of 288 seats in the Maharashtra Legislative Assembly.

2025-Assembly Elections- The Indian National Congress won merely 6 out of 243 seats in the Bihar Legislative Assembly.

2011 West Bengal Legislative Assembly election and 2021 West Bengal Legislative Assembly election: Communist Party of India (Marxist) had been winning elections continuously since 1977. However in 2011, it faced a catastrophic loss of 136 seats and was reduced to 40 seats in the Vidhan Sabha(total 294 seats). The party was thus ousted from power. In 2021 election, it won 0 seats and was wiped out from the state.

== Malaysia ==
- In the 1990 Kelantan state election, the ruling Barisan Nasional state government went from 29 to 0 seats out of 39 in the assembly and were ousted from power. The Malaysian Islamic Party gained a majority and has governed the state continuously since then.
- In the 1999 Terengganu state election, the ruling Barisan Nasional state government went from 25 to 4 seats out of 32 in the assembly and were ousted from power.
- In the 2004 Terengganu state election, the ruling Malaysian Islamic Party state government went down from 28 to 4 out of 32 and were ousted from power.
- In the 2008 Kedah state election, the ruling Barisan Nasional state government went from 31 to 14 out of 36 in the assembly and were ousted from power.
- In the 2008 Penang state election, the ruling Barisan Nasional state government went from 38 to 11 seats out of 40 in the assembly and were ousted from power. Pakatan Harapan gained a majority and has governed the state continuously since then.
- In the 2008 Selangor state election, the ruling Barisan Nasional state government went from 54 to 20 seats out of 56 in the assembly and were ousted from power. Pakatan Harapan gained a majority and has governed the state continuously since then.
- In the 2018 Malaysian general election, the ruling Barisan Nasional went from 133 to 79 seats out of 222 in the Dewan Rakyat and were ousted from power.
- In the 2022 Malaysian general election, Barisan Nasional was wiped out from parliament seats in Kedah, Kelantan, Terengganu, Perlis due to Green Wave phenomenon. Barisan Nasional also failed to win any seats in Selangor, Melaka and Penang mostly to Perikatan Nasional for the first time due to Green Wave phenomenon.
- In the 2022 Perlis state election, the ruling Barisan Nasional state government went from 10 to 0 seats out of 15 in the assembly and were ousted from power.
- In the 2022 Perak state election, Barisan Nasional was wiped out of most state seats in Northern Perak, losing most of its seats to Perikatan Nasional.
- In the 2018 Kedah state election, Barisan Nasional was wiped out for the 2nd time in Kedah, leaving only 3 seats and losing almost all of its seats to Pan-Malaysian Islamic Party in Malay-majority and rural areas and Pakatan Harapan in mixed areas.
- In the 2023 Malaysian state elections, Barisan Nasional was wiped out in Kedah and Terengganu assembly by Perikatan Nasional while all but 2 seat in Kelantan. Pakatan Harapan also wiped out all but 1 seat in Kelantan and 3 seats at Kedah.
- In the 2025 Sabah state election, Pakatan Harapan was wiped out but 1 seat in assembly with Democratic Action Party losing all his seats mostly to WARISAN party.
- In the 2026 Johor state election, Perikatan Nasional was wiped out from the Johor State Legislative Assembly. Losing all the seats including Maharani that defended by Malaysian Islamic Party since 2008, and Bukit Kepong that has been defended by Sahruddin Jamal, 17th Menteri Besar of Johor that defended since 2018. Losing all the seats to Barisan Nasional

== Netherlands ==
Electoral wipeouts are fairly rare in the Netherlands, due to the electoral system requiring just 0.67% of the vote for a seat. However, there are some contemporary examples:

- In the 2003 Dutch general election, the Pim Fortuyn List was reduced to 8 seats, after winning 26 the year prior. The party fell out of parliament entirely in 2006.
- In the 2017 Dutch general election, the Labour Party fell from 38 seats to 9, and lost over three-quarters of its vote share.
- In the 2025 Dutch general election, New Social Contract lost all 20 seats.

== New Zealand ==
Until it moved to a proportional representation system in 1996, general elections in New Zealand were also prone to the possibility of wipeouts, though these in general involved the likelihood of third parties getting few or no seats rather than one of the two major parties being massively underrepresented. This former circumstance occurred most starkly in the 1981 general election, in which the Social Credit Party gained 20.6% of the vote yet gained only two seats in the 92-seat parliament.

The 1935 general election did, however, see a major party wipeout, and led to the creation of a new major party. In the 1935 election, the Labour Party gained 46.1% of the vote to the United/Reform Coalition's 32.9%, but won 53 seats to the United/Reform's 19. As a result of this election the two coalition parties merged to form the National Party, which remains a major force in New Zealand politics to the present day.

== Philippines ==
In the Philippines, the House of Representatives (and its predecessors) are, for the most part, elected under first-past-the-post (FPTP) system; in 1998, parallel voting was instituted, where 20% of the seats are contested in a party-list system, with the 80% of the seats still being elected via FPTP. The Senate since 1941 has been elected under multiple non-transferable vote. From 1941 to 1951, voters can vote under general ticket, which can lead to wipeouts for any party that wins the election. In 1978, this was also the electoral system for the Interim Batasang Pambansa (parliament).

- 1949 Philippine Senate election: The Liberal Party won all 8 seats disputed in the election. The Nacionalista Party were almost wiped out, only retaining 4 seats.
- 1951 Philippine Senate election: The Nacionalista Party won all 9 (8 seats in the general election and 1 seat in a special election held concurrently) seats disputed.
- 1955 Philippine Senate election: The Nacionalista Party won all 9 (8 seats in the general election and 1 seat in a special election held concurrently) seats disputed. The Liberal Party were wiped out in the Senate.
- 1978 Philippine parliamentary election: The Kilusang Bagong Lipunan won 137 of 166 seats disputed, The primary opposition, Lakas ng Bayan, were wiped out and alleged massive fraud.
- 2019 Philippine Senate election: The Hugpong ng Pagbabago won 9 seats disputed in the election. The other 3 seats were won by other parties. The primary opposition, Otso Diretso, were wiped out.

== Poland ==
The chaotic emergence of a democratic political scene following the fall of communism and the often-changing electoral system caused many wipeouts in Polish electoral history:

- In the 1993 Polish parliamentary election, Centre Agreement, Liberal Democratic Congress, Peasants' Agreement, Solidarity, Polish Beer-Lovers' Party, Real Politics Union and Party X, which held a total of 158 seats, all failed to pass the newly introduced 5% electoral threshold, losing all seats.
- In the 1997 Polish parliamentary election, the Polish People's Party which was part of the ruling coalition won 27 seats, down from 132 in the previous election, while Labour Union failed to pass electoral threshold and lost all 41 seats.
- In the 2001 Polish parliamentary election, the ruling Solidarity Electoral Action-Freedom Union coalition failed to enter parliament, losing all 261 seats. Solidarity Electoral Action dissolved soon after, while Freedom Union was succeeded by Democratic Party – demokraci.pl in 2005.
- In the 2005 Polish parliamentary election, the ruling Democratic Left Alliance won 55 seats, down from 216 in the previous election and lost all 70 seats in the Senate.
- In the 2007 Polish parliamentary election, Self-Defence of the Republic of Poland and League of Polish Families, both part of the ruling coalition, lost all 56 and 34 seats respectively. Both parties never appeared in the Sejm again.
- In the 2015 Polish parliamentary election, the United Left lost all 67 seats due to not passing the 8% threshold for electoral coalitions. The coalition reappeared in the Sejm in the 2019 election as The Left.

== Spain ==
- In the 1982 Spanish general election, ruling Union of the Democratic Centre went down from 168 to 11 seats, out of 350, and were ousted from government.
- In the April 2019 Spanish general election, the People's Party went from holding 127 of the 208 directly elected senate seats to just 54, falling from a comfortable overall majority of 61% of seats to holding just over 27% of the total, despite the fact that the Spanish electoral system for the Senate all but guarantees at least one seat for the runner-up party in 47 of the 50 provinces. Meanwhile, in the Congress of Deputies, the PP lost all their seats in the Basque Country (down from 2) and were reduced to a single one in Catalonia (down from 5).
- In the November 2019 Spanish general election the Citizens party lost 47 of their 57 seats in Congress.

== United Kingdom ==
=== General elections ===
- At the 1997 general election, the Conservative Party were entirely wiped out in Scotland and Wales, losing eleven and six seats respectively. The Conservatives also failed to win any seats in Wales at the 2001 general election. The Conservatives did however, gain a seat in Scotland in 2001, but they did not gain any additional seats there until 2017; while their share of the vote remained below 20%.
- At the 2005 general election, the Ulster Unionist Party, which had been Northern Ireland's largest party, lost 5 of their 6 seats. Their only remaining seat was lost at the 2010 general election, leaving it without representation for the first time since the party was created in 1912.
- At the 2015 United Kingdom general election, the Liberal Democrats lost 49 of their 57 seats, and despite taking 8% of the national vote only had 1.2% of the MPs. In Scotland, Labour went from 41 seats in 2010 to 1 seat in 2015, ending 51 years of Labour dominance of Scottish politics at Westminster.
- At the 2024 general election, the Conservative Party won 121 seats, 44 fewer seats than they won in 1997, making this their worst ever election result since their founding in 1834 and were ousted from government. The Conservative Party was also completely wiped out in Wales. The Scottish National Party lost around half a million votes and saw their seat count reduced to 9 out of the 48 seats won at the 2019 general election.

=== Scottish elections ===
The Scottish Parliament elections use a version of the additional-member system, meaning that 73 seats are won through First Past the Post constituency votes, and additional seats are added for the regional vote which uses a variation of the D'Hondt method.

- In the 2007 Scottish Parliament election, the Scottish Socialist Party lost all of their six seats, with their share of the vote reduced by over 6%.
- In the 2011 Scottish Parliament election, Scottish Labour lost twenty constituency seats (seven overall), with the Scottish Liberal Democrats losing nine (twelve overall). The Lib Dems were left with only two constituency seats, suffering a complete wipeout on the Scottish mainland, leaving only Shetland and Orkney (two of the safest seats in the country) with Lib Dem MSPs.

=== Welsh elections ===
The Senedd used the additional-member system, before switching to closed party list proportional representation (using the D'Hondt method) from 2026.

- In the 2021 Senedd election, UKIP lost all seven of their seats, going from 13% of the regional vote to under 2%.
- In the 2026 Senedd election, Welsh Labour, in power since devolution began in 1999, and dominant over Welsh politics for over a century, won only 9 of 96 seats, down from a notional 44 seats under the new electoral system. Labour's vote collapsed from 36.2% of the party vote in 2021 to 11.1% in 2026, ending a century of Labour's dominance in Wales. The scale of the Labour defeat saw First Minister Eluned Morgan becoming the first leader of a government in the UK to lose their seat while in office.

== Elsewhere ==
- In the 1950 Turkish general election, ruling Republican People's Party went down from 395 to 69 seats, out of 487 and were ousted from government.
- In the 1986 Trinidad and Tobago general election – The ruling People's National Movement led by Prime Minister George Chambers went from 26 to 3 seats, out of 36 seats the House of Representatives with 32% of the popular vote and were ousted from government.
- In the 1990 Grenadian general election – The ruling New National Party led by Prime Minister Keith Mitchell went from 14 to 2 seats, out of 15 seats the House of Representatives with 18% of the popular vote and were ousted from government.
- In the 1991 Trinidad and Tobago general election – The ruling National Alliance for Reconstruction led by Prime Minister A. N. R. Robinson went from 31 to 2 seats, out of 36 seats the House of Representatives with 25% of the popular vote and were ousted from government.
- In the 1998 Belizean general election – The ruling United Democratic Party led by Prime Minister Manuel Esquivel went from 15 to 3 seats, out of 36 seats the House of Representatives with 40% of the popular vote and were ousted from government.
- 1993 French legislative election: Ruling Socialist Party went down from 260 to 53 seats out of 577. Socialists were ousted from government and outgoing Prime Minister Pierre Bérégovoy committed suicide after the loss.
- In the 2000 Mongolian legislative election, the Mongolian People's Revolutionary Party overturned a large majority for the Democratic Union, winning 72 out of the 76 seats contested.
- In the 2002 French legislative election, the centre party Union for French Democracy went down from 112 to 29 seats out of 577, with a further decrease to just 3 seats in 2007.
- In the 2002 Turkish general election, all three members of the ruling coalition (DSP-MHP-ANAP), lost all of their seats in the parliament due to their failure to meet %10 electoral threshold. DSP went from 136 to 0 seats, MHP went from 129 to 0 seats and ANAP went from 86 to 0. Main opposition party, DYP also went from 85 to 0 seats.
- In the 2004 Uruguayan general election, the Colorado Party that had governed the country for most of its history went from obtaining 32.78% of the vote to 10.61%, its worst result in history. The main factor that caused the electoral meltdown was the banking crisis that affected the country two years earlier.
- In the 2006 Israeli legislative election - The ruling Likud party went from 38 to 12 seats out of 120 and were ousted from the government for the 2nd time.
- In the 2008 Belizean general election – The ruling People's United Party led by Prime Minister Said Musa went from 22 to 6 seats, out of 31 seats the House of Representatives with 40% of the popular vote and were ousted from government.
- In the 2009 Japanese general election – The ruling Liberal Democratic Party (Japan) went down from 296 to 119 seats out of 480 in the House of Representatives and were ousted from the government.
- In the 2011 Irish general election, the ruling Fianna Fáil party suffered the worst defeat in its history, returning only 20 TDs to the Dáil. The party moved from being the largest party in the Republic of Ireland, to third for the first time ever. Since the formation of the first Fianna Fáil government in 1932, until the 2011 election, Fianna Fáil had been in power for 61 of those 79 years and had always been the largest party in the state (regardless of whether it was in power or not). Many factors caused the electoral meltdown, but chief among them was the collapse of the Irish economy. In addition, its coalition partner, the Green Party lost all of its seats.
- In the 2012 Japanese general election, the ruling Democratic Party of Japan went down from 308 to 57 seats out of 480 with 15% of the popular vote and were ousted from government.
- In the 2013 Israeli legislative election, the centre party Kadima went down from 28 to 2 seats out of 120, barely passing the electoral threshold by just a few hundred votes and then it chose to not contest the 2015 elections.
- In the 2017 Bahamian general election – The ruling Progressive Liberal Party led by Prime Minister Perry Christie went from 29 to 4 seats, out of 39 seats the House of Representatives with 39% of the popular vote and were ousted from government.
- In the 2017 French legislative election, the ruling Socialist Party went down from 280 to 30 seats out of 577. Socialists were ousted from government.
- In the 2018 Barbadian general election – The ruling Democratic Labour Party led by Prime Minister Freundel Stuart went from 16 to 0 seats, out of 30 seats the House of Assembly with 28% of the popular vote and were ousted from government.
- In the 2020 Belizean general election – The ruling United Democratic Party led by Deputy Prime Minister Patrick Faber went from 19 to 5 seats, out of 31 seats the House of Representatives with 39% of the popular vote and were ousted from government.
- In the 2021 Salvadoran legislative election – The two-party system of the Nationalist Republican Alliance and the Farabundo Martí National Liberation Front went from 61 combined seats to 18 combined seats, out of 84 in the Legislative Assembly and lost control of the legislature.
- In the 2021 Moroccan general election - The ruling Justice and Development Party went from 125 to 13 seats out of 395 in the House of Representatives and were ousted from power.
- In the 2024 Maldivian parliamentary election - the People's National Congress won a landslide against the Maldivian Democratic Party which lost 56 seats and won just 9.
- In the 2025 Bolivian general election, the ruling Movimiento al Socialismo suffered near complete annihilation, retaining only 2 out of its 75 seats in the Chamber of Deputies and losing all seats in the Chamber of Senators.
- In the 2025 Vincentian general election – The ruling Unity Labour Party went from 9 to 1 seat out of 15 in the House of Assembly of Saint Vincent and the Grenadines and were ousted from power.
- In the 2026 Japanese general election – The opposition Centrist Reform Alliance went from 172 to 49 seats out of 465 in the House of Representatives.
