= Tan Wei Shu =

Malaysian politician

Tan Wei Shu AMK
- 陈𬀩树

Member of the Kedah State Executive Council
- In office 2008–2010
- Monarch: Abdul Halim
- Menteri Besar: Azizan Abdul Razak

Member of the Kedah State Legislative Assembly for Bakar Arang
- In office 8 March 2008 – 5 May 2013
- Preceded by: Seng Kooh Huat (BN–MCA)
- Succeeded by: Simon Ooi Tze Min (PR–PKR)

Personal details
- Born: Tan Wei Shu; 8 February 1956 (age 70) Sungai Petani, Kedah, Federation of Malaya (now Malaysia)
- Citizenship: Malaysian
- Party: People's Justice Party (PKR) (–2010); Independent (2010–present)
- Other political affiliations: Pakatan Rakyat (PR) (2008–2010)
- Spouse: Boo Yu Ai
- Children: Jynn Tan Paik Ching; Tan Chun Weoi
- Occupation: Politician

Chinese name
- Traditional Chinese: 陳暐樹
- Simplified Chinese: 陈𬀩树
- Hanyu Pinyin: Chén Wěishù
- Hokkien POJ: Tân Úi-sū
- Tâi-lô: Tân Uí-sū

Tan Wei Shu (陈𬀩树; born 8 February 1956) is a Malaysian politician. He was the Member of the State Assembly of Kedah for the seat of Bakar Arang from 2008 to 2013.

Tan was elected to the State Assembly in the 2008 election as a member of the People's Justice Party (PKR). He was subsequently appointed to the Executive Council of the incoming government as its only Chinese member. However, he was dropped from the Executive Council in March 2010 by Chief Minister Azizan Abdul Razak. He subsequently resigned from PKR alleging that he had been undermined by party leaders. He did not recontest his seat in the 2013 election.

Before entering politics, he practised traditional Chinese medicine.

== Election results ==
Kedah State Legislative Assembly
Year	Constituency	Candidate	Votes	Pct	Opponent(s)	Votes	Pct	Ballot cast	Majority	Turnout
2008	N28 Bakar Arang	Tan Wei Shu (PKR)	10,489	52.62%	Seng Kooh Huat (MCA)	9,159	45.94%	20,496	1,330	74.33%
2008	N28 Bakar Arang	Tan Wei Shu (PKR)	10,489	52.62%	Lim Pok Long (IND)	287	1.44%	20,496	1,330	74.33%

== Honours ==
- Kedah
  - Member of the Order of the Crown of Kedah (AMK) (2009)
