= Bakar Arang =

Political subdivision in Malaysia

Bakar Arang (N28)
Kedah constituency

State constituency
- Legislature: Kedah State Legislative Assembly
MLA
Adam Loh Wei Chai
PH
- Constituency created: 1994
- First contested: 1995
- Last contested: 2023

Demographics
- Population (2020): 91,449
- Electors (2023): 57,867

Bakar Arang (Chinese: 峇甲亚兰) is a state constituency in Kedah, Malaysia, that is represented in the Kedah State Legislative Assembly.

== Demographics ==
As of 2020, Bakar Arang has a population of 91,449 people.

Ethnic breakdown of Bakar Arang's electorate as of 2023
1. Malay (47.6%)
2. Chinese (37.0%)
3. Indian (14.7%)
4. Other ethnicities (0.78%)

== History ==
=== Polling districts ===
According to the gazette issued on 30 March 2018, the Bakar Arang constituency has a total of 18 polling districts.

State constituency	Polling districts	Code	Location
Bakar Arang (N28）	Taman Dahlia	015/28/01	Pusat Bimbingan Islam Sultan Abdul Halim Mu'adzam Shah (PUSBA)
Bakar Arang (N28）	Jalan Pengkalan	015/28/02	SMK Khir Johari
Bakar Arang (N28）	Kolam Air	015/28/03	SK St. Theresa
Bakar Arang (N28）	Bandar	015/28/04	SK Khir Johari
Bakar Arang (N28）	Simpang Tiga Pekan Lama	015/28/05	Dewan Annasamy Pillai, Pekan Lama
Bakar Arang (N28）	Peteri	015/28/06	SK Khir Johari
Bakar Arang (N28）	Kampung Bahru	015/28/07	SK Petani Jaya
Bakar Arang (N28）	Taman Sentosa	015/28/08	SJK (C) Sin Kwang
Bakar Arang (N28）	Taman Delima	015/28/09	SMK Tunku Ismail
Bakar Arang (N28）	Taman Intan	015/28/10	SK Tunku Ismail
Bakar Arang (N28）	Bakar Arang	015/28/11	SMK Bakar Arang
Bakar Arang (N28）	Taman Arked	015/28/12	SK Bakar Arang
Bakar Arang (N28）	Taman Makmur	015/28/13	SMK Che Tom
Bakar Arang (N28）	Sungai Pasir	015/28/14	SK Sungai Pasir
Bakar Arang (N28）	Taman Nilam	015/28/15	SK Taman Intan
Bakar Arang (N28）	Taman Sejati Indah	015/28/16	SK Seri Gedong
Bakar Arang (N28）	Taman Sri Wang	016/28/17	SK Taman Sri Wang
Bakar Arang (N28）	Taman Keladi	015/28/18	SMJK Sin Min (P)

=== Representation history ===
Kedah State Legislative Assemblyman for Bakar Arang
Assembly	No	Years	Member	Party
Constituency created from Tanjong Dawai and Pantai Merdeka
9th	N28	1995–1999	Tan Hong Eng (陈宏英)	BN (MCA)
10th	N28	1999–2004	Tan Hong Eng (陈宏英)	BN (MCA)
11th	N28	2004–2008	Seng Kooh Huat (孙国华)	BN (MCA)
12th	N28	2008–2009	Tan Wei Shu (陈𬀩树)	PR (PKR)
12th	N28	2009–2013	Tan Wei Shu (陈𬀩树)	Independent
13th	N28	2013–2018	Simon Ooi Tze Min (黄思敏)	PR (PKR)
14th	N28	2018–2023	Simon Ooi Tze Min (黄思敏)	PH (PKR)
15th	N28	2023–present	Adam Loh Wei Chai (罗炜家)	PH (PKR)

== Election results ==
Kedah state election, 2023: Bakar Arang
Party	Candidate	Votes	%	∆%
PH	Adam Loh Wei Chai	21,889	54.41	▲54.41
PN	Tai Kuang Tee	18,206	45.25	▲45.25
Parti Rakyat Malaysia	Tan Kee Chye	138	0.34	▲0.16
Total valid votes		40,233	100.00	
Total rejected ballots		217		
Unreturned ballots		54		
Turnout		40,504	69.99	▼12.26
Registered electors		57,867		
Majority		3,683	9.16	▼25.03
PH hold		Swing		

Kedah state election, 2018: Bakar Arang
Party	Candidate	Votes	%	∆%
PKR	Simon Ooi Tze Min	18,440	58.20	▼2.64
PAS	Othman Che Mee	7,607	24.01	▲24.01
BN	Ko Hung Weng	5,547	17.51	▼20.95
Parti Rakyat Malaysia	Tan Kee Chye	58	0.18	▲0.18
Independent	Tan Hock Huat	29	0.10	▲0.10
Total valid votes		31,681	100.00	
Total rejected ballots		391		
Unreturned ballots		0		
Turnout		32,072	82.25	▼3.05
Registered electors		38,991		
Majority		10,833	34.19	▲11.81
PKR hold		Swing		

Kedah state election, 2013: Bakar Arang
Party	Candidate	Votes	%	∆%
PKR	Simon Ooi Tze Min	17,757	60.84	▲8.22
BN	Lee Yean Wang	11,223	38.46	▼7.48
Independent	Ong Kah Soon	204	0.70	▲0.70
Total valid votes		29,184	100.00	
Total rejected ballots		366		
Unreturned ballots		69		
Turnout		29,619	85.30	▲10.97
Registered electors		34,743		
Majority		6,534	22.38	▲15.70
PKR hold		Swing		

Kedah state election, 2008: Bakar Arang
Party	Candidate	Votes	%	∆%
PKR	Tan Wei Shu	10,489	52.62	▲25.43
BN	Seng Kooh Huat	9,159	45.94	▼26.87
Independent	Lim Pok Long	287	1.44	▲1.44
Total valid votes		19,935	100.00	
Total rejected ballots		490		
Unreturned ballots		71		
Turnout		20,496	74.33	▼0.80
Registered electors		27,574		
Majority		1,330	6.68	▼38.94
PKR gain from BN		Swing		?

Kedah state election, 2004: Bakar Arang
Party	Candidate	Votes	%	∆%
BN	Seng Kooh Huat	14,204	72.81	▲8.64
PKR	Johari Abdul	5,304	27.19	▲27.19
Total valid votes		19,509	100.00	
Total rejected ballots		269		
Unreturned ballots		0		
Turnout		19,778	75.13	▼2.58
Registered electors		26,326		
Majority		8,899	45.62	▲17.28
BN hold		Swing		

Kedah state election, 1999: Bakar Arang
Party	Candidate	Votes	%	∆%
BN	Tan Hong Eng	11,066	64.17	▲3.40
PAS	Abdul Halim Mohd Nasir	6,179	35.83	▲16.75
Total valid votes		17,245	100.00	
Total rejected ballots		246		
Unreturned ballots		2,477		
Turnout		19,968	77.71	▲1.62
Registered electors		25,694		
Majority		4,887	28.34	▼12.28
BN hold		Swing		

Kedah state election, 1995: Bakar Arang
Party	Candidate	Votes	%
BN	Tan Hong Eng	9,882	60.77
DAP	Lee Chuan Saw	3,276	20.15
PAS	Haji Azizan Haji Maghribi	3,104	19.08
Total valid votes		16,262	100.00
Total rejected ballots		496	
Unreturned ballots		663	
Turnout		17,421	76.09
Registered electors		22,896	
Majority		6,606	40.62
This was a new constituency created.
