= Simon Ooi Tze Min =

Malaysian politician (born 1984)

- 黄思敏

Political Secretary to the Minister of Science, Technology and Innovation
- Incumbent
- Assumed office 7 January 2023
- Prime Minister: Anwar Ibrahim
- Minister: Chang Lih Kang
- Preceded by: Norshida Ibrahim

Member of the Kedah State Executive Council
- In office 1 August 2018 – 17 May 2020
- Monarch: Sallehuddin
- Menteri Besar: Mukhriz Mahathir
- Portfolio: Chinese, Siamese Community Affairs, Science and Technology, Climate Change and Environment
- Preceded by: Himself (Chinese, Siamese Community Affairs & Environment); Zamri Yusuf (Science and Technology, Climate Change)
- Succeeded by: Robert Ling Kui Ee (Chinese, Siamese Community Affairs, Climate Change and Environment); Ku Abdul Rahman Ku Ismail (Science and Technology)
- Constituency: Bakar Arang
- In office 22 May 2018 – 1 August 2018
- Monarch: Sallehuddin
- Menteri Besar: Mukhriz Mahathir
- Portfolio: Chinese, Siamese Community Affairs, Human Resources and Environment
- Preceded by: Leong Yong Kong
- Succeeded by: Himself (Chinese, Siamese Community Affairs & Environment); Salmee Said (Human Resources)
- Constituency: Bakar Arang

Member of the Kedah State Legislative Assembly for Bakar Arang
- In office 5 May 2013 – 12 August 2023
- Preceded by: Tan Wei Shu (PR–PKR)
- Succeeded by: Adam Loh Wei Chai (PH–PKR)
- Majority: 6,534 (2013); 10,833 (2018)

Faction represented in the Kedah State Legislative Assembly
- 2013–2018: People's Justice Party
- 2018–2023: Pakatan Harapan

Personal details
- Born: 2 July 1984 (age 42) Kedah, Malaysia
- Citizenship: Malaysia
- Party: People's Justice Party (PKR)
- Other political affiliations: Pakatan Rakyat (PR) (2008–2015); Pakatan Harapan (PH) (since 2015)
- Education: University of Putra Malaysia; University of Malaya
- Occupation: Politician

Simon Ooi Tze Min (simplified Chinese: 黄思敏; traditional Chinese: 黃思敏; Jyutping: Wong4 Si1 Man5; Pe̍h-ōe-jī: Ûiⁿ Su-bín; born 2 July 1984), better known as Simon Ooi, is a Malaysian politician who has served as the Political Secretary to the Minister of Science, Technology and Innovation Chang Lih Kang since January 2023. He served as Member of the Kedah State Executive Council (EXCO) in the Pakatan Harapan (PH) state administration under former Menteri Besar Mukhriz Mahathir from May 2018 to the collapse of the PH state administration in May 2020 as well as Member of the Kedah State Legislative Assembly (MLA) for Bakar Arang from May 2013 to August 2023. He is a member of the People's Justice Party (PKR), a component party of the PH coalition. He is also a member of the Central Leadership Council (MPP), State Vice Chairman of Kedah and Division Chief of Sungai Petani of PKR.

== Educational Background ==
Simon received his primary education in SJKC Chung Hwa Sungai Lalang. He then continued his secondary education in SMK Amanjaya. Subsequently after completing secondary school, he furthered his academic education in University of Putra Malaysia (UPM) and obtained his first Bachelor Degree of Computer and Communication System Engineering in 2008. In 2014, he started to pursue his second Bachelor Degree of Jurisprudence in University of Malaya (UM). In the next few years, he had been travelling back and forth between Sungai Petani and Kuala Lumpur weekly to attend lectures in the university. Once, he was forced to defer his study after being appointed as a Member of Kedah State Executive Council in 2018. After the PH government was overthrown, he resumed his study in 2020 and eventually completed the degree in July 2021.

=== Student Activist ===
Simon had been actively involved in student activism during his university time. In 2006, he served as the Vice President of Chinese Language Society of UPM and Coordinator of Student Progressive Front UPM. He then became the Administrative Secretary of Malaysia Youth and Student Democratic Movement (DEMA) in 2007. His most significant chapter as a student activist was initiating a protest and boycott movement against unfair campus election in 2005 through a series of peaceful assemblies in UPM. As a consequence, he was charged by the university authorities for 7 charges under the University and University College Act 1971 (AUKU).

=== Earlier Involvement in Politics ===
Simon kickstarted his journey in politics by joining People’s Justice Party (PKR) in 2008. He debuted as Political Secretary to Gopeng Member of Parliament, Dr Lee Boon Chye from 2008 to 2009. In 2010, he returned to his hometown, Sungai Petani, Kedah and served as a Municipal Councillor in Sungai Petani Municipal Council until 2013 before he was elected as State Assemblyperson in the 13th General Election.

=== Kedah State Assemblyperson ===
In the 13th General Election held on 5 May 2013, it was the first time Simon contested in an election and was elected as the State Assemblyperson of Bakar Arang Constituency in Kedah. The seat was retained by him with a larger majority in the 14th General Election held on 9 May 2018. At the same time, Pakatan Harapan coalition was installed as State Government in Kedah after winning with a majority of 18 out of 36 state seats.

=== Member of Kedah State Executive Council ===
After the Pakatan Harapan coalition became State Government in the 14th General Election, Simon was appointed as a Member of Kedah State Executive Council (EXCO), being the only Chinese representative from PKR. During his service, he held the portfolios of Environment, Science and Technology; as well as Chinese and Siamese Community Affairs. Two years later, the PH State Government in Kedah was overthrown where Simon signed off his duty as an EXCO and returned to the opposition seat.

=== People’s Justice Party ===
Prior to 2018, Simon held the position of Deputy Chairperson for PKR Youth Wing (Angkatan Muda Keadilan) in Kedah state. After the Party Elections in 2018, Simon was appointed as the treasurer of the Central Youth Wing and Vice Chairperson of the party in Kedah. In 2022, he contested in the Keadilan Party Elections or known as Pemilihan Keadilan 2022, he wrestled against one of the pioneer members in the party, Johari Abdul and won the position of Chairman of Sungai Petani Division. Whereas in the central level, Simon contested for the position of Central Leadership Council Member along with 73 other candidates and was elected after securing 703 votes, making him to the Top 20 for the position. He was also continually appointed as the Vice Chairperson of PKR of Kedah.

== Election results ==
Kedah State Legislative Assembly
| Year | Constituency | Candidate | Votes | Pct | Opponent(s) | Votes | Pct | Ballots cast | Majority | Turnout |
|---|---|---|---|---|---|---|---|---|---|---|
| 2013 | N28 Bakar Arang | Simon Ooi Tze Min (PKR) | 17,757 | 60.84% | Lee Yean Wang (MCA) | 11,223 | 38.46% | 29,550 | 6,534 | 85.30% |
| 2013 | N28 Bakar Arang | Simon Ooi Tze Min (PKR) | 17,757 | 60.84% | Ong Kah Soon (IND) | 204 | 0.70% | 29,550 | 6,534 | 85.30% |
| 2018 | N28 Bakar Arang | Simon Ooi Tze Min (PKR) | 18,440 | 58.21% | Othman Che Mee (PAS) | 7,607 | 24.01% | 32,072 | 10,833 | 82.25% |
| 2018 | N28 Bakar Arang | Simon Ooi Tze Min (PKR) | 18,440 | 58.21% | Ko Hung Weng (MCA) | 5,547 | 17.51% | 32,072 | 10,833 | 82.25% |
| 2018 | N28 Bakar Arang | Simon Ooi Tze Min (PKR) | 18,440 | 58.21% | Tan Kee Chye (PRM) | 58 | 0.18% | 32,072 | 10,833 | 82.25% |
| 2018 | N28 Bakar Arang | Simon Ooi Tze Min (PKR) | 18,440 | 58.21% | Tan Hock Kuat (IND) | 29 | 0.09% | 32,072 | 10,833 | 82.25% |

Parliament of Malaysia
| Year | Constituency | Candidate | Votes | Pct | Opponent(s) | Votes | Pct | Ballots cast | Majority | Turnout |
|---|---|---|---|---|---|---|---|---|---|---|
| 2022 | P009 Alor Setar | Simon Ooi Tze Min (PKR) | 27,555 | 35.79% | Afnan Hamimi Taib Azamudden (PAS) | 37,486 | 48.69% | 77,976 | 9,931 | 73.60% |
| 2022 | P009 Alor Setar | Simon Ooi Tze Min (PKR) | 27,555 | 35.79% | Tan Chee Heong (MCA) | 8,930 | 11.60% | 77,976 | 9,931 | 73.60% |
| 2022 | P009 Alor Setar | Simon Ooi Tze Min (PKR) | 27,555 | 35.79% | Mohamad Nuhairi Rahmat (PEJUANG) | 2,383 | 3.10% | 77,976 | 9,931 | 73.60% |
| 2022 | P009 Alor Setar | Simon Ooi Tze Min (PKR) | 27,555 | 35.79% | Fadzil Hanafi (WARISAN) | 366 | 0.48% | 77,976 | 9,931 | 73.60% |
| 2022 | P009 Alor Setar | Simon Ooi Tze Min (PKR) | 27,555 | 35.79% | Sofan Feroza Md Yusup (IND) | 151 | 0.20% | 77,976 | 9,931 | 73.60% |
| 2022 | P009 Alor Setar | Simon Ooi Tze Min (PKR) | 27,555 | 35.79% | Nordin Yunus (IND) | 115 | 0.15% | 77,976 | 9,931 | 73.60% |
