= National Land Code (Malaysia) =

1965 statute regulating land and tenure

Parliament of Malaysia
- Long title: An Act to amend and consolidate the laws relating to land and land tenure, the registration of title to land and of dealings therewith and the collection of revenue therefrom within the States of Johore, Kedah, Kelantan, Malacca, Negeri Sembilan, Pahang, Penang, Perak, Perlis, Selangor, Terengganu and the Federal Territory of Kuala Lumpur, and for purposes connected therewith.
- Citation: Act 56 of 1965
- Territorial extent: Throughout Peninsular Malaysia
- Passed by: Dewan Rakyat
- Passed: 10 August 1965
- Passed by: Dewan Negara
- Passed: 16 August 1965
- Royal assent: 18 September 1965
- Effective: 1 January 1966

Legislative history

Initiating chamber: Dewan Rakyat
- Bill title: National Land Code Bill 1965
- Introduced by: Abdul Rahman Ya'kub, Minister of Lands and Mines
- First reading: 26 May 1965
- Second reading: 9 August 1965
- Third reading: 10 August 1965

Revising chamber: Dewan Negara
- Bill title: National Land Code Bill 1965
- Member(s) in charge: Abdul Rahman Ya'kub, Minister of Lands and Mines
- First reading: 16 August 1965
- Second reading: 16 August 1965
- Third reading: 16 August 1965

Amended by
- National Land Code (Malacca) Order 1967 [P.U. 91/1967] National Land Code (Amendment of First and Tenth Schedules) Order 1968 [P.U. 184/1968] National Land Code (Penang and Malacca) Order 1968 [P.U. 500/1968] National Land Code (Penang and Malacca) Order 1968 [Act A26/1969] Essential (National Land Code) Regulations 1969 [P.U. (A) 414/1969] Essential (National Land Code) Regulations 1969 [P.U. (A) 532/1969] Emergency (Essential Powers) Ordinance No. 88, 1971 [P.U. (A) 73/1971] National Land Code (Amendment) Act 1972 [Act A124/1972] National Land Code (Amendment of Fifth Schedule) Order 1973 [P.U. (A) 231/1973] National Land Code (Amendment) Act 1974 [Act A264/1974] National Land Code (Amendment of First Schedule) Order 1975 [P.U. (A) 267/1975] National Land Code (Amendment) Act 1975 [Act A322/1975] National Land Code (Amendment Fifth (Schedule), Order 1976 [P.U. (A) 222/1976] National Land Code (Amendment) Act 1977 [Act A386/1977] National Land Code (Amendment of Fifth Schedule) Order 1978 [P.U. (A) 126/1978] National Land Code (Amendment) Act 1979 [Act A444/1979] National Land Code (Amendment) Act 1981 [Act A518/1981] National Land Code (Amendment of Fifth Schedule) Order 1982 [P.U. (A) 59/1982] National Land Code (Amendment) Act 1982 [P.U. (A) 542/1982] National Land Code (Amendment) Act 1984 [Act A587/1984] Strata Title Act 1985 [Act 318/1985] National Land Code (Amendment) Act 1985 [Act A615/1985] National Land Code (Amendment) (No.2) Act 1985 [Act A624/1985] National Land Code (Amendment) Act 1986 [Act A658/1986] National Land Code (Amendment) Act 1990 [Act A752/1990] National Land Code (Amendment) Act 1992 [Act A832/1992] National Land Code (Amendment) Act 1996 [Act A941/1996] National Land Code (Modification) Order 1997 [P.U. (A) 203/1997] National Land Code (Amendment of Fifth Schedule) Order 1997 [P.U. (A) 318/1997] National Land Code (Amendment) Act 1998 [Act A1034] National Land Code (Amendment of the Fifteenth Schedule) Order 2000 [P.U. (A) 437/2000] Federal Territory of Putrajaya (Modification of National Land Code) Order 2001 [P.U.(A) 213/2001] National Land Code (Amendment) Act 2001 [Act A1104] Corrigendum Federal Territory of Putrajaya (Modification of National Land Code) Order 2001 [P.U.(A) 164/2002] Federal Territory of Putrajaya (Modification of National Land Code) Order 2002 [P.U. (A) 180/2002] Corrigendum Federal Territory of Putrajaya (Modification of National Land Code) (Amendment) Order 2002 [P.U. (A) 278/2003] Federal Territory (Modification of National Land Code) Order 2004 [P.U.(A) 220/2004]

Related legislation
- Federated Malay States Land Code [Cap. 138] Country Lands (Cultivation) Suspension of Operation Enactment [Cap. 141] Agreements for Leases (Temporary Provisions) Enactment [Cap. 217] Syed Hassan's Concession Resumption Enactment [Cap. 218] Malayan Union Leases and Tenancies (War Absentees) Adjustment Ordinance, 1946 [18 of 1946] Leases and Tenancies (Dispossessed Persons) Ordinance, 1946 [22 of 1946] Pahang Registers of Title Replacement Ordinance, 1946 [36 of 1946] Mukim Registers Replacement Ordinance, 1947 [3 of 1947] Land Revenue (Payment by Instalments) Ordinance, 1947 [16 of 1947] Federation of Malaya Titles to Land (Occupation Period) Ordinance, 1949 [39 of 1949] Dealings in Land (Occupation Period) Ordinance, 1949 [40 of 1949] Dealings in Land (Malacca Customary Lands) (Occupation Period) Ordinance, 1949 [41 of 1949] Customary Tenure of Land (Settlement of Malacca) Ordinance, 1952 [10 of 1952] Customary Tenure (State of Negeri Sembilan) Ordinance, 1952 [33 of 1952] Land Office Procedure (Lost or Destroyed Instruments) Ordinance, 1952 [52 of 1952] Land Laws (Enabling) Ordinance, 1952 [78 of 1952] Straits Settlements Land Officers Powers Ordinance [Cap. 111] Lands Ordinance [Cap. 113] State Lands Encroachments Ordinance [Cap. 114] Conveyancing and Law of Property Ordinance (in so far as it is not repealed by the National Land Code (Penang and Malacca Titles) Act, 1963) [Cap. 118] Voluntary Conveyances Ordinance [Cap. 119] Foreshores Ordinance [Cap. 122] Land Improvement Ordinance [Cap. 123] Aliens Property Ordinance [Cap. 129] Landmarks Ordinance [Cap. 131] The Apportionment Ordinance (in so far as it may apply to rent due to the State Authority) [Cap. 168] Land Revenue Collection Ordinance, 1940 [47 of 1940] State of Johore Land Enactment [No. 1] Rectification of Boundaries Enactment [No. 15] Settlement Enactment. 18 of 1936 [No. 52] Abolition of Old Titles Enactment, 1936; Land (Temporary Provisions) Enactment, 1938 [15 of 1938] State of Kedah Boundaries and Survey Maps Enactment [No. 12] Land Enactment [No. 56] State of Kelantan Land Enactment, 1938 (except provision saved by the Twelfth Schedule) [26 of 1938] Adviser Lands and Mines (Change of Title) Enactment, 1960 [11 of 1960] State of Negeri Sembilan Land Registration (Government Interests) Enactment, 1939 [5 of 1939] State of Pahang Land Registration (Government Interests) Enactment, 1940 [1 of 1940] State of Perak Land Registration (Government Interests) Enactment, 1940 [1 of 1940] State of Perlis Land Enactment, 1356 [11 of 1356] State of Selangor Land Registration (Government Interests) Enactment, 1939 [5 of 1939] State of Trengganu Land Enactment, 1357 [3 of 1357] British Military Administration Agricultural Foodcrop Proclamation [67 of 1946]
- Status: In force

The National Land Code (Malay: Kanun Tanah Negara), is a Malaysian law enacted to amend and consolidate existing laws relating to land and land tenure, registrations of title to land and of dealings therewith, and the collection of revenue therefrom within Peninsular Malaysia.

== Preamble ==
1. WHEREAS it is desired to introduce in the form of a National Land Code a uniform land system within the States of Johore, Kedah, Kelantan, Malacca, Negeri Sembilan, Pahang, Penang, Perak, Perlis, Selangor, Terengganu and the Federal Territory of Kuala Lumpur:
2. AND WHEREAS provision has been made by the National Land Code (Penang and Malacca Titles) Act 1963, for the introduction of a system of registration of title to land in the States of Penang and Malacca, for the issue of replacement titles, for the assimilation of such system to the provisions of the National Land Code, and for matters incidental thereto:
3. AND WHEREAS it is now expedient for the purpose only of ensuring uniformity of law and policy to make a law with respect to land tenure, registration of titles relating to land, transfer of land, leases and charges in respect of land, and easements and other rights and interests in land:

== Structure ==
The National Land Code, in its current form (1 January 2006), consists of 6 Divisions and 35 Parts containing 447 sections and 16 schedules (including 37 amendments).

- Division I: Introductory
  - Part 1: Preliminary
  - Part 1A: Computerized Land Registration System
  - Part 1B: Modifications to Facilitate the Implementation of the Pengurusan Danaharta Nasional Berhad Act 1998
  - Part 1C: Modifications to Facilitate the Implementation of the Electronic Land Administration System
  - Part 2: Administration
    - Chapter 1: Powers of the Federation and of Federal Officers
    - Chapter 2: Powers of the States and of State Officers
    - Chapter 3: General Provisions Relating to Officers, etc.
    - Chapter 4: Provisions Relating to Enquiries
  - Part 3: Rights and Powers of the State Authority
    - Chapter 1: Property in Land and Powers of Disposal
    - Chapter 2: Classification and Use of Land
    - Chapter 3: Rights of Access to, and Use of, Alienated Lands
- Division II: Disposal of Land
  - Part 4: Disposal Otherwise than by Alienation
    - Chapter 1: Reservation of Land
    - Chapter 2: Temporary Occupation of Land
    - Chapter 3: Removal of Rock Material
    - Chapter 4: Permit to Use Air Space Above State Land and Reserved Land
  - Part 5: Disposal by Alienation
    - Chapter 1: Introductory
    - Chapter 2: Approval of Land for Alienation
    - Chapter 3: Alienation under Final Title
  - Part 5A: Disposal of Underground Land
- Division III: Alienated Lands; Incidents and Registration of Title
  - Part 6: Rent
    - Chapter 1: General
    - Chapter 2: Collection of Arrears of Rent
    - Chapter 3: Revision of Rent
  - Part 7: Conditions and Restrictions in Interest
    - Chapter 1: General
    - Chapter 2: Summary of Conditions and Restrictions in Interest Affecting Alienated Lands
    - Chapter 3: Implied Conditions
    - Chapter 4: Express Conditions and Restrictions in Interest
    - Chapter 5: Enforcement of Conditions
  - Part 8: Forfeiture
  - Part 9: Sub-division, Partition and Amalgamation
    - Chapter 1: Sub-division of Lands
    - Chapter 2: Partition of Lands
    - Chapter 3: Amalgamation of Lands
    - Chapter 4: Sub-division of Buildings
  - Part 9A: Powers of Attorney
  - Part 10: Preparation and Maintenance of Registers on Final Title
    - Chapter 1: The Registers
    - Chapter 2: (Repealed)
    - Chapter 3: Final Title in Continuation of Final Title
    - Chapter 4: Replacement of Register Document of Final Title
  - Part 11: Final Title and Qualified Title
    - Chapter 1: Introductory
    - Chapter 2: Alienation under Qualified Title
    - Chapter 3: Qualified Title in Continuation
    - Chapter 4: Conversion of Qualified Title into Final Title
  - Part 12: Surrender of Title
    - Power to Surrender
    - Procedure for Surrender of Whole
    - Procedure for Surrender of Part Only
    - Surrender and Re-alienation Contiguous Lots Held under Land Office Title
    - Surrender and Re-alienation Special Provisions
- Division IV: Alienated Lands: Dealings
  - Part 13: General
  - Part 14: Transfers
    - Powers of Transfer
    - Transfers of Land
    - Transfers of Undivided Shares
    - Transfers of Leases and Charges
    - Transfers of Exempt Tenancies
  - Part 15: Leases and Tenancies
    - Chapter 1: Powers of Leasing, etc.
    - Chapter 2: Express and Implied Provisions
    - Chapter 3: Forfeiture
    - Chapter 4: Determination of Leases and Tenancies
  - Part 16: Charges and Liens
    - Chapter 1: Creation of Charges, and General Provisions Relating Thereto
    - Chapter 2: Implied Provisions
    - Chapter 3: Remedies of Chargees: Sale
    - Chapter 4: Remedies of Chargees: Possession
    - Chapter 5: Discharge
    - Chapter 6: Liens
  - Part 17: Easements
    - Chapter 1: Creation
    - Chapter 2: Release, Extinguishment and Cancellation
  - Part 18: Registration of Dealings
    - Chapter 1: Presentation of Instruments for Registration
    - Chapter 2: Procedure Generally
    - Chapter 3: Determination of Fitness for Registration
    - Chapter 4: Manner of Registration
    - Chapter 5: Powers of Attorney
    - Chapter 6: Cancellation of Registration
    - Chapter 7: Endorsement of Exempt Tenancies
  - Part 19: Restrains on Dealing
    - Chapter 1: Caveats
    - Chapter 2: Prohibitory Orders
- Division V: Alienated Lands - Supplemental
  - Part 20: Indefeasibility of Title and Interest
  - Part 21: Co-proprietorship and Trusts
    - Chapter 1: Co-proprietorship
    - Chapter 2: Trusts
  - Part 22: Transmission on Death and Bankruptcy
    - Death
    - Bankruptcy
  - Part 23: Reversion in Absence of Proprietor
  - Part 24: Re-survey of Land Having Natural Boundaries
  - Part 25: Sub-divided Buildings
- Division VI: General and Miscellaneous
  - Part 26: General Powers and Duties of the Registrar
  - Part 27: Searches
  - Part 28: Land Administrator's Rights of Way
  - Part 29: Survey
    - Chapter 1: General
    - Chapter 2: Deposited Plans
  - Part 30: Registration of Statutory Vesting
  - Part 31: Jurisdiction of the Court
  - Part 31A: Power of Investigation
  - Part 32: Powers of Arrest and Seizure and Penalties
  - Part 33: Service and Publication of Notices
  - Part 33A: Restrictions in Respect of Non-Citizens and Foreign Companies
  - Part 34: Miscellaneous
  - Part 35: Repeals, Transitional Provisions, etc.
- Schedules
