= Green Wave (Malaysia) =

Political phenomenon in Malaysia

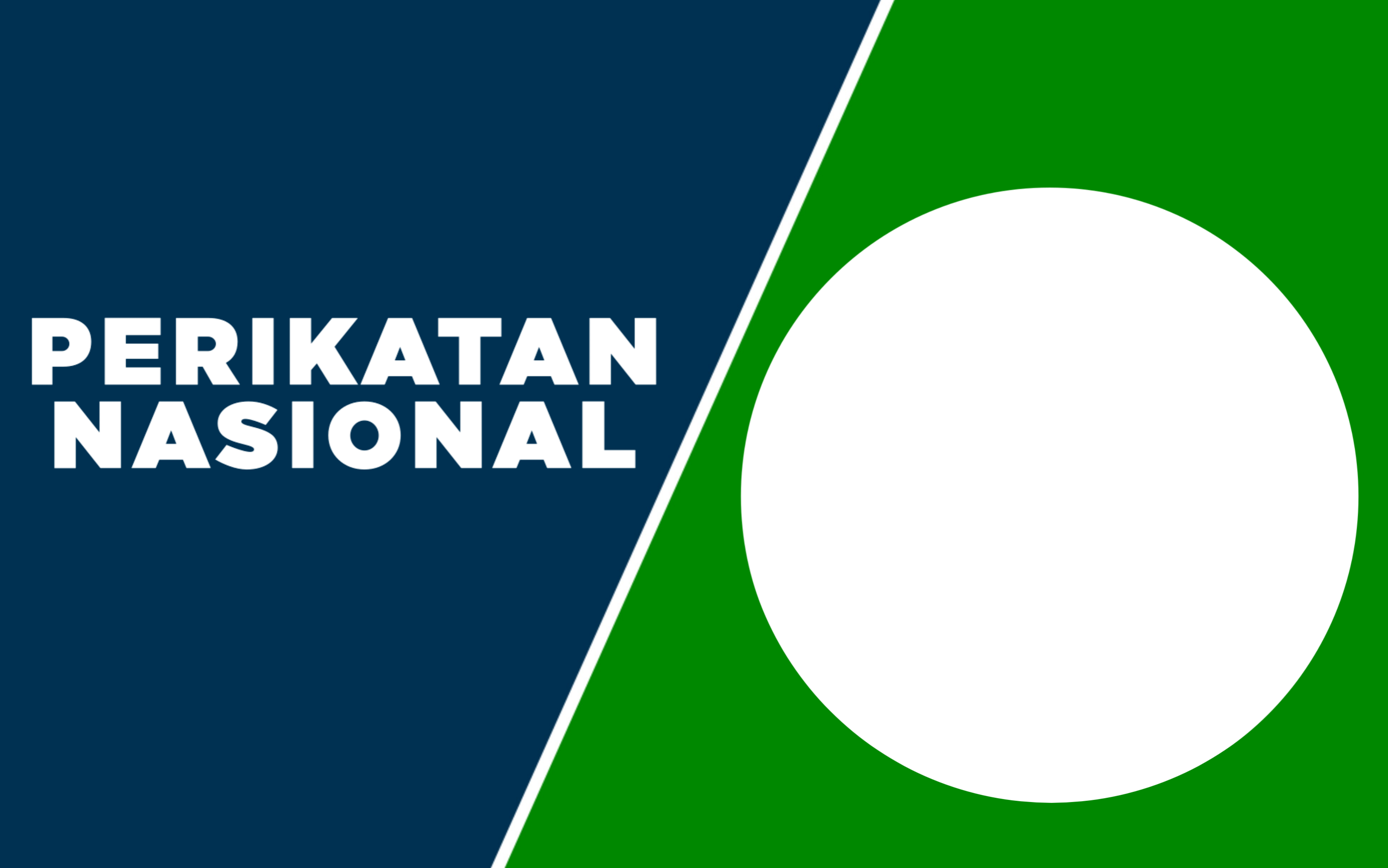
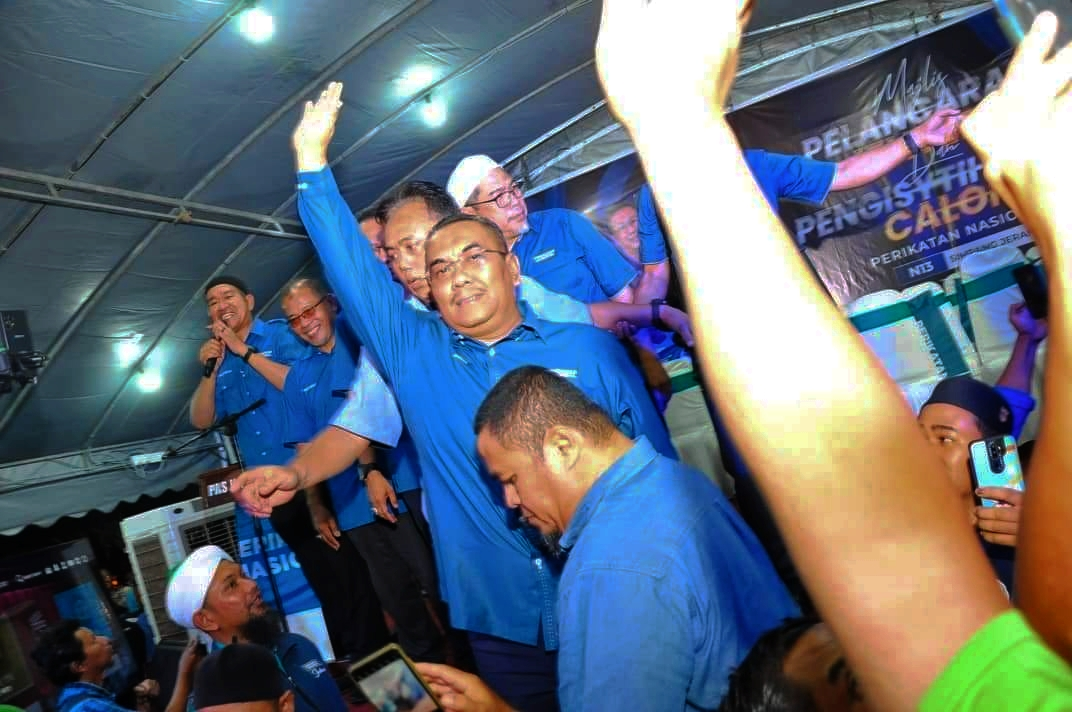
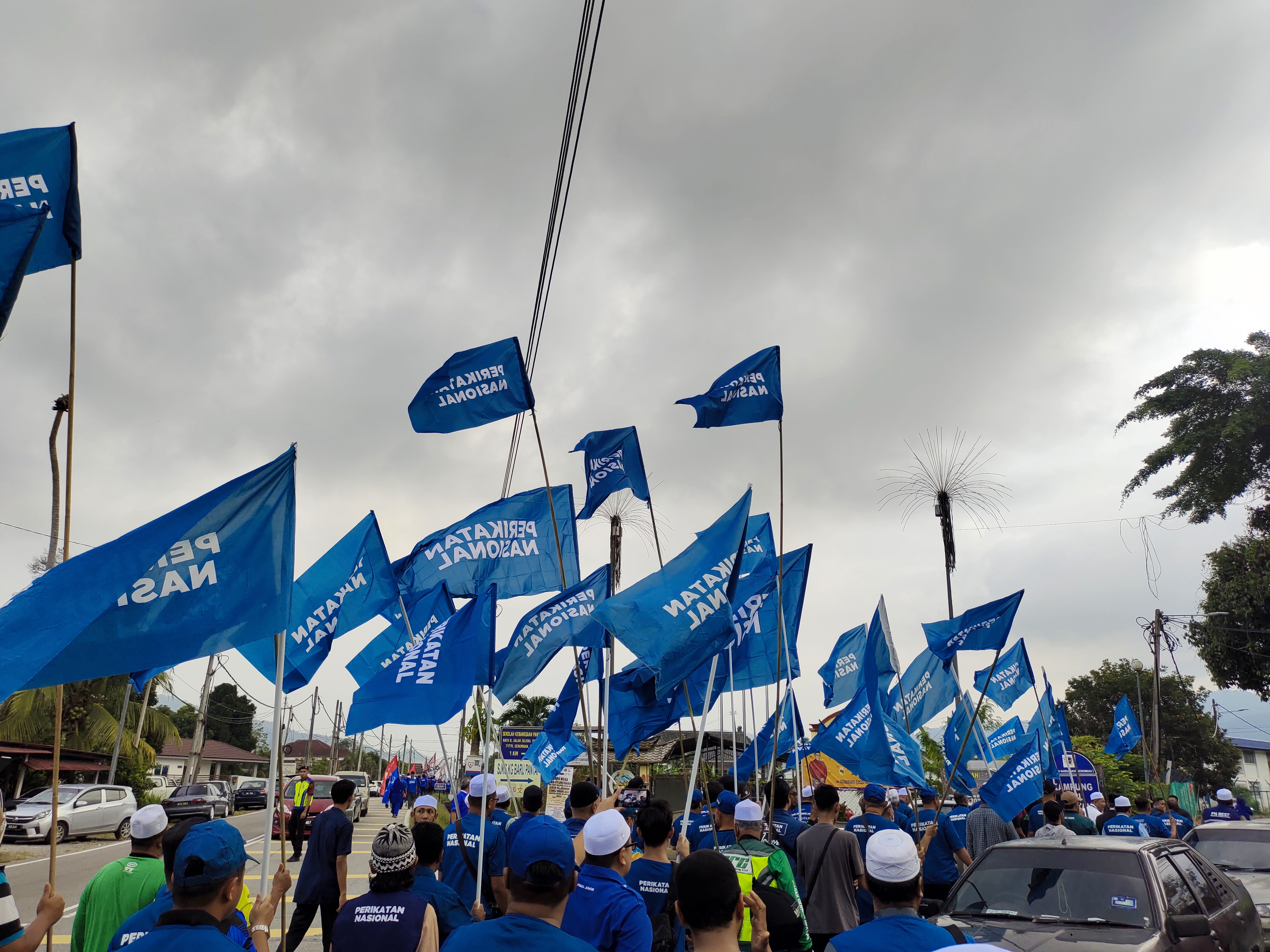
Clockwise from top:
Perikatan Nasional (PN) and Malaysian Islamic Party (PAS) symbols used in the elections, PAS symbol only used in Kelantan and Terengganu while PN symbols used in other states; PN supporters wave their flags on the nomination day for the 2023 Malaysian state elections of Negeri Sembilan in Lenggeng; Proportion of ethnic Malay with indigenous and Chinese voters in the 2018 Malaysian parliamentary constituency; Muhammad Sanusi Md Nor doing a salute with his supporters in Johor; PAS supporters performing salah at a mosque in Terengganu.

The Green Wave (Malay: Gelombang Hijau) or Green Tsunami (Malay: Tsunami Hijau) refers to a political phenomenon that took place in Malaysia during the 2022 general and 2023 state elections, in which the Malaysian Islamic Party (PAS) and its allies achieved significant electoral victories in parts of Peninsular Malaysia.

== Background and key people ==
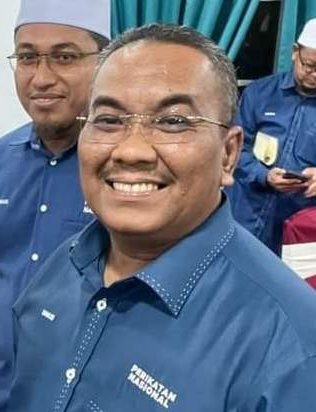
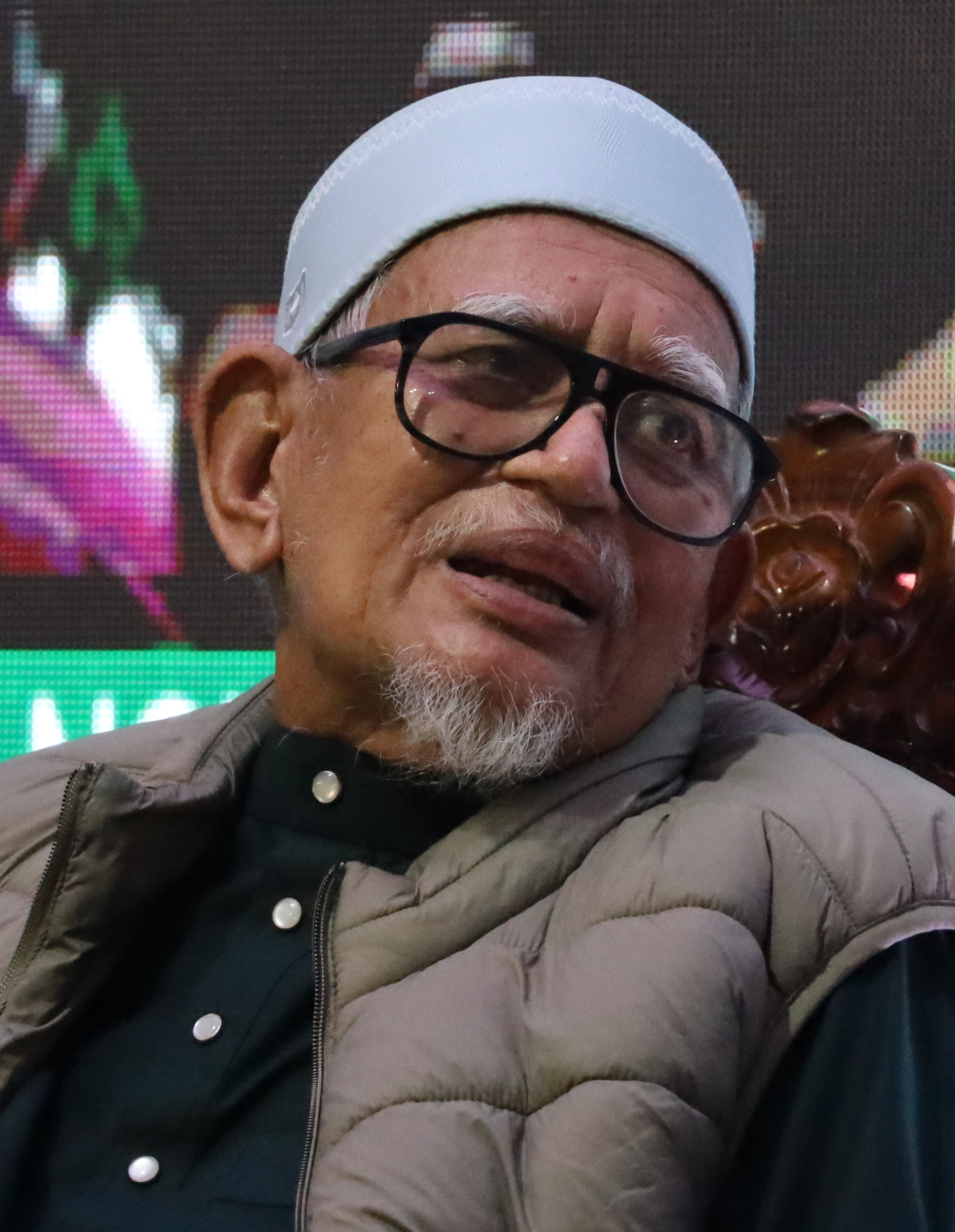
Muhammad Sanusi Md Nor and Abdul Hadi Awang, two important figures responsible for the Green Wave in Malaysian politics (particularly in Peninsula Malaysia).

In 2018, the long-ruling Barisan Nasional was defeated electorally and the broadly reformist Pakatan Harapan coalition entered government on an anti-corruption platform. However, the new government proved to be unpopular, but especially so among the country's ethnic Malays, many of whom expressed concern about the preservation of Malay rights under the new government.

In 2020, Mahathir Mohamad resigned as prime minister after fewer than two years in the position. The decision led to the 2020–2022 Malaysian political crisis and the formation of a Perikatan Nasional coalition government, which included the United Malays National Organisation (UMNO)-led Barisan Nasional, Mahathir's Malaysian United Indigenous Party (BERSATU), and the Malaysian Islamic Party (PAS), among others, an arrangement which brought the three largest Malay parties into a single Malay-led government.

The United Malays National Organisation is seen and often presents itself as the champion of Ketuanan Melayu and protector of Malay interests. It was the predominant party in Malaysian politics from independence up until 2018, and leads the Barisan Nasional coalition. Following Najib Razak's imprisonment for corruption, the party has been led by Ahmad Zahid Hamidi. It held 41 seats in the lower house of parliament upon its dissolution in 2022.

The Malaysian United Indigenous Party is a Malay nationalist party founded by former UMNO members over Najib's leadership and corruption scandals such as 1MDB. The party was a member of Pakatan Harapan. Following its exit from that coalition and Mahathir's resignation as party chairman, it has been led by Muhyiddin Yassin, who formed Perikatan Nasional and became prime minister in 2020. It held 28 seats in the lower house of parliament upon its dissolution in 2022.

The Malaysian Islamic Party is an Islamist party with Malay nationalist influences. The party is led by Abdul Hadi Awang, a member of the party's ulama (religious scholar) faction, who has been its president since 2002. Muhammad Sanusi Md Nor, a member of the party's professional faction, is the election director of Perikatan Nasional as well as Chief Minister of Kedah. Its electoral base is centered around Peninsular Malaysia's rural and conservative northern and eastern coasts, known as the Malay-Muslim heartland. It held 17 seats in the lower house of parliament upon its dissolution in 2022.

Political and social discourse in Malaysia has long been dominated by three elements collectively referred to as the 3Rs; race, religion, and royalty. Ethnic and religious exclusivism has been institutionalised in the country, and discussions of related issues often take the form of a culture war. Political parties are often understood and differentiated by their position vis a vis Bumiputera (Malay) rights, the status of Islam, and royal institutions.

The 2022 general election was the first to be held following the UNDI18 amendments which lowered the voting age from 21 to 18 and introduced automatic voter registration. This led to a 40% increase in the size of the electorate between the 2018 and 2022 elections. Of the 21.1 million voters eligible to vote in 2022, 1.4 million were aged between 18 and 20.

== The Green Wave in effect ==
Results for 2022 general election. PN swept all the seats in northeast and northwest Peninsular Malaysia except Sungai Petani.

The Perikatan Nasional (PN) coalition became the second-largest coalition following the 2022 Malaysian general election, with a total of 74 seats between its members; the Malaysian Islamic Party (PAS) with 43, the Malaysian United Indigenous Party (BERSATU) with 31, and the Malaysian People's Movement Party (GERAKAN) which failed to win a seat.

The coalition was most successful in the states of Kelantan and Terengganu in the northeast, where it contested using the Malaysian Islamic Party's symbol, and Perlis and Kedah in the northwest where it used the dark blue of Perikatan Nasional. In these four states, the coalition won a combined total of 39 of 40 seats available. Of this number, 27 were won by the Malaysian Islamic Party while 12 were won by the Malaysian United Indigenous Party.

Its remaining victories were exclusively achieved in Malay-majority constituencies located on Peninsular Malaysia, once the stronghold of the United Malays National Organisation, except for a single seat in Sabah. Of these seats, ranging from Penang and Perak in the east, Pahang on the west coast, and Malacca and Johor in the south, the Malaysian Islamic Party secured a more modest 16, while the Malaysian United Indigenous Party won 19.

The coalition's strong performance was replicated in the three state legislature elections held concurrently. In Perlis, it won 14 of the 15 seats available, allowing it to form the first non-Barisan Nasional government in the state's history. However, despite winning a plurality of seats in Perak and tying for most seats in Pahang, it remained in opposition in both states.

In the state elections held in 2023, Perikatan Nasional won 146 out of 245 seats available. Its performance in these elections largely followed the same pattern as in 2022; in the northern states of Kedah, Kelantan, and Terengganu, it won 108 of 113 seats available; 75% by the Malaysian Islamic Party. In the states of Penang, Selangor, and Negeri Sembilan, the coalition won just 38 of 132 seats, with a more even split between the Malaysian Islamic Party and the Malaysian United Indigenous Party.

== Analysis by commentators ==
"Currently, PAS seeks to strengthen the politics of Malay-Islam and we are obliged to lead the way by providing support and cooperation to unite the Malays through Islam. The aim is to restore the power of the Malay-Muslim leadership with the agenda of leading the unity of the people."

— Abdul Hadi Awang, May 2023

Although it failed to win the election outright, Perikatan Nasional's sweeping victories in the northeastern and northwestern states led commentators to coin the term "Green Wave" and "Green Tsunami", referencing the colour green, which is associated and used by the Malaysian Islamic Party.

Popular framing of the phenomenon has characterised it as the result of a rise in conservatism, Malay nationalism, and Islamism. Political rhetoric during the 2022 election campaign shifted toward the right, with discourse dominated by ethno-religious issues. A pre-election survey of Muslim youth aged 15–25 showed that religion represented the primary identity marker at 45%. Meanwhile, over two-thirds of respondents agreed that Sharia should have equal standing to the common law or replace it entirely, and that Hudud should be implemented. More than two-thirds also believed in the involvement of Islam in politics, and that Islam should influence public life.

That Muslim youth by-and-large held the notion that Islam should play some role in governance and influence public life, i.e. Islamisation, was reinforced by a study involving Malays aged 10–35 from Peninsular Malaysia conducted between 2023 and 2024. The study also indicated that multiculturalism was regarded positively by most, with the caveat that it did not infringe on the position of Islam or status of Malay and Bumiputera rights. In general, racial and religious sentiment was found to play a role in the decision making of those identifying as Malay and Muslim. Citing its report on the 2018 general election, where the Green Wave is considered by the think thank Iman Research to have truly started, as well as interviews during the 2022 campaign period, it believed Malay voters in the 2022 election based their support for a particular party or leader on their opposition to corruption and commitment to defend Malay rights.

The 2022 election also saw an increase in social media use as a method of campaigning, with Perikatan Nasional's use of TikTok credited by analysts and researchers as being particularly effective at helping secure first time voters for the coalition. Videos attacking Pakatan Harapan as anti-Muslim and pro-LGBTQ were often circulated before being taken down by TikTok, while one excerpt of a speech made by Perikatan Nasional chairman Muhyiddin Yassin alleging that Christians and Jews intended to colonise the country with the help of Pakatan Harapan was viewed over 600,000 times. He later claimed to have been taken out of context.

Youth votes have also been regarded as one of the main reasons for Perikatan Nasional's scale of victory; analysis of data from the 2022 election by Malaysiakini showed the coalition finishing ahead in 84 of 159 peninsular seats examined (of 165) when only votes by those under the age of 30 were counted. In a similar vein, analysis by The Straits Times showed that seats won by the coalition also had a higher proportion of voters aged between the age of 18 and 39. Conversely, the coalition had considerably less support among older voters, who were more likely to vote for either Pakatan Harapan or Barisan Nasional.

However, political researcher Bridget Welsh has argued that the impact of the youth vote in bringing about the Green Wave has been overstated. Her analysis found that support for Perikatan Nasional among young voters, in this case those aged 18 to 30, was only slightly higher than that of Pakatan Harapan. Welsh also estimated that young voters in states governed by Perikatan Nasional, where it had the institutional resources and funding for youth outreach, voted for the coalition at a higher rate of 64–66%, compared to other states at 28–46%. Welsh argues this casts doubt on the notion that a rise in conservative attitudes per se was the decisive factor influencing voting behaviour in this demographic.

Welsh also found that most of the coalition's support from young voters came at the expense of the United Malay National Organisation, which shares the same Malay-Muslim constituency. The party had failed to win a majority of the Malay vote since 2008, and this trend continued into the 2022 election where the constituency shifted its support towards Perikatan Nasional. The coalition benefited from the party's failure to distance itself from the corruption under former premier Najib Razak, and ran a campaign incorporating anti-corruption, religiosity, and maintaining political stability. The party continued to bleed support to the coalition in the 2023 state election, despite contesting on a combined ticket with Pakatan Harapan; dissatisfaction with its cooperation with the secular and Chinese-majority Democratic Action Party (DAP) as part of the post-2022 "unity government" has been cited as a major factor alongside the unpopularity of party president Ahmad Zahid Hamidi.

The popular framing of the Green Wave as the downstream effect of the Islamisation process undertaken by previous Malaysian governments has also been challenged to varying degrees. Researchers Nicholas Chen and Hew Wai Heng have argued that the increase in support for Perikatan Nasional in 2022 could be more accurately described as the consequence of a rise in general nativist and majoritarian sentiment among Malay-Muslims. However, they conceded that this process often intersected with Islamisation.

United Malays National Organisation politician Khairy Jamaluddin and political analyst Ong Kian Ming have both criticised the framing and use of the Green Wave nomenclature, arguing that the rise in support for the coalition among Malays went beyond simple religious extremism, and that popular discourse surrounding the phenomenon often veered into Islamophobia.

Political scientist Hidekuni Washida, in his analysis of voting behaviour in the 2022 election, posits that while the core of Perikatan Nasional's support were primarily concerned with ethno-religious issues, and that the results of the election solidifed the existence of an ethnic cleavage in the country's politics, the scale of its victory was achieved due to a last-minute swing in its favour among undecided Malay voters, for whom economic issues represented the biggest concern. In addition, despite the coalition's success at garnering the youth vote, these voters were not necessarily wedded to the coalition's ideology. These findings, he argued, cast doubt on the narrative of rising ethno-religious extremism as the cause of Perikatan Nasional's electoral successes.

== See also ==
- Conservatism in Malaysia
- Ketuanan Melayu
- Political tsunami
- 2008 Malaysian opposition wave
- Reformasi (Malaysia)
