= Political tsunami =

Term describing landslide electoral results

In Malaysian politics, a political tsunami (Malay: tsunami politik), also known as a political wave (Malay: gelombang politik) is a term that describes a sudden landslide victory in an election. The term was popularised during the 2008 Malaysian general election. It also describes a major and sudden change in the political landscape.

== Background and Chinese Tsunami ==
Results for 2008 general election, with PR coalition denied the government its two-thirds majority in parliament.

Though the term was famous only during 2008 Malaysian general election, in fact, the prior election produced a landslide victory to Barisan Nasional. BN won 198 seats, the highest ever in Malaysian history.

Across the term, support for Prime Minister Abdullah Ahmad Badawi gradually decreased. Former Prime Minister Mahathir Mohamad, who had handed over power to Abdullah in 2003, became increasingly critical of his successor's leadership, particularly regarding issues of governance and policy direction. Entering the 2008 election, the opposition launched its campaign, advocating for a change of government. Later on, BN unexpectedly suffered major losses, failing to secure a two-thirds majority for the first time since 1969. Losing five states and left with only 140 seats, pressures rose as Abdullah was later asked to resign.

One notable factor in BN's defeat in the election is loss of support from ethnic minorities. Previously, Malaysian Chinese Association, Malaysian Indian Congress and Parti Gerakan Rakyat Malaysia were able to win many seats (MCA alone won more seats than the opposition combined in 2004). Chinese voters swung their votes towards the opposition, mainly to Democratic Action Party and People's Justice Party. This event was described as the "Chinese Tsunami" (Malay: Tsunami Cina) by political commentators.

== Green Wave ==
Results for 2022 general election, with PN coalition swept all seats in east coast and northwest coast of Peninsular Malaysia.

The 2022 Malaysian general election resulted in Perikatan Nasional (PN) winning an unprecedented 73 (later 74) seats. Many of its gains were northern Peninsular seats that had been held by Barisan Nasional. For the first time, United Malays National Organisation failed to become largest individual party in the Dewan Rakyat after the Malaysian Islamic Party won 43 seats. PN won all but one seat across the northern states.

This result was only predicted during the last days of campaign. Prior to the polling day, PN was projected to become the third-largest alliance in the Dewan Rakyat, behind Barisan Nasional and Pakatan Harapan. However, PN's campaigning brought it to second place in the opinion polls. The party even won seats that had previously been BN or PH strongholds in southern states, such as Putrajaya (which BN had won since its creation) and Kapar and Kuala Langat (both PH safe seats). This outcome was dubbed the "Green Wave" (Malay: Gelombang Hijau) (Note: Also known as Green Tsunami (Malay: Tsunami Hijau), otherwise known as People Wave (Malay: Gelombang Rakyat), alternatively known as Perikatan Nasional Wave (Malay: Gelombang Perikatan Nasional), shortened as PN Wave (Malay: Gelombang PN).) (referring to PAS' official colour of green) by both the media and politicians, notably from DAP and PN.

== See also ==
- Wipeout (elections)
- Wave elections in the United States
  - 2026 United States elections, which were referred to as a "blue tsunami"
- Pink tide
- Conservative wave
