= Upp =

Upp may refer to:

- Unpentpentium, an unsynthesized chemical element with atomic number 155 and symbol Upp
- Upp (band), a British rock/jazz fusion band
  and their album Upp (album) released in 1975
- Jerry Upp (1883–1937), an American Major League Baseball player
- Rex Upp, a president of the Association of Environmental & Engineering Geologists
- Ultimate++, an open source IDE and widget toolkit

== See also ==
- UPP (disambiguation)
