= Mohd Misbahul Munir Masduki =

Malaysian politician

Yang Berhormat Ustaz Mohd Misbahul Munir Masduki KMN MP
- مُحَمَّد مِصْبَاحُ ٱلْمُنِير مَصْدُوقِي

Member of the Malaysian Parliament for Parit Buntar
- Incumbent
- Assumed office 19 November 2022
- Preceded by: Mujahid Yusof Rawa (PH–AMANAH)
- Majority: 5,395 (2022)

Personal details
- Born: Mohd Misbahul Munir bin Masduki; 1 June 1963 (age 63) Selekoh, Hilir Perak District (now under Bagan Datuk District), Perak, Malaysia
- Party: Malaysian Islamic Party (PAS)
- Other political affiliations: Pakatan Rakyat (PR) (2008–2015); Gagasan Sejahtera (GS) (2016–2020); Perikatan Nasional (PN) (since 2020)
- Spouse: Jamidah Sandang (died 2025)
- Children: 7
- Education: University of Malaya; National University of Malaysia
- Occupation: Politician
- Profession: Educator

Mohd Misbahul Munir bin Masduki (born 1 June 1963) is a Malaysian politician who has served as the Member of Parliament (MP) for Parit Buntar since November 2022. He is a member and the Yang di-Pertua (Division Chief) of Parit Buntar of the Malaysian Islamic Party (PAS), a component party of the Perikatan Nasional (PN) coalition. He previously was the Yang di-Pertua of Bagan Datuk from 2005 to 2025.

== Election results ==
Perak State Legislative Assembly
Year	Constituency	Candidate	Votes	Pct	Opponent(s)	Votes	Pct	Ballots cast	Majority	Turnout
1999	N47 Rungkup	Mohd Misbahul Munir Masduki (PAS)	4,313	47.92%	Abdullah Ahmad (UMNO)	4,688	52.08%	9,364	375	60.13%
2004	N53 Rungkup	Mohd Misbahul Munir Masduki (PAS)	3,459	36.17%	Sha'arani Mohamad (UMNO)	5,789	60.53%	9,564	2,330	67.60%
2008	N53 Rungkup	Mohd Misbahul Munir Masduki (PAS)	4,530	45.95%	Sha'arani Mohamad (UMNO)	4,984	50.56%	9,858	454	70.86%
2013	N53 Rungkup	Mohd Misbahul Munir Masduki (PAS)	5,802	46.21%	Shahrul Zaman Yahya (UMNO)	6,415	51.09%	12,556	613	82.10%
2018	N54 Hutan Melintang	Mohd Misbahul Munir Masduki (PAS)	3,150	12.58%	Khairuddin Tarmizi (UMNO)	10,961	43.76%	25,048	741	84.93%
2018	N54 Hutan Melintang	Mohd Misbahul Munir Masduki (PAS)	3,150	12.58%	Manivannan Gowindasamy (PKR)	10,220	40.80%	25,048	741	84.93%

Parliament of Malaysia
Year	Constituency	Candidate	Votes	Pct	Opponent(s)	Votes	Pct	Ballots cast	Majority	Turnout
2022	P057 Parit Buntar	Mohd Misbahul Munir Masduki (PAS)	23,223	43.90%	Mujahid Yusof Rawa (AMANAH)	17,828	33.70%	53,596	5,395	77.23%
2022	P057 Parit Buntar	Mohd Misbahul Munir Masduki (PAS)	23,223	43.90%	Imran Mohd Yusof (UMNO)	11,593	21.91%	53,596	5,395	77.23%
2022	P057 Parit Buntar	Mohd Misbahul Munir Masduki (PAS)	23,223	43.90%	Rohijas Md Sharif (PEJUANG)	259	0.49%	53,596	5,395	77.23%

== Honours ==
=== Honours of Malaysia ===
- Malaysia
  - Recipient of the 17th Yang di-Pertuan Agong Installation Medal (2025)
  - Officer of the Order of the Defender of the Realm (KMN) (2021)

== See also ==
- Parit Buntar (federal constituency)
