= No Money Down =

No Money Down may refer to:

== Music ==
- "No Money Down" (Lou Reed song), 1986
- "No Money Down" (Chuck Berry song), recorded in 1955
- No Money Down: Greatest Hits, Volume 1, compilation album featuring John Sinclair (poet)
- "No Money Down" by Jerry Butler, track on compilation album Strictly Breaks Volume 11
- "No Money Down", track on 1996 album Smile! by The Remo Four

== Other uses ==
- No Money Down Cultural Society at The Khyber arts centre, Halifax, Nova Scotia, Canada
- "No Money Down", 1997 episode of High Incident TV series
- "No Money Down", 1995 episode of Grace Under Fire TV series

== See also ==
- "A No Money Down", song by Scream on 1991 compilation album It's Your Choice
- Subprime mortgage crisis
