= Hutan Melintang (state constituency) =

State constituency in Perak, Malaysia

Hutan Melintang (N54)
Perak constituency

State constituency
- Legislature: Perak State Legislative Assembly
MLA
Wasanthee Sinnasamy
PH
- Constituency created: 1959
- First contested: 1959
- Last contested: 2022

Demographics
- Electors (2022): 38,513

Hutan Melintang is a state constituency in Perak, Malaysia that was represented in the Perak State Legislative Assembly from 1959 and is currently represented in 2018. The current state assemblywoman for Hutan Melintang is Wasanthee Sinnasamy from Pakatan Harapan. Hutan Melintang is currently located under the Bagan Datuk federal constituency.

The state constituency was created in the 1958 redistribution and was mandated to return a single member to the Perak State Legislative Assembly under the first past the post voting system.

== Demographics ==
Ethnic breakdown of Hutan Melintang's electorate as of 2022
1. Malay (50.8%)
2. Indian (28.8%)
3. Chinese (18.8%)
4. Other ethnicities (1.67%)

== History ==
=== Polling districts ===
According to the federal gazette issued on 31 October 2022, the Hutan Melintang constituency is divided into 22 polling districts.

State constituency	Polling Districts	Code	Location
Hutan Melintang (N54)	Tanah Lalang	075/54/01	SK Tanah Lalang
Hutan Melintang (N54)	Sungai Dulang	075/54/02	SK Sungai Dulang Dalam
Hutan Melintang (N54)	Kampong Sungai Buloh	075/54/03	SK Sungai Buloh
Hutan Melintang (N54)	Simpang Ampat	075/54/04	SK Simpang Empat; SK Tanjong Bayan
Hutan Melintang (N54)	Kampong Baharu Batu 16	075/54/05	SK Kampung Baharu
Hutan Melintang (N54)	Kuala Bernam Estate	075/54/06	SMK Khir Johari
Hutan Melintang (N54)	Batu Dua Estate	075/54/07	SK Bagan Pasir
Hutan Melintang (N54)	Bagan Pasir	075/54/08	SJK (C) Bagan Pasir Laut
Hutan Melintang (N54)	Parit 4	075/54/09	SMK Khir Johari
Hutan Melintang (N54)	Parit 7	075/54/10	SK Khir Johari
Hutan Melintang (N54)	Sungai Sumun	075/54/11	SK Sungai Sumun
Hutan Melintang (N54)	Parit 13	075/54/12	SJK (T) Ladang Flemington
Hutan Melintang (N54)	Parit 21	075/54/13	SJK (C) Pooi Seng
Hutan Melintang (N54)	Hutan Melintang	075/54/14	SJK (C) Keow Min; SMK Hutan Melintang
Hutan Melintang (N54)	Batu Dua Belas	075/54/15	SK Hutan Melintang
Hutan Melintang (N54)	Jalan Feri	075/54/16	SJK (T) Barathi
Hutan Melintang (N54)	Kampong Baharu Jendarata	075/54/17	SJK (C) Yeong Seng
Hutan Melintang (N54)	Jendarata	075/54/18	SJK (T) Ladang Jendarata 1
Hutan Melintang (N54)	Jenderata Estate Div. 3	075/54/19	SJK (T) Ladang Jenderata Bhg 3
Hutan Melintang (N54)	Kampong Kebun Baru	075/54/20	SMK Seri Perkasa
Hutan Melintang (N54)	Kampong Telok Buloh	075/54/21	SK Teluk Buloh
Hutan Melintang (N54)	Kampong Kota	075/54/22	SK Sungai Keli

=== Representation history ===
Members of the Legislative Assembly for Hutan Melintang
Assembly	No	Years	Name	Party
Constituency created
1st	N38	1959-1964	Sulaiman Bulon	Alliance (UMNO)
2nd	N38	1964-1969	Mohd. Abas Ahmad	Alliance (UMNO)
		1969-1971	Assembly dissolved	
3rd	N38	1969-1973	Mohd. Abas Ahmad	Alliance (UMNO)
3rd	N38	1973-1974	Mohd. Abas Ahmad	BN (UMNO)
4th	N42	1974-1978	Mahwany @ Radziah Marahuddin	BN (UMNO)
5th	N42	1978-1982	Mahwany @ Radziah Marahuddin	BN (UMNO)
6th	N42	1982-1986	Mahwany @ Radziah Marahuddin	BN (UMNO)
7th	N42	1986-1990	Mahwany @ Radziah Marahuddin	BN (UMNO)
8th	N42	1990-1995	Rajoo Govindasamy	BN (MIC)
9th	N48	1995-1999	Rajoo Govindasamy	BN (MIC)
10th	N48	1999-2004	Rajoo Govindasamy	BN (MIC)
11th	N54	2004-2008	Rajoo Govindasamy	BN (MIC)
12th	N54	2008-2013	Kesavan Subramaniam	PR (PKR)
13th	N54	2013-2018	Kesavan Subramaniam	PR (PKR)
14th	N54	2018-2022	Khairuddin Tarmizi	BN (UMNO)
15th	N54	2022–present	Wasanthee Sinnasamy	PH (PKR)

== Election results ==
Perak state election, 2022
Party	Candidate	Votes	%	∆%
PH	Wasanthee Sinnasamy	11,924	43.06	▲43.06
BN	Khairuddin Tarmizi	10,794	38.98	▼6.07
PN	Khairun Nizam Marosm	4,976	17.97	▲17.97
Total valid votes		27,694	100.00	
Total rejected ballots		485		
Unreturned ballots		73		
Turnout		28,252	71.91	▼13.02
Registered electors		38,513		
Majority		1,130	4.08	▲1.03
PH gain from BN		Swing		?

Perak state election, 2018
Party	Candidate	Votes	%	∆%
BN	Khairuddin Tarmizi	10,961	45.05	▲0.11
PKR	Manivannan Gowindasamy	10,220	42.00	▼9.19
PAS	Mohd Misbahul Munir Masduki	3,150	12.95	▲12.95
Total valid votes		24,331	97.14	
Total rejected ballots		593	2.37	
Unreturned ballots		124	0.50	
Turnout		25,048	84.93	▲1.63
Registered electors		31,242		
Majority		741	3.05	▼3.20
BN gain from PKR		Swing		?
Source(s) "RESULTS OF CONTESTED ELECTION AND STATEMENTS OF THE POLL AFTER THE OFFICIAL ADDITION OF VOTES". Archived from the original on 2023-04-28.

Perak state election, 2013
Party	Candidate	Votes	%	∆%
PKR	Kesavan Subramaniam	10,155	51.19	▼5.01
BN	Supramaniam Ramalingam	8,915	44.94	▲1.14
Independent	Mat Sidi Hashim	413	2.08	▲2.08
Pan-Malaysian Islamic Front	Azahari Abdullah	353	1.80	▲1.72
Total valid votes		19,836	96.70	
Total rejected ballots		636	3.10	
Unreturned ballots		41	0.20	
Turnout		20,513	83.30	▲13.18
Registered electors		24,637		
Majority		1,240	6.25	▼6.15
PKR hold		Swing		
Source(s) "KEPUTUSAN PILIHAN RAYA UMUM DEWAN UNDANGAN NEGERI". Archived from the original on 2022-05-23.

Perak state election, 2008
Party	Candidate	Votes	%	∆%
PKR	Kesavan Subramaniam	7,804	56.20	▲21.20
BN	Thangasvari Suppiah	6,083	43.80	▼21.20
Total valid votes		13,887	95.40	
Total rejected ballots		636	4.37	
Unreturned ballots		33	0.23	
Turnout		14,556	70.12	▲4.70
Registered electors		20,758		
Majority		1,721	12.40	▼17.60
PKR gain from BN		Swing		?
Source(s) "KEPUTUSAN PILIHAN RAYA UMUM DEWAN UNDANGAN NEGERI PERAK BAGI TAHUN 2008".

Perak state election, 2004
Party	Candidate	Votes	%	∆%
BN	Rajoo Govindasamy	8,145	65.00	▲6.78
PKR	Madzi Hasan	4,386	35.00	▼6.78
Total valid votes		12,531	95.61	
Total rejected ballots		555	4.23	
Unreturned ballots		21	0.16	
Turnout		13,107	65.42	▲5.09
Registered electors		20,035		
Majority		3,759	30.00	▲13.56
BN hold		Swing		
Source(s) "KEPUTUSAN PILIHAN RAYA UMUM DEWAN UNDANGAN NEGERI PERAK BAGI TAHUN 2004".

Perak state election, 1999
Party	Candidate	Votes	%	∆%
BN	Rajoo Govindasamy	7,063	58.22	▼19.99
PKR	J.P. Annah Dorai	5,068	41.78	▲41.78
Total valid votes		12,131	94.77	
Total rejected ballots		653	5.10	
Unreturned ballots		16	0.13	
Turnout		12,800	60.33	▼0.74
Registered electors		21,216		
Majority		1,995	16.44	▼39.98
BN hold		Swing		
Source(s) "KEPUTUSAN PILIHAN RAYA UMUM DEWAN UNDANGAN NEGERI PERAK BAGI TAHUN 1999".

Perak state election, 1995
Party	Candidate	Votes	%	∆%
BN	Rajoo Govindasamy	9,069	78.21	▲14.76
S46	Muhammad Abdullah	2,527	21.79	▼14.76
Total valid votes		11,596	94.87	
Total rejected ballots		599	4.90	
Unreturned ballots		28	0.23	
Turnout		12,223	61.07	▼7.45
Registered electors		20,015		
Majority		6,542	56.42	▲29.52
BN hold		Swing		
Source(s) "KEPUTUSAN PILIHAN RAYA UMUM DEWAN UNDANGAN NEGERI PERAK BAGI TAHUN 1995".

Perak state election, 1990
Party	Candidate	Votes	%	∆%
BN	Rajoo Govindasamy	7,883	63.45	▲5.17
S46	M.A. Vadiveloo	4,540	36.55	▲36.55
Total valid votes		12,423	93.89	
Total rejected ballots		809	6.11	
Unreturned ballots		0	0.00	
Turnout		13,232	68.52	▲1.45
Registered electors		19,312		
Majority		3,343	26.90	▼10.34
BN hold		Swing		
Source(s) "KEPUTUSAN PILIHAN RAYA UMUM DEWAN UNDANGAN NEGERI PERAK BAGI TAHUN 1990".

Perak state election, 1986
Party	Candidate	Votes	%	∆%
BN	Mahwany @ Radziah Marahuddin	7,956	68.62	▼3.36
PAS	Abdul Aziz Abas	3,639	31.38	▲3.36
Total valid votes		11,595	100.00	
Total rejected ballots		564		
Unreturned ballots		0		
Turnout		12,159	67.07	▼4.51
Registered electors		18,129		
Majority		4,317	37.23	▼6.73
BN hold		Swing		
Source(s) "KEPUTUSAN PILIHAN RAYA UMUM DEWAN UNDANGAN NEGERI PERAK BAGI TAHUN 1986".

Perak state election, 1982
Party	Candidate	Votes	%	∆%
BN	Radziah Maharuddin	8,354	71.98	▲4.75
PAS	Mohamad Aris Bakri	3,252	28.02	▲13.21
Total valid votes		11,606	100.00	
Total rejected ballots		580		
Unreturned ballots		0		
Turnout		12,186	71.58	▼1.98
Registered electors		17,024		
Majority		5,102	43.96	▼8.46
BN hold		Swing		

Perak state election, 1978
Party	Candidate	Votes	%	∆%
BN	Radziah Maharuddin	6,769	67.23	▼12.63
PAS	Hafith Jaafar	1,491	14.81	▲14.81
DAP	Mustafa Manap	1,490	14.80	▲1.24
UPP	L. Moorthy	318	3.16	▲3.16
Total valid votes		10,068	100.00	
Total rejected ballots		695		
Unreturned ballots		0		
Turnout		10,763	73.56	▲8.41
Registered electors		14,632		
Majority		5,278	52.42	▼13.88
BN hold		Swing		

Perak state election, 1974
Party	Candidate	Votes	%	∆%
BN	Radziah Maharuddin	5,849	79.86	▲79.86
DAP	Govindaraju Sami Naidu	993	13.56	▲13.56
PEKEMAS	Mohamad Ngah	482	6.58	▲6.58
Total valid votes		7,324	100.00	
Total rejected ballots		991		
Unreturned ballots		0		
Turnout		8,315	65.14	▲0.38
Registered electors		12,764		
Majority		4,856	66.30	▲48.26
BN hold		Swing		-

Perak state election, 1969
Party	Candidate	Votes	%	∆%
Alliance	Mohamad Abas Ahmad	4,102	59.02	▼8.25
PMIP	Mohamad Ngah	2,848	40.98	▲16.16
Total valid votes		6,950	100.00	
Total rejected ballots		1,058		
Unreturned ballots		0		
Turnout		8,008	64.77	▼8.95
Registered electors		12,364		
Majority		1,254	18.04	▼24.40
Alliance hold		Swing		

Perak state election, 1964
Party	Candidate	Votes	%	∆%
Alliance	Mohamad Abas Ahmad	4,778	67.27	▲2.27
PMIP	Ibrahim Dahalan	1,763	24.82	▼10.19
UDP	Hamzah Lop	562	7.91	▲7.91
Total valid votes		7,103	100.00	
Total rejected ballots		647		
Unreturned ballots		0		
Turnout		7,750	73.72	▲8.46
Registered electors		10,513		
Majority		3,015	42.45	▲12.46
Alliance hold		Swing		

Perak state election, 1959
Party	Candidate	Votes	%
Alliance	Sulaiman Bulon	3,121	64.99
PMIP	Adnan Abdul Samad	1,681	35.01
Total valid votes		4,802	100.00
Total rejected ballots		304	
Unreturned ballots		0	
Turnout		5,106	65.26
Registered electors		7,824	
Majority		1,440	29.99
This was a new constituency created.
