= Shahrul Zaman Yahya =

Malaysian politician

Yang Berhormat Dato' Shahrul Zaman Yahya DPCM DPSM AMP MLA
- شهرالزمان يحيى

Member of the Perak State Executive Council
- In office 31 March 2020 – 21 November 2022
- Monarch: Nazrin Shah
- Menteri Besar: Ahmad Faizal Azumu (2020); Saarani Mohammad (2020–2022)
- Portfolio: Industry, Investment and Corridor Development
- Preceded by: Asmuni Awi (Industry); Mohammad Nizar Jamaluddin (Investment and Corridor Development)
- Succeeded by: Loh Sze Yee
- Constituency: Rungkup
- In office 12 May 2014 – 12 May 2018
- Monarch: Nazrin Shah
- Menteri Besar: Zambry Abdul Kadir
- Portfolio: Human Resources, Youth and Sports
- Preceded by: Samsudin Abu Hassan (Human Resources); Himself (Youth and Sports)
- Succeeded by: Sivanesan Achalingam (Human Resources); Lee Chuan How (Youth and Sports)
- In office 18 May 2013 – 12 May 2014
- Monarchs: Azlan Shah (2013–2014); Nazrin Shah (2014–2018)
- Menteri Besar: Zambry Abdul Kadir
- Portfolio: Youth and Sports, Communication and Multimedia
- Preceded by: Zainol Fadzi Paharudin (Youth and Sports); Hamidah Osman (Communication and Multimedia)
- Succeeded by: Himself (Youth and Sports); Nolee Ashilin Mohammed Radzi (Communication and Multimedia)
- Constituency: Rungkup

Member of the Perak State Legislative Assembly for Rungkup
- Incumbent
- Assumed office 5 May 2013
- Preceded by: Sha'arani Mohamad (BN–UMNO)
- Majority: 613 (2013); 3,069 (2018); 3,409 (2022)

Personal details
- Born: Perak, Malaysia
- Citizenship: Malaysian
- Party: United Malays National Organisation (UMNO)
- Other political affiliations: Barisan Nasional (BN)
- Occupation: Politician

Shahrul Zaman bin Yahya is a Malaysian politician who was a member of the Perak State Executive Council (EXCO) in the Barisan Nasional (BN) state administration under former Menteri Besar Zambry Abdul Kadir from May 2013 to the collapse of the BN state administration in May 2018 and Perikatan Nasional (PN)-led state administration under former Menteri Besar Ahmad Faizal Azumu from March 2020 to December 2020, which later transitioned to the BN-led state administration from December 2020 until November 2022. He has served as Member of the Perak State Legislative Assembly (MLA) for Rungkup since May 2013. He is a member and the Vice Division Chief of Bagan Datuk of the United Malays National Organisation (UMNO), a component party of the federal ruling BN coalition which is aligned with the federal ruling Pakatan Harapan coalition at the federal and state levels.

== Election results ==
Perak State Legislative Assembly
Year	Constituency	Candidate	Votes	Pct	Opponent(s)	Votes	Pct	Ballots cast	Majority	Turnout
2013	N53 Rungkup	Shahrul Zaman Yahya (UMNO)	6,415	52.51%	Mohd Misbahul Munir Masduki (PAS)	5,802	47.59%	17,409	613	83.00%
2018	N53 Rungkup	Shahrul Zaman Yahya (UMNO)	6,529	52.58%	Hatim Musa (AMANAH)	3,460	27.85%	12,430	3,069	77.37%
2018	N53 Rungkup	Shahrul Zaman Yahya (UMNO)	6,529	52.58%	Mohd Mohkheri Jalil (PAS)	2,430	19.57%	12,430	3,069	77.37%
2022	N53 Rungkup	Shahrul Zaman Yahya (UMNO)	7,023	49.55%	Munzirie Kabir (AMANAH)	3,614	25.50%	14,443	3,409	73.43%
2022	N53 Rungkup	Shahrul Zaman Yahya (UMNO)	7,023	49.55%	Mohd Mohkheri Jalil (PAS)	3,537	24.95%	14,443	3,409	73.43%

== Honours ==
- Malacca
  - Companion Class II of the Exalted Order of Malacca (DPSM) – Datuk (2011)
- Perak
  - Knight Commander of the Order of Cura Si Manja Kini (DPCM) – Dato' (2015)
  - Member of the Order of the Perak State Crown (AMP) (2009)
