= Sing Sing (song) =

"Sing Sing" is a song by disco-funk band Gaz, a project of keyboardist Thor Baldursson, guitarist Mats Bjoerklund, and producer Jürgen Korduletsch. It appeared on the group's only album, Gaz, and was released as a 12" single in 1978, Salsoul Records catalog number SG206.

"Sing Sing" has been sampled by hip hop artists such as Grandmaster Flash, Wu-Tang Clan, Chubb Rock, and Lil Jon. In the early 1990s, it was featured prominently in breakbeat tracks from the Baltimore club genre, where DJs looped and modified it using Ensoniq ASR-10 samplers and Mackie mixers. In the early 2000s it also became a staple of the Jersey club sound.

The song was featured on the fourth volume of Street Beat Records' Ultimate Breaks and Beats collection.

In October 2013, Salsoul Records filed a lawsuit against Kylie Minogue and Warner Bros., claiming that Minogue copied the "entire rhythm" of "Sing Sing" in her 2007 song "Speakerphone."
