= Khairuddin Tarmizi =

Malaysian politician

Khairuddin Tarmizi PPT
- خير الدين ترمذي

Member of the Perak State Legislative Assembly for Hutan Melintang
- In office 9 May 2018 – 19 November 2022
- Preceded by: Kesavan Subramaniam (PR–PKR)
- Succeeded by: Wasanthee Sinnasamy (PH–PKR)
- Majority: 741 (2018)

Personal details
- Born: Khairuddin bin Tarmizi
- Citizenship: Malaysian
- Party: UMNO
- Other political affiliations: Barisan Nasional
- Occupation: Politician

Khairuddin bin Tarmizi is a Malaysian politician from UMNO. He was the Member of Perak State Legislative Assembly for Hutan Melintang from 2018 to 2022.

== Politics ==
He is the Deputy Chairman of UMNO Bagan Datuk branch.

== Election results ==
Perak State Legislative Assembly
Year	Constituency	Candidate	Votes	Pct.	Opponent(s)	Votes	Pct.	Ballots cast	Majority	Turnout
2018	N54 Hutan Melintang	Khairuddin Tarmizi (UMNO)	10,961	45.05%	Manivannan Gowindasamy (PKR)	10,220	42.00%	25,048	741	84.93%
2018	N54 Hutan Melintang	Khairuddin Tarmizi (UMNO)	10,961	45.05%	Mohd Misbahul Munir Masduki (PAS)	3,150	12.95%	25,048	741	84.93%
2022	N54 Hutan Melintang	Khairuddin Tarmizi (UMNO)	10,794	38.98%	Wasanthee Sinnasamy (PKR)	11,924	43.06%	28,252	1,130	71.91%
2022	N54 Hutan Melintang	Khairuddin Tarmizi (UMNO)	10,794	38.98%	Khairun Nizam Marosm (BERSATU)	4,976	17.97%	28,252	1,130	71.91%

== Honours ==
- Perak
  - Recipient of the Distinguished Conduct Medal (PPT) (2002)
