= David Bunce =

British independent music producer

David Bunce (born 1950) is a British independent music producer, born in London, England. He was a member of the Epic Records signed group Upp, which included Jeff Beck, Andy Clark and Jim Copley. The group's albums, Upp (1975), and This Way Upp (1976), were both produced by, and featured Jeff Beck. More recently, under the name Zak Starstosky, Bunce is currently a member of the UK based blues/rock band Driving Sideways, releasing two albums, In the Beginning (1997) and Live at The Casino Ballroom in 1999. As of 2007, he is teaching the guitar to students and producing music for films, advertising, and television. As of 2018, he was performing an acoustic solo act.
