= Dusty Fingers =

Compilation album series by various artists
- Released: 1997 - 2006
- Recorded: various years
- Genre: Funk [general]
- Producer: Danny Dann & Jason Jaz

Dusty Fingers is the name of a series of compilation albums of songs, that are widely admired as breakbeats collected by Bronx DJ Danny Dann the Beat Mann. Some of the songs featured contain "open breaks" which are solo drum passages which enable DJs to easily transition into them. These are also attractive to producers, who loop or rearrange them to create new compositions. Following in the tradition of the Ultimate Breaks and Beats series, the Dusty Fingers records contain an eclectic range of musical styles; mainly funk and jazz, but also including soul, rock, disco, and pop.

Many of the songs in the Dusty Fingers series have been sampled into new musical compositions, mainly by hip hop producers. Popular songs that sample songs from the Dusty Fingers series include "Guilty Conscience" by Eminem, "Find Your Wealth" by Nas, "Rowdy Rowdy" by 50 Cent, "Show Me What You Got" by Jay-Z, "Daydreamin'" by Lupe Fiasco, and "Dr. Carter" by Lil' Wayne.

== Track listings ==
- Volume 1
  1. Intro
  2. "Tense Preparation" - Nick Ingman
  3. "Lady Love" - Ferrante & Teicher
  4. "The Windmills of Your Mind" - Dorothy Ashby
  5. "Forty Days" - Billy Brooks
  6. "Get Thy Bearings" - Donovan
  7. "Hogin's Machine" - Les Baxter
  8. "Kismet" - Amon Düül II
  9. "The Warnings" - David Axelrod
  10. "On the Hill" - Oliver Sain
  11. "Bamboo Child" - Ryo Kawasaki
  12. "Holding You, Loving You" - Don Blackman
  13. "Hey Jude" - The Overton Berry Trio
  14. "Survival" - Annette Peacock
  15. "Dee Dee Drums" - Dee Dee Warwick
  16. Outro
- Volume 2
  1. "Laying the Trap" - Charles Bernstein
  2. "Go On and Cry" - Les McCann
  3. "Snow Creatures" - Quincy Jones
  4. "Children of the Night" - Hysear Don Walker
  5. "Bettina" - Bola Sete
  6. "Electric Surfboard" - Brother Jack McDuff
  7. "Smokey Joe the Dreamer" - Bullet
  8. "Soul Sides" - Art Farmer
  9. "Ripped Open by Metal Explosions" - Galt MacDermot
  10. "Holy Thursday" - David Axelrod
  11. "Shore Line Drive" - Sammy Nestico
  12. "You're No Good" - Harvey Averne
  13. "Puzzle" - Passport (Skit)
  14. "Faded Lady" - S.S.O (Skit)
- Volume 3
  1. "Dermier Domicile Connu" - Generique
  2. "Shady Blues" - Pete Moore
  3. "Come Together" - The Phoenix Authority
  4. "Packed Up" - Bill Conti
  5. "Take Me with You" - Lyn Christopher
  6. "Pulp" - Steve Grey
  7. "Go Home, Pigs" - Ronald Stein
  8. "A Divine Image" - David Axelrod
  9. "While My Guitar Gently Weeps" - Jimmy Ponder
  10. "Return from Ashes" - John Dankworth
  11. "Darkest Light" - Lafayette Afro Rock Band
  12. "Safari" - Frank Walton
  13. "A Day in the Life" - Les DeMerle
  14. "The Spic" - Bullet
- Volume 4
  1. "Le Bracelet" - Alain Goraguer
  2. "Psychedelic Portrait" - Jack Arel
  3. "Going Out of My Head" - George Saxon
  4. "I Wonder" - The Bubble Gum Machine
  5. "The Beggar Song" - Wet Willie (Skit)
  6. "Night Moves" - F. McDonald
  7. "Funky Chimes" - Francis Coppieters
  8. "Accadde a Bali" - Arawak
  9. "Scratch" - Souflay
  10. "The Moving Finger" - Dorthy Ashby
  11. "Misty Canyon" - Sven Libaek
  12. "Wenn der Urlaub Kommt" - Manfred Krug
  13. "Selected Sound" - Hardys Jet Band
  14. "Loving You, Girl" - John Schroeder
- Volume 5
  1. "Solstice" - Brian Bennett
  2. "Algebrique" - Shoche
  3. "Signals" - Gerhard Trede And His Electronic Instruments
  4. "Mixed Drums" - Andy Loore
  5. "Love Sounds" - Intimate Strangers
  6. "Railroad" - Monk Higgins
  7. "Caccia al Cinese" - Franco Micalizzi
  8. "Soft Wind" - Gary Pacific Orchestra
  9. "Attention" - Head West (Drum Skit)
  10. "Jane B" - Jane Birkin
  11. "Bass in Action" - Toni Rubio
  12. "Dirty Drugs" - H. Thieme
- Volume 6
  1. "Power of the Drums"
  2. "Under Pressure" - Nick Ingman
  3. "La Dimostrazione" - Danielle Patucchi
  4. "Silhouttes" - Dick Walter
  5. "Compression" - Ed Scogillera
  6. "Crossing the Border" - Jerry Goldsmith
  7. "Big Noise from Winnetka" - Eric Delaney
  8. "Future Past" - Absolute Elsewhere
  9. "Here We Are" - Churchill
  10. "Tibetian Serenity" - Travis Biggs
  11. "Dancer" - Spacey
  12. "Mao" - Joe Ki Peter Tomas Sound Group
  13. Drum skit
  14. Drum skit
- Volume 7
  1. "Who is She and What is She to You?" - Madelaine
  2. "Rose Len" - Lennie Hibbert
  3. "Atlanta Inn" - Janne Schaffer
  4. "Space" - Tomorrow
  5. "L'Oiseau" - Alain Goraguer
  6. "Come Live with Me" - Dorothy Ashby
  7. "Walter L" - Jimmy Gordon
  8. "The Mudfoot" - Fat Albert
  9. "Hey, Jude" - Tuby Hayes
  10. "Monday, Monday" - Wally Richardson
  11. "Mickey Mouse Club" - Mike Curb Congregation
  12. "The Godfather" - The Professionals
  13. "Grigio Perla" - Gian Franco Pienzio
  14. "We're Only Just Begun" - Grant Green
- Volume 8
  1. "Time is Passing" - Sun
  2. "Kriminal Theme" - Les Maledictus Sound
  3. "The Big Climb" - Paul Kass Parry Music
  4. "Les Caïds" - François de Roubaix
  5. "In Necessity" - Kerrie Biddell
  6. "Shakespeare's Sonnet" - Alla Pugacheva
  7. "Fat, Fat Fellow" - Daniel Janin
  8. "Roots" - Ian Carr
  9. "Drums" - Niagra
  10. "Gloaming (De Wolfe Library)" - L. Decosne
  11. "The Tense Scene" - Alan Hawkshaw
  12. "Atlantis" - R.M.O.
  13. "Trying Hard to Look Inside" - Waters
  14. "Stone Folk" - The Adacement
  15. "Fragment of Fear" - Sight & Sound
- Volume 9
  1. "Hogan's Thing" - Simon Haseley
  2. "Who's Who" - Fred Merrett & Friends
  3. "Daydream" - Bernard Wystraete
  4. "Lightly Salted" - Barry Ungar
  5. "Bad Times" - Gerard McManon
  6. "Jamie's Theme" - Harnell
  7. "Super Snatch" - Flash Fearless
  8. "Pull Jabal Pull" - JJ Johnson
  9. "Interlude" - Brand New Funk
  10. "Being Tailed" - Roy Budd
  11. "Drumin" - Bill Near
  12. "War on the Streets" - Head Band
  13. "La Morte Accarezza a Mezzanotte" - Ed Ariete
  14. "Improv" - Ron Tutt & Jim Keltner
- Volume 10
  1. "Space Guerilla"- Missus Beastly
  2. "Son of Popcorn" - Franz Auffray
  3. "The Unknown" - Brian Bennett
  4. "Light My Fire" - Johnny Harris
  5. "Impulsion Drums" - Barry Cooper
  6. "Kombination" - Gunther Fischer Quintet
  7. "Drum Skit 2" (Zouche Drums 3) - Dave Holland
  8. "Chapeau Melon et Bottes de Cuir" - Laurie Johnson Orchestra
  9. "Requiem Pour un Con" - Serge Gainsbourg
  10. "Sand and Rain" - Nancy Holloway
  11. "Letrange Dr. Personne" - Carvelli
  12. "Relaxed Spacious" - A. Parker
  13. "Incidental Black Cloth" - K. Fleins Field
  14. "Lee Gagnon" - Scene des Guerriers
- Volume 11
  1. "Confunktion" - D. Richmond
  2. "Music People" - Jack Mayborn
  3. "Are You Free" - Larry Robins Sport Studio Band
  4. "Devil's Masquerade" - Syrius
  5. "Les Dunes Dostende" - Francois de Roubaix
  6. "Southbound" - Sound Studio Orchestra
  7. "African Honeymoon" - Golden Music Orchestra
  8. "Type A to E" - Hiro Tsunoda
  9. "Take Me to the Mardi Gras" - The Spotnicks
  10. "Flower Dance" - Michel Gonet
  11. "Brute (Part 1 and 2)" - Louis Clark
  12. "Overtone" - Nick Ingman
  13. "Allora il Treno" - Bruno Nicolai
  14. "Yama Yama (Yamasuki)" - Daniel Vangarde
  15. "Voyages" - Michel Polnareff
- Volume 12
  1. "The Fusion" - Jason Havelock
  2. "Caravan" - Puccio Roelens
  3. "Drama Blackcloth" - Alan Tew
  4. "Warlock" - R. Tilsley
  5. "Is That the Way" - The Message
  6. "The Prowler" - Brian Bennet
  7. "Gooseberry Fool" - P. Wilsher
  8. "Slow Soul" - The Travellers
  9. "Electric Blue" - Danny Edwardson
  10. "Light 6" - H. Flowers
  11. "Sally" - Frank Pleyer
  12. "Penguin" - Okay Temiz
  13. "New Religion" - Trifle
  14. "Oriental Vibrato [bonus]" - Raymond Guiyot
- Volume 13
  1. "Solitude of the Mountains" - Gil Flat
  2. "Thief" - The Enticers
  3. "Like a Friend" - Roger Webb
  4. "Puella! Puella!" - Man
  5. "Flower Pot" - Load Stone
  6. "Flashpoint" - Roger Jackson
  7. "Number One Spy" - Syd Dale
  8. "Profil Grec 1" - Vladimir Cosma
  9. "Escalation" - Nowy
  10. "Lost Star" - Anthony King
  11. "Act of Threat" - Berry Lipman
  12. "Name of the Game" - Brian Bennett
  13. "Thunderbird" - Johnny Pearson
  14. "Careveli" - April Orchestra
  15. "A Time for Us" - Joe Pass
  16. "Tickatoo" - Dizzy Man's Band
- Volume 14
  1. "Postaeolian Train Robbery" - Cos
  2. "Esconderijo" - Ze Rodrix
  3. "Kamen Rider" - Shunsuke Kikuchi
  4. "New Comer" - W. Rockman
  5. "The Theme From The Persuaders" - John Barry
  6. "Dream" - Shankar Family
  7. "Subtle Secret" - G. Studio Band
  8. "La Longue Marche" - Janko Nilovic
  9. "City Girl" - Main Attraction
  10. "Affanno" - Franco Micalizzi
  11. "Drums Away" - 2nd Generation
  12. "Maniac" - Steve Gray
  13. "Sentries Charge" - Al Hirt
  14. "Un Soir de Blanco" - Claude Thomain
- Volume 15
  1. "Sound Stage 4" - Alan Parker
  2. "Tatou Strip Tease" - Michel Audiard
  3. "Friend and Enamys" - John Williams
  4. "Swamp Lizard" - Olympic Runners
  5. "McQ" - Stanley Maxfield Orchestra
  6. "Dance Of The Vampires" - Vampires Of Dartmoor
  7. "Driving" - Driver OST
  8. "Tournament" - Dennis Farnon
  9. "Theme From Exorcist (Tubular Bells)" - Mike Oldfield
  10. "Orientale Contemplatino" - Rino De Filippi
  11. "Les Copans de la Basse" - Guy Pedersen
  12. "Don't Be Cool" - Jacky Giordano
  13. "I'm Gonna Love You Just a Little Bit More" - Uwe Buschkotter
  14. "Je Veux te Dire une Chanson" - Angelillo & Hamel
- Volume 16
  1. "Day Light (Intro)" - John Cavars
  2. "City Police" - Dave Gold
  3. "Beams" - Dieter Reith
  4. "Superfine from Behind Lady" - Cleveland Wrecking Co.
  5. "Caprivi Strip" - Mike Hankinson Big Band
  6. "Hey, Jude" - Rock-Jazz Rhythm
  7. "Me Libertei" - Toni Tornado
  8. "Klaun a Tanečnice" - Václav Neckář & Bacily
  9. "Lupin III" - Yuji Ohno & You's Explosion Band
  10. "Night Walk" - Peter Kater
  11. "Ano Mama Dayo" - Kenji Sawada
  12. Unknown title - Sukemitsu Kawaya (?)
  13. "She's a Lady" - Great Pride
  14. "Gatto Nero" - Franco Campanino
  15. "Killer Whale" - G.Sklair/G.Galbraith
  16. "Planetárium - Vchod" - Václav Neckář & Bacily
  17. "Go For Broke" - Steve Gray
  18. "Leathel Injection" - Jo Ji Thi
  19. "Dahni Dinha Mantha" - Daniel Janin
  20. "Maskerade" - Drukwerk
  21. "Superstition" - Pedro & Capricious
  22. "Assistant's Rag (When You're Hot, You're Hot)" - Mother Freedom Band
- Volume 17
  1. "Hit and Run at the Club" - Johnny Pate
  2. "A Pungi Nudi (Suite)" - Bixio Franco
  3. "Keep On Using Me" - Bill Moss and The Celestials
  4. "Stopover" - Laurie Johnson
  5. "Es Bleibt die Sonne" - Gerd Michaelis Chor
  6. "Na Opak" - Henryk Debich
  7. "Cat and Mouse in Berlin" - Roy Budd
  8. "Electrosorics N4 (Drums)" - Cecil Luter Georges Teperino
  9. "Hijack (Pt.1)" - Laurie Johnson
  10. "Blackout" - Mike Nock
  11. "Life" - Down Town Boogie Woogie Band
  12. "In Man Get" - Kollage Klatte
  13. "4 Tet" - Sadi
  14. "Last Tango in Paris" - Julio Gutiérrez
  15. "Percussion Vol.1 (Drums)" - Bruton
