= Sha'arani Mohamad =

Malaysian politician

Yang Berbahagia Dato' Sha'arani Mohamad DPMP AMN

Member of the Perak State Legislative Assembly for Rungkup
- In office 21 March 2004 – 5 May 2013
- Preceded by: Abdullah Ahmad
- Succeeded by: Shahrul Zaman Yahya
- Majority: 2,330 (2004); 454 (2008)

Deputy Head of Bagan Datuk Division of UMNO
- In office 2004–2013
- Head: Ahmad Zahid Hamidi

Personal details
- Born: 1950
- Died: 5 November 2018 (aged 67–68) Hospital Raja Perempuan Zainab II, Kota Bharu, Kelantan
- Resting place: Tanah Perkuburan Islam Langgar, Kota Bharu, Kelantan
- Party: United Malays National Organisation (UMNO)
- Other political affiliations: Barisan Nasional (BN)
- Children: Nor Shazila
- Occupation: Politician

Dato' Sha'arani bin Mohamad (1950–5 November 2018) was a former Member of the Perak State Legislative Assembly for Rungkup from 2004 to 2013. He is also the former Deputy Head of UMNO Division of Bagan Datuk under its leader, Ahmad Zahid Hamidi.

== Death ==
He died on 5 November 2018 at Raja Perempuan Zainab II Hospital, Kota Bharu, Kelantan at 1.36 am and was buried at Langgar Islamic Cemetery, Kota Bharu, Kelantan.

== Election results ==
Perak State Legislative Assembly
Year	Constituency	Candidate	Votes	Pct	Opponent(s)	Votes	Pct	Ballots cast	Majority	Turnout
2004	N53 Rungkup	Sha'arani Mohamad (UMNO)	5,789	62.60%	Mohd Misbahul Munir Masduki (PAS)	3,459	37.40%	9,564	2,330	67.60%
2008	N53 Rungkup	Sha'arani Mohamad (UMNO)	4,984	52.39%	Mohd Misbahul Munir Masduki (PAS)	4,530	47.61%	9,858	454	70.86%

== Honours ==
- Malaysia
  - Member of the Order of the Defender of the Realm (AMN) (2004)
- Perak
  - Knight Commander of the Order of the Perak State Crown (DPMP) – Dato' (2009)
