= Ultimate Breaks and Beats =

Series of compilation albums

Ultimate Breaks and Beats (also commonly abbreviated as UBB) was a series of 25 compilation albums released from 1986 to 1991 by Street Beat Records and edited by "BreakBeat Lou" Flores and "BreakBeat Lenny" Roberts. Featured on the albums were funk, R&B, soul, jazz and rock tracks from the 1960s to 1980s that included influential drum breaks.

The albums found high popularity with hip hop producers, with each new release in the series leading to many records featuring samples of the breaks. In this way, the series impacted the soundscape of rap, hip hop, dance, and pop music in general.

Re-releases of the LPs, some packaged in pairs for DJ scratching and mixing convenience, became available and are currently found in many record stores. CDs of some of the volumes may be found as well, including a 2-CD and DVD box set featuring nearly all of the tracks on the 25 albums.

== Releases ==
Complete track listing, taken from Geocities.com and updated with performers' names, missing in the track lists of volumes SBR 499, SBR 500 and the first version of SBR 508.

An asterisk after a track name indicates that the song was remixed for inclusion in this compilation.

=== Not official ===
==== SBR 499 ====
1. The Limit – "She's So Divine" (from CP-721 12-inch single) (1982)
2. Kashif – "I Just Gotta Have You (Lover Turn Me On)" (from CP-728 12-inch single) (1982)
3. Kenton Nix featuring Bobby Youngblood – "There's Never Been (No One Like You)" (from WES 22130 12-inch single) (1980)
4. Mr. Magic – "Magic's Message (There Has to Be a Better Way)" (from POS-1213 12-inch single) (1984)

==== SBR 500 ====
1. Tia Monae – "Don't Keep Me Waiting" (from CART-320 12-inch single) (1983)
2. Cloud One – "Flying High" (from HS-1010 12-inch single) (1982)
3. Ednah Holt – "Serious, Sirius Space Party" (from WES 22138 12-inch single) (1981)
4. Convertion – "Let's Do It" (from S-12336 12-inch single) (1980)

=== Official start of the series ===
==== SBR 501 ====
1. The Monkees – "Mary Mary"* (from More of the Monkees) (1967) Colgems Records
2. Wilbur "Bad" Bascomb – "Black Grass"* (from PAS-6048 7-inch single) (1972) Paramount Records
3. The Winstons – "Amen, Brother"* (from MMS-117 7-inch single) (1969) Metromedia Records***
4. 7th Wonder – "Daisy Lady" (from Climbing Higher) (1979) Parachute Records
5. D.C. LaRue – "Indiscreet" (from The Tea Dance) (1976) Pyramid Records
6. Rufus Thomas – "Do the Funky Penguin" (from STA-0112 7-inch single) (1971) Stax Records
- The break on "Amen Brother" was pitched down from 45 rpm to 33 1/3 rpm

==== SBR 502 ====
1. Wilson Pickett – "Get Me Back on Time, Engine #9"* (from Wilson Pickett in Philadelphia) (1970) Atlantic Records
2. Juice – "Catch a Groove"* (from DGD-108 12-inch single) (1976) Greedy Records
3. The Rolling Stones – "Honky Tonk Women"* (from Through the Past, Darkly (Big Hits Vol. 2)) (1969) London Records
4. Funkadelic – "You'll Like it Too" (from Connections & Disconnections) (1981) LAX Records
5. Roy Ayers Ubiquity – "Boogie Back" (from Change Up the Groove) (1974) Polydor Records
6. Orchestra Internationale featuring Sal Conte – "Chella llà" (from Disco Italiano) (1974) Fiesta Records

==== SBR 503 ====
1. Cheryl Lynn – "Got to Be Real" (from Cheryl Lynn) (1978) Columbia records
2. Incredible Bongo Band – "Apache" (from Bongo Rock) (1973) Pride/MGM Records
3. Herman Kelly & Life – "Dance to the Drummer's Beat" (from Percussion Explosion) (1978) TK Disco / Alston / Electric Cat Records
4. Incredible Bongo Band – "Bongo Rock"* (from Bongo Rock) (1973) Pride/MGM Records
5. Upp – "Give It to You" (from Upp) (1975) Epic Records
6. Jackie Robinson – "Pussyfooter"* (from I'm Different) (1977) Les Disques Direction Records

==== SBR 504 ====
1. Syl Johnson – "Different Strokes"* (from TM-2242 7-inch single) (1967) Twilight Records
2. Bobby Byrd – "I Know You Got Soul"* (from I Need Help) (1970) King Records
3. Z. Z. Hill – "I Think I'd Do It"* (from The Brand New Z.Z. Hill) (1971) Mankind Records
4. Gaz – "Sing Sing" (from Gaz) (1979) SalSoul Records
5. Isaac Hayes – "Breakthrough" (from the Truck Turner soundtrack) (1974) Enterprise Records
6. Tom Jones – "Looking Out My Window"* (from "45-40035" 7-inch single (1968) Parrot Records ***Note: Looking Out My Window" does not appear on the 1968 LP "Help Yourself" although it does so on later cd reissues.
7. Dynamic Corvettes – "Funky Music Is the Thing Part 2" (from ABET-5459 7-inch single) (1975) Abet Records

==== SBR 505 ====
1. Johnny "Hammond" Smith – "Shifting Gears"* (from Gears) (1975) Milestone Records
2. Bo Diddley – "Hit or Miss"* (from Big Bad Bo) (1974) Cadet / Chess Records
3. The Wild Magnolias – "(Somebody Got) Soul, Soul, Soul"* (from The Wild Magnolias) (1974) Polydor Records
4. Melvin Bliss – "Synthetic Substitution" (from SU-527 7-inch single) (1973) Sunburst Records
5. Freedom – "Get Up and Dance" (from Farther Than Imagination) (1979) TK Disco / Malaco Records
6. 20th Century Steel Band – "Heaven and Hell Is on Earth" (from Warm Heart, Cold Steel) (1975) United Artists Records
7. Banbarra – "Shack Up Part 2" (from UAXW-734Y 7-inch single) (1975)

==== SBR 506 ====
1. Please – "Sing a Simple Song" (from Please) (1975) Telefunken Records
2. James Brown – "Cold Sweat" (from Cold Sweat) (1967) King Records
3. The Cecil Holmes Soulful Sounds – "2001" (from The Black Motion Picture Experience) (1973) Buddah records
4. Dennis Coffey – "Son of Scorpio"* (from Electric Coffey) (1972) Sussex Records
5. The Magic Disco Machine – "Scratchin'"* (from Disc-O-Tech) (1975) Motown records
6. Fat Larry's Band – "Down on the Avenue" (from Feel It) (1976) WMot Records
7. Uncle Louie – "I Like Funky Music" (from "Uncle Louie's Here" – 12" Remix – MAR-434) Marlin Records (1979)

==== SBR 507 ====
1. James Brown – "Give It Up or Turnit a Loose" (from Sex Machine (album) (1970) (Note: The original version has the guitar hook, while both the remixed version and the live version have the drum breaks.) Polydor Records
2. Funky Constellation – "Street Talk (Madam Rapper)" (from FUNC-369 12-inch single) (1979) ROTA Records
3. Pleasure – "Let’s Dance" (from Accept No Substitutes) (1976) Fantasy Records
4. John Davis and the Monster Orchestra – "I Can’t Stop" (from Night and Day) (1976) SAM Records
5. John McLaughlin and the Mahavishnu Orchestra – "Planetary Citizen" (from Inner Worlds) (1975) CBS Records
6. Funkadelic – "Good Old Music" (from Funkadelic) (1970) Westbound Records
7. William Ray – "You Are What You Are" (Sammy Lee Pickens) (from DMT-1001 12-inch single) (1977) Magic Touch Records

=== Discontinued (see notes below) ===
==== SBR 508 ====
1. The Puppets – "The Way of Life" (from the QUS-055 12-inch single) (1983)
2. Wish & Fonda Rae – "Touch Me (All Night Long)" (from RHR 3376 12-inch single) (1984)
3. Up Front – "Infatuation" (from SC-16 12-inch single) (1983)
4. Stacye Branché – "Precious and Special" (from BO-03055 12-inch single) (1983)

=== Continued ===
==== SBR 509 ====
1. Ingrid – "Easter Parade" (from POSPX-529 12-inch single) (1982) Polydor Records
2. ESG – "UFO"* (from ESG) (1981) 99 Records
3. Billy Squier – "Big Beat" (from The Tale of the Tape) (1980) Capitol Records
4. Liquid Liquid – "Cavern" (from Optimo EP) (1983) 99 Records
5. Mountain – "Long Red"* (from Mountain Live: The Road Goes Ever On) (1972) Windfall Records
6. Tyrone Thomas and the Whole Darn Family – "Seven Minutes of Funk" (from Has Arrived) (1976) Soul International Records
    - Note UFO by ESG was pitched down from 45 rpm to 33 1/3 rpm****

==== SBR 510 ====
1. James Brown – "Funky President" (from Reality) (1974) Polydor Records
2. Dexter Wansel – "Theme from the Planets"* (from Life on Mars) (1976) Philadelphia International Records
3. Rhythm Heritage – "Theme from "S.W.A.T.""* (from Disco-Fied) (1978) ABC Records
4. The Jackson Five – "It's Great to Be Here"* (from Maybe Tomorrow) (1971) Motown Records
5. The Brothers Johnson – "Ain't We Funkin' Now" (12-inch Version ) (1978) A&M Records
6. La Pregunta – "Shangri La" (from GNP-12001 12-inch single) (1978) GNP Records
7. Esther Williams – "Last Night Changed It All (I Really Had a Ball)"*** ( Album version ) (1976) 'Friends & Co. Records

^{1} – The Lp, 45 rpm and the 12" of "Last Night Changed It All" are all different versions from one another.

^{2} – Note: "Theme from the Planets" was recorded at 45 rpm speed on this release.

==== SBR 511 ====
1. The Honey Drippers – "Impeach the President"* (from AL-1017 7-inch single) (1973) Alaga Records
2. The Headhunters – "God Make Me Funky" (from Survival of the Fittest) (1975) Arista Records
3. Lucy Hawkins – "Gotta Get Out of Here" (from S-12455 12-inch single) (1978) SAM Records
4. Orange Krush – "Action"* (from MDS-4018 12-inch single) (1982) Prep Street / Mercury Records
5. Funk, Inc. – "Kool Is Back" (from Funk, Inc.) (1971) Prestige Records
6. Fausto Papetti – "Love's Theme"* (from 18a Raccolta) (1975) Durium Records

==== SBR 512 ====
1. Junie – "Granny's Funky Rolls Royce" (from Freeze) (1975) Westbound Records
2. James Brown – "Funky Drummer"* (from King Records – 45-6290 7" single) (1969) King Records
3. The Mohawks – "The Champ" (from PM-719 7-inch single) (1968) Pama Records
4. Aerosmith – "Walk This Way" (from Toys in the Attic) (1975) Columbia Records
5. Thin Lizzy – "Johnny the Fox Meets Jimmy the Weed" (from Johnny the Fox) (1978) Mercury Records
6. The Soul Searchers – "Ashley's Roachclip"* (from Salt of the Earth) (1974) Sussex Records
7. Chicago Gangsters – "Gangster Boogie"* (from Blind Over You) (1975) Gold Plate Records
8. T-Connection – "Groove to Get Down" (from On Fire) (1977) Dash Records

==== SBR 513 ====
1. Babe Ruth – "The Mexican" (from First Base) (1973) Harvest / EMI Records
2. Babe Ruth – "Keep Your Distance"* (from Kid's Stuff) (1976) Capitol Records
3. Coke Escovedo – "(Runaway) I Wouldn't Change a Thing" (from Comin' at Ya) (1976) ^{2} Mercury Records
4. Eastside Connection – "Frisco Disco" (from AFT-1001 12-inch single) (1978) Rampart Records
5. In Search Of...Orchestra – "Phenomena Theme" (from AVID-12146 12-inch single) (1977) AVI Records
6. The Meters – "Handclapping Song" (from Struttin') (1970) Josie Records

^{2} – "(Runaway) I Wouldn't Change a Thing" is actually two songs by Coke Escovedo put into one track: the ending of "Runaway" and "I Wouldn't Change a Thing".

==== SBR 514 ====
1. Stanley Turrentine and Milt Jackson – "Sister Sanctified" (from Cherry) (1972) CTI Records
2. J. J. Johnson – "Willie Chase" (from the Willie Dynamite soundtrack) (1974) MCA Records
3. Kid Dynamite – "Uphill Peace of Mind" (from Kid Dynamite) (1976) Cream Records
4. Ralph MacDonald – "Jam on the Groove" (from Sound of a Drum) (1976) Marlin Records
5. Experience Unlimited – "Knock Him Out Sugar Ray" (from VMT-25 12-inch single) (1980) Vermack Records
6. Fred Wesley & The J.B.'s – "Blow Your Head" (from Damn Right I Am Somebody) (1974) People Records

==== SBR 515 ====
1. Donald Byrd – "Change (Makes You Want to Hustle)" (from Places and Spaces) (1975) Blue Note Records
2. Roy Ayers – "Brother Green (The Disco King)" (from Mystic Voyage) (1975) Polydor Records
3. Grover Washington Jr. – "Mister Magic" (from Mister Magic) (1975) Motown Records
4. David Matthews – "Star Wars" (from Dune) (1977) CTI Records
5. John Cougar Mellencamp – "Jack and Diane" (from American Fool) (1982) Riva Records
6. Pleasure – "Bouncy Lady" (from Dust Yourself Off) (1975) Fantasy Records
7. Jefferson Starship – "Rock Music" (from Freedom at Point Zero) (1979) Grunt/RCA Records

==== SBR 516 ====
1. Commodores – "The Assembly Line" (from Machine Gun) (1974) Motown Records
2. Johnny Jenkins – "I Walk On Gilded Splinters" (from Ton-Ton Macoute!) (1974) Capricorn Records
3. Le Pamplemousse – "Gimme What You Got"* (from Le Pamplemousse) (1976) AVI Records
4. Marvin Gaye – "T Plays it Cool" (from Trouble Man – the soundtrack album for the film of the same name) (1972) Talma Records
5. Lyn Collins – "Think (About It)"* (from Think (About It)) (1972) People Records
6. The Galactic Force Band – "Space Dust"* (from Spaced Out Disco) (1978) Springboard Records
7. Steve Miller Band – "Take the Money and Run"* (from Fly Like an Eagle) (1976) Capitol Records

==== SBR 517 ====
1. Baby Huey – "Listen to Me" (from The Living Legend) (1971) Curtom Records
2. Bobbie Knight & The Universal Lady – "The Lovermaniacs (Sex)"* (from Earth Creature) (1974) Brunswick Records
3. The Pointer Sisters – "Yes We Can Can" (from Pointer Sisters) (1973) Blue Thumb Records
4. Monk Higgins – "One Man Band (Plays All Alone)" (from Dance to the Disco Sax) (1974) Buddah Records
5. Kool & The Gang – "N.T." (from Live at PJ's) (1971) De-Lite Records
6. Dyke & the Blazers – "Let a Woman Be a Woman, Let a Man Be a Man"* (from Greatest Hits) (1969) Original Sounds Records
7. Bram Tchaikovsky – "Whiskey and Wine" (live version from "The Girl Of My Dreams" 7" E.P.') (1979) Radar Records***note The song "Whiskey & Wine" was originally covered by the group The Motors and Bram Tchaikovsky was an original member. Their version from the album "1" is a studio recording and has no drum break***
8. "L.L. Bonus Beats" – Fancy – "Feel Good"* (from Wild Thing) (1974) Big Three Records BT 89502 ***note; Looped as a 1:40 min. bonus beat on vinyl edition at 45 rpm***.

==== SBR 518 ====
1. Bar-Kays – "Let's Have Some Fun" (from Flying High on Your Love) (1977) Mercury Records
2. Lafayette Afro Rock Band – "Conga" (from Malik) (1976) Makossa Records
3. Yellow Sunshine – "Yellow Sunshine" (from ZS72511 7-inch single) (1973) TSOP Records
4. The Jimmy Castor Bunch – "It's Just Begun"* (from It's Just Begun) (1972) RCA Records
5. Marva Whitney – "It's My Thing" (from It's My Thing) (1969) King Records
6. Kay Gees – "I Believe in Music" (from Find a Friend) (1976) Gang Records
7. Dennis Coffey – "Ride Sally Ride" (from Goin' for Myself) (1972) Sussex Records

^{4} – ***Note that the intro used in the beginning of the song is taken from the group's track "Troglodyte (Cave Man)".

==== SBR 519 ====
1. The Blackbyrds – "Rock Creek Park" (from City Life) (1975) Fantasy Records
2. KC and the Sunshine Band – "I Get Lifted" (from KC and the Sunshine Band) (1975) TK Disco Records
3. Brother Soul – "Cookies" (from LS-105 7-inch single) (1975) Leo Mini Records
4. Foster Sylvers – "Misdemeanor" (from Foster Sylvers) (1973) Pride / MGM Records
5. Wild Sugar – "Bring it Here" (from the TS-2004 12-inch single) (1981) TSOB Records
6. Miami – "Chicken Yellow" (from The Party Freaks) (1974) Drive Records
7. The Olympic Runners – "Put the Music Where Your Mouth Is" (from Put the Music Where Your Mouth Is) (1974) London Records
8. Lightnin' Rod – "Sport" (from Hustlers Convention) (1973) United Artists Records

==== SBR 520 ====
1. Roy Ayers – "Lonesome Cowboy"* (from Everybody Loves the Sunshine) (1976) Polydor Records
2. Duke Williams – "Chinese Chicken" (from Monkey in a Silk Suit is Still a Monkey) (1973) Capricorn Records
3. Joe Quarterman – "I'm Gonna Get You"* (from GSF Records 6915 7-inch single) (1974) GSF Records
4. Friend & Lover – "Reach Out of the Darkness"* (from Reach Out of the Darkness) (1973) Verve Forecast Records
5. The Chubukos – "House of Rising Funk" (from Soul Makossa) (1973) Mainstream / Red Lion Production Records
6. Eddie Bo – "Hook & Sling" (from Scram Records 117 7-inch single) (1969) Scram Records
7. Bill Withers – "Kissing My Love" (from Still Bill) (1971) Sussex Records

^{5} – The group was called The Chubukos for the 7-inch single, but they were called Afrique for their LP Soul Makossa.

==== SBR 521 ====
1. The Politicians – "Free Your Mind" (from The Politicians Featuring McKinley Jackson) (1972) Hot Wax Records
2. The Village Callers – "Hector" (from Live) (1967) Rampart Records
3. Joe Tex – "Papa Was Too"* (from ATL-70199 7-inch single) (1966) Dial / Atlantic Records
4. Sound Experience – "Devil with the Bust" (from Don't Fight the Feeling) (1974) Philly Soulville Records
5. James Brown – "Soul Pride" (from The Popcorn) (1969) King Records
6. All the People – "Cramp Your Style"* (from Blue Candle 1496 7-inch single) (1972) Blue Candle Records
7. Johnny Pate – "Shaft in Africa" (from Shaft in Africa soundtrack) (1973) ABC Records
8. Barry White – "I'm Gonna Love You Just a Little Bit More Baby"* (from I've Got So Much to Give) (1973) 20th Century Records
9. "L.L. Bonus Beats #2" – Tommy Roe – "Dizzy" (1969) ABC Records ***Note... Looped into a 1:40 min bonus beat.

==== SBR 522 ====
1. Barrabas – "Woman" (from Barrabas) (1972) RCA Records
2. Creative Source – "Corazon" (from Migration) (1974) Sussex Records
3. Southside Movement – "Save the World" (from Movin') (1974) 20th Century Records
4. The J.B.'s – "The Grunt (Part 1)"* (from Food for Thought) (1970) King Records
5. Rufus Thomas – "Do the Funky Penguin (Part 2)"* (from STA-0112 7-inch single) (1971) Stax Records
6. Shotgun – "Dynamite (The Bomb)"* (from Shotgun) (1977) ABC Records
7. Gary Numan – "Films" (from The Pleasure Principle) (1979) Beggars Banquet Records

==== SBR 523 ====
1. Rufus Thomas – "The Breakdown (Part II)"* (from Stax Records 2025060 7-inch single) (1971) Stax Records
2. Jim Dandy – "Country Cooking" (from Flash Fearless Versus the Zorg Women Parts 5 & 6) (1975) Chrysalis Records
3. Pleasure – "Joyous" (from Joyous) (1977) Fantasy Records
4. Solomon Burke – "Get Out of My Life, Woman"* (from I Wish I Knew) (1968) Atlantic Records
5. Alphonse Mouzon – "You Don't Know How Much I Love You" (from Funky Snakefoot) (1974) Blue Note Records
6. Delegation – "Oh Honey" (from Promise of Love) (1977) Shady Brook Records
7. Freda Payne – "The Easiest Way to Fall"* (from Band of Gold) (1970) Invictus Records

==== SBR 524 ====
1. Lowell Fulson – "Tramp" (from Tramp) (1967) Kent / United Records
2. Freddie Scott – "(You) Got What I Need" (from S233 7-inch single) (1968) Shout Records
3. Lyn Collins – "You Can't Love Me, If You Don't Respect Me" (from PE-650 7-inch single) (1973) People Records
4. The Emotions – "Blind Alley" (from Untouched) (1971) Volt / Stax Records
5. Lonnie Liston Smith – "Expansions (Part 1)" (from Expansions) (1975) Flying Dutchman Records
6. Otis Redding – "Hard to Handle"* (from The Immortal Otis Redding) (1968) ATCO Records
7. The Grass Roots – "You and Love Are the Same" (from Feelings) (1969) ABC / Dunhill Records
8. Tom Scott and the L.A. Express – "Sneakin' in the Back" (from Tom Scott and The L.A. Express) (1974) Ode Records

==== SBR 525 ====
1. Southside Movement – "I've Been Watching You" (from Southside Movement) (1973) 20th Century Records
2. Lou Donaldson – "Pot Belly" (from Pretty Things) (1970) Blue Note Records
3. Samba Soul – "Mambo #5" (from Samba Soul) (1977) RCA Records
4. Five Stairsteps – "Don't Change Your Love"* (from Love's Happening) (1968) Curtom Records
5. Lamont Dozier – "Take Off Your Make-up" (from Out Here on My Own) (1973) ABC Records
6. Ike White – "Love and Affection" (from Changin' Times) (1976) LAX Records
7. James Brown – "The Payback"* (from The Payback) (1973) Polydor Records

=== Oddities ===
There are some oddities in the collection, with releases SBR 499 and SBR 500 discontinued and now considered "unofficial", while SBR 508 was released with two different track listings. The later, alternate track listing for SBR 508 is as below.

==== SBR 508 ====
1. Incredible Bongo Band – "Sing, Sing, Sing" (from The Return of the Incredible Bongo Band) (1974)
2. J. J. Johnson – "Parade Strut" (from Willie Dynamite soundtrack) (1974)
3. Blowfly – "Sesame Street" (from Blowfly on TV) (1974)
4. Manzel – "Midnight Theme" (1979) (from the Fraternity Records 3745 7-inch single) (1979)
5. Mike Curb Congregation – "Burning Bridges" (from the Kelly's Heroes soundtrack) (1970)
6. Freddie Perren – "Two Pigs and a Hog" (from the Cooley High soundtrack) (1975)
7. The Fatback Band – "Fatbackin'" (from People Music) (1973)
8. Jesse Green – "Flip" (from Flip) (1976)

=== Later volumes ===
Also, two later volumes were released, both as SBR 526. The first version was re-released as Strictly Breaks 1, and the second version was actually mixed and re-edited by Louis Flores.

==== SBR 526 ====
1. Joe Tex – "You Said a Bad Word" (from the Mercury Records 6052156 7-inch single) (1972)
2. Johnnie Taylor – "Ever Ready" (from Ever Ready) (1978)
3. Coalkitchen – "Keep on Pushing" (from Choose Your Flavor) (1977)
4. Graham Central Station – "The Jam" (from Ain't No 'Bout-a-Doubt It) (1975)
5. Trouble Funk – "Let's Get Small" (from the RC-501 12-inch single)
6. Tony Alvon & the Belairs – "Sexy Coffee Pot" (from Atlantic Records 452632 7-inch single) (1969)
7. Hank Carbo – "Hot Pants Pt. 2" (from the A-1172 7-inch single) (1971)

=== Other notes ===
The earliest track on the Ultimate Breaks and Beats series is Joe Tex's "Papa Was Too", released in 1966, with the latest being Fonda Rae's "Touch Me (All Night Long)", released in 1984.

The rarest track to be included on the Ultimate Breaks & Beats series is Manzel's "Midnight Theme", originally released on a Fraternity Records 7-inch record in 1975, though multiple reissues have been released and the song is available on many websites, including YouTube. However, for unknown reasons, the track was the only track left off a CD of all the tracks ever released on the Ultimate Breaks and Beats albums, possibly due to copyright issues.

DJ Superix, a British DJ, is the first DJ known to have compiled every single break from every volume of Ultimate Breaks and Beats into one mix, entitled "Ultimate, Ultimate, Ultimate!", released in 2008. DJs Harry Love and MK originally released a mix CD as a tribute to the series entitled Beats Per Minute. While this CD did not feature every break, it was one of the first in the UK dedicated to be the Ultimate Breaks & Beats series. The first ever DJ mix in tribute to Ultimate Breaks & Beats is DJ Q Bert's Demolition Pumpkin Squeeze Musik (1994). Subtitled as "A Pre-School Break Mix", DJ QBert mixed duplicate copies of UBB tracks with scratching and incorporated dialogue and samples from television, film and popular culture, notably comic books, cartoons and video games.

== Other similar breakbeat compilations ==
Many drum break series compilation albums followed Ultimate Breaks and Beats, including:

- Diggin' (19 volumes)
- Strictly Breaks (11 volumes)
- Dusty Fingers (17 volumes)
- Soul Beats (9 volumes)
- Super Breaks and Beats (8 volumes)
- Argo/Cadet Grooves (7 volumes)
- Drum Crazy (6 volumes)
- Schoolyard Breaks, Rhythm Madness, and Circuit Breaks (all 2 volumes)
- Breaksploitaton (2 volumes)
