= Rungkup =

Political subdivision in Malaysia

Rungkup (N53)
Perak constituency
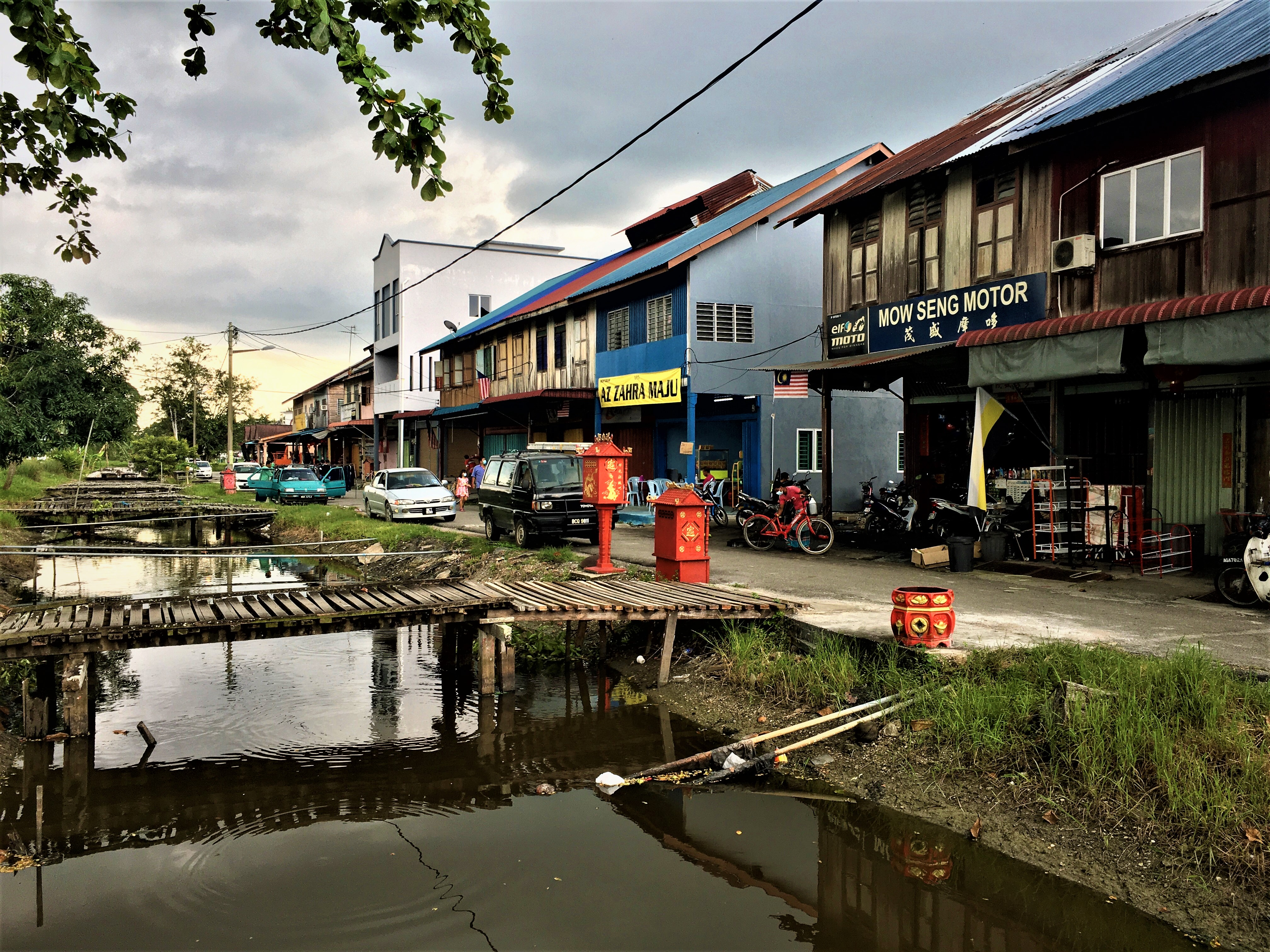
- Image of Simpang Tiga Rungkup

State constituency
- Legislature: Perak State Legislative Assembly
MLA
Shahrul Zaman Yahya
BN
- Constituency created: 1959
- First contested: 1959
- Last contested: 2022

Demographics
- Electors (2022): 19,670

Rungkup is a state constituency in Perak, Malaysia, that has been represented in the Perak State Legislative Assembly.Rungkup is currently located under the Bagan Datuk federal constituency.

== Demographics ==
Ethnic breakdown of Rungkup's electorate as of 2022
1. Malay (67.0%)
2. Chinese (24.1%)
3. Indian (7.80%)
4. Other ethnicities (1.07%)

== History ==
=== Polling districts ===
According to the federal gazette issued on 31 October 2022, the Rungkup constituency is divided into 19 polling districts.

State constituency	Polling Districts	Code	Location
Rungkup (N53）	Melintang Estate	075/53/01	SJK (C) Hua Hsia
Rungkup (N53）	Sungai Pergam	075/53/02	SK Sungai Pergam
Rungkup (N53）	Bagan Datok	075/53/03	SK Bagan Datoh
Rungkup (N53）	Pasang Api	075/53/04	SK Bagan Datoh
Rungkup (N53）	Sungai Balai Baroh	075/53/05	SK Sungai Nipah
Rungkup (N53）	Sungai Betul	075/53/06	SK Sungai Betul
Rungkup (N53）	Rungkup	075/53/07	SK Rungkup
Rungkup (N53）	Sungai Balai Darat	075/53/08	SK Sungai Balai
Rungkup (N53）	Sungai Nipah Darat	075/53/09	Madrasah Manbail Ulum Sungai Nipah Darat
Rungkup (N53）	Simpang Tiga Rungkup	075/53/10	SK Simpang Tiga
Rungkup (N53）	Kuala Perak Estate	075/53/11	SJK (T) Tun Sambanthan
Rungkup (N53）	Tebok Bengkang	075/53/12	SK Sungai Batang
Rungkup (N53）	Sungai Batang	075/53/13	SK Sungai Batang
Rungkup (N53）	Sungai Haji Mohamad	075/53/14	SK Sungai Haji Muhammad
Rungkup (N53）	Selekoh	075/53/15	SK Selekoh
Rungkup (N53）	Sungai Che Maja	075/53/16	SK Sungai Tiang Darat
Rungkup (N53）	Sungai Lancang	075/53/17	SK Rungkup
Rungkup (N53）	Sungai Tiang	075/53/18	SK Sungai Tiang Baroh
Rungkup (N53）	Bagan Sungai Belukang	075/53/19	SJK (C) Yee Hwa

=== Representation history ===
Members of the Legislative Assembly for Rungkup
Assembly	No	Years	Name	Party
Constituency created
1st	N37	1959-1964	Loppe Hashim Ketong	Alliance (UMNO)
2nd	N37	1964-1969	Loppe Hashim Ketong	Alliance (UMNO)
		1969-1971	Assembly dissolved	
3rd	N37	1969-1973	Loppe Hashim Ketong	Alliance (UMNO)
3rd	N37	1973-1974	Loppe Hashim Ketong	BN (UMNO)
4th	N41	1974-1978	Mohamed Yaacob Mohamed	BN (UMNO)
5th	N41	1978-1982	Mohamed Yaacob Mohamed	BN (UMNO)
6th	N41	1982-1983	Mohamed Yaacob Mohamed	BN (UMNO)
6th	N41	1983-1986	Mohamed Jamrah	BN (UMNO)
7th	N41	1986-1990	Yahya Zakaria	BN (UMNO)
8th	N41	1990-1995	Abdullah Ahmad	BN (UMNO)
9th	N47	1995-1999	Abdullah Ahmad	BN (UMNO)
10th	N47	1999-2004	Abdullah Ahmad	BN (UMNO)
11th	N53	2004-2008	Sha'arani Mohamad	BN (UMNO)
12th	N53	2008-2013	Sha'arani Mohamad	BN (UMNO)
13th	N53	2013-2018	Shahrul Zaman Yahya	BN (UMNO)
14th	N53	2018-2022	Shahrul Zaman Yahya	BN (UMNO)
15th	N53	2022–present	Shahrul Zaman Yahya	BN (UMNO)

== Election results ==
Perak state election, 2022: Rungkup
Party	Candidate	Votes	%	∆%
BN	Shahrul Zaman Yahya	7,023	49.55	▼3.02
PH	Ahmad Munzirie Ahmad Khabir	3,614	25.50	▲25.50
PN	Mohd Mohkheri Jalil	3,537	24.95	▲24.95
Total valid votes		14,174	100.00	
Total rejected ballots		247		
Unreturned ballots		22		
Turnout		14,443	73.43	▼5.90
Registered electors		19,670		
Majority		3,409	24.05	▼0.66
BN hold		Swing		

Perak state election, 2018: Rungkup
Party	Candidate	Votes	%	∆%
BN	Shahrul Zaman Yahya	6,529	52.57	▲0.06
PKR	Hatim Musa	3,460	27.86	▲27.86
PAS	Mohd Mukri	2,430	19.57	▼27.92
Total valid votes		12,419	98.44	
Total rejected ballots		281	2.20	
Unreturned ballots		46	0.36	
Turnout		12,746	79.33	▲2.77
Registered electors		16,067		
Majority		3,069	24.71	▲19.69
BN hold		Swing		
Source(s) "RESULTS OF CONTESTED ELECTION AND STATEMENTS OF THE POLL AFTER THE OFFICIAL ADDITION OF VOTES".

Perak state election, 2013: Rungkup
Party	Candidate	Votes	%	∆%
BN	Shahrul Zaman Yahya	6,415	52.51	▲0.12
PAS	Mohd Misbahul Munir Masduki	5,802	47.49	▼0.12
Total valid votes		12,217	97.30	
Total rejected ballots		267	2.13	
Unreturned ballots		72	0.57	
Turnout		12,556	82.10	▲11.24
Registered electors		15,287		
Majority		613	5.02	▲0.24
BN hold		Swing		
Source(s) "KEPUTUSAN PILIHAN RAYA UMUM DEWAN UNDANGAN NEGERI".

Perak state election, 2008: Rungkup
Party	Candidate	Votes	%	∆%
BN	Sha'arani Mohamad	4,984	52.39	▼10.21
PAS	Mohd Misbahul Munir Masduki	4,530	47.61	▲10.21
Total valid votes		9,514	96.51	
Total rejected ballots		314	3.19	
Unreturned ballots		30	0.30	
Turnout		9,858	70.86	▲3.26
Registered electors		13,912		
Majority		454	4.78	▼20.42
BN hold		Swing		
Source(s) "KEPUTUSAN PILIHAN RAYA UMUM DEWAN UNDANGAN NEGERI PERAK BAGI TAHUN 2008".

Perak state election, 2004: Rungkup
Party	Candidate	Votes	%	∆%
BN	Sha'arani Mohamad	5,789	62.60	▲10.52
PAS	Mohd Misbahul Munir Masduki	3,459	37.40	▼10.52
Total valid votes		9,248	96.70	
Total rejected ballots		316	3.30	
Unreturned ballots		0	0.00	
Turnout		9,564	67.60	▲7.47
Registered electors		14,147		
Majority		2,330	25.20	▲21.04
BN hold		Swing		
Source(s) "KEPUTUSAN PILIHAN RAYA UMUM DEWAN UNDANGAN NEGERI PERAK BAGI TAHUN 2004".

Perak state election, 1999: Rungkup
Party	Candidate	Votes	%	∆%
BN	Abdullah Ahmad	4,688	52.08	▼24.77
PAS	Mohd Misbahul Munir Masduki	4,313	47.92	▲24.77
Total valid votes		9,001	96.12	
Total rejected ballots		356	3.80	
Unreturned ballots		7	0.07	
Turnout		9,364	60.13	▼3.11
Registered electors		15,574		
Majority		375	4.16	▼49.54
BN hold		Swing		
Source(s) "KEPUTUSAN PILIHAN RAYA UMUM DEWAN UNDANGAN NEGERI PERAK BAGI TAHUN 1999".

Perak state election, 1995: Rungkup
Party	Candidate	Votes	%	∆%
BN	Abdullah Ahmad	7,073	76.85	▲10.69
PAS	Mohamad Arip Mohd Yasin	2,131	23.15	▼10.69
Total valid votes		9,204	94.79	
Total rejected ballots		482	4.96	
Unreturned ballots		24	0.25	
Turnout		9,710	63.24	▼6.09
Registered electors		15,353		
Majority		4,942	53.70	▲21.38
BN hold		Swing		
Source(s) "KEPUTUSAN PILIHAN RAYA UMUM DEWAN UNDANGAN NEGERI PERAK BAGI TAHUN 1995".

Perak state election, 1990: Rungkup
Party	Candidate	Votes	%	∆%
BN	Abdullah Ahmad	6,762	66.16	▲0.65
S46	Kumar Simin	3,459	33.84	▲33.84
Total valid votes		10,221	95.11	
Total rejected ballots		525	4.89	
Unreturned ballots		0	0.00	
Turnout		10,746	69.33	▲1.89
Registered electors		15,499		
Majority		3,303	32.32	▲0.40
BN hold		Swing		
Source(s) "KEPUTUSAN PILIHAN RAYA UMUM DEWAN UNDANGAN NEGERI PERAK BAGI TAHUN 1990".

Perak state election, 1986: Rungkup
Party	Candidate	Votes	%	∆%
BN	Yahya Zakaria	6,791	65.96	▼0.63
PAS	Mohamad Arif Bakri	3,505	34.04▲0.63	
Total valid votes		11,542	100.00	
Total rejected ballots		333		
Unreturned ballots		0		
Turnout		11,875	65.67	▼8.61
Registered electors		18,084		
Majority		4,134	35.82	▼1.26
BN hold		Swing		
Source(s) "KEPUTUSAN PILIHAN RAYA UMUM DEWAN UNDANGAN NEGERI PERAK BAGI TAHUN 1986".

Perak state election, 1982: Rungkup
Party	Candidate	Votes	%	∆%
BN	Mohamad Yaacob Mohamed	8,867	68.54	▼8.68
PAS	Ahmad Mashud Masduki	4,070	31.46	▲17.85
Total valid votes		12,937	100.00	
Total rejected ballots		435		
Unreturned ballots		0		
Turnout		13,372	74.27	▼2.42
Registered electors		18,004		
Majority		4,797	37.08	▼26.53
BN hold		Swing		

Perak state election, 1978: Rungkup
Party	Candidate	Votes	%	∆%
BN	Mohamad Yaacob Mohamed	9,231	77.22	▼6.25
PAS	Mat Ali Alias	1,627	13.61	▲13.61
DAP	Abdul Karim Zakaria	1,096	9.17	▼2.43
Total valid votes		11,954	100.00	
Total rejected ballots		590		
Unreturned ballots		0		
Turnout		12,544	76.69	▲3.21
Registered electors		16,357		
Majority		7,604	63.61	▼8.26
BN hold		Swing		

Perak state election, 1974: Rungkup
Party	Candidate	Votes	%	∆%
BN	Mohamad Yaacob Mohamed	8,621	83.47	▲83.47
DAP	Abdul Karim Zakaria	1,198	11.60	▲11.60
PEKEMAS	Ibrahim Karim	509	4.93	▲4.93
Total valid votes		10,328	100.00	
Total rejected ballots		1,067		
Unreturned ballots		0		
Turnout		11,395	73.48	▼0.73
Registered electors		15,507		
Majority		7,423	71.87	▲58.11
BN hold		Swing		-

Perak state election, 1969: Rungkup
Party	Candidate	Votes	%	∆%
Alliance	Lope Hashim Ketong	5,249	56.88	▼15.42
PMIP	Ahmad Rosli Abdul Wahab	3,979	43.12	▲15.42
Total valid votes		9,228	100.00	
Total rejected ballots		1,068		
Unreturned ballots		0		
Turnout		10,296	74.22	▼6.21
Registered electors		13,873		
Majority		1,270	13.76	▼30.84
Alliance hold		Swing		

Perak state election, 1964: Rungkup
Party	Candidate	Votes	%	∆%
Alliance	Lope Hashim Ketong	6,696	72.30	▲5.52
PMIP	Hassan Adli Arshad	2,565	27.70	▼5.52
Total valid votes		9,261	100.00	
Total rejected ballots		593		
Unreturned ballots		0		
Turnout		9,854	80.42	▲10.08
Registered electors		12,253		
Majority		4,131	44.61	▲11.05
Alliance hold		Swing		

Perak state election, 1959: Rungkup
Party	Candidate	Votes	%
Alliance	Lope Hashim Ketong	4,901	66.78
PMIP	Ali Akbar Mohd. Amin	2,438	33.22
Total valid votes		7,339	100.00
Total rejected ballots		202	
Unreturned ballots		0	
Turnout		7,541	70.34
Registered electors		10,721	
Majority		2,463	33.56
This was a new constituency created.
