= United People's Party =

United People's Party may refer to:

- United Peoples' Party (Bangladesh)
- United People's Party (Bulgaria)
- Estonian United People's Party, later renamed the Constitution Party
- United Peoples Party (Fiji)
- United People's Party (Jamaica)
- United People's Party (Liberia)
- United People's Party (Malaysia)
  - United Sarawak Party (PSB), a Sarawak-based party rebranded from earlier formed United People's Party (UPP)
  - Malaysian United People's Party (MUPP) or Parti Bersatu Rakyat Malaysia (BERSAMA), a nationwide party
  - Sarawak United Peoples' Party (SUPP), one of the oldest Sarawak-based parties
- United People's Party (Poland)
- United People's Party (Rhodesia)
- United People's Party (Saint Kitts and Nevis)
- United People's Party (Singapore)
- United People's Party (Sint Maarten)
- United People's Party (Zimbabwe)

== See also ==
- UPP (disambiguation)
