= Bagan Datuk (federal constituency) =

Malaysian federal constituency

Bagan Datuk (P075)
Perak constituency

Federal constituency
- Legislature: Dewan Rakyat
- MP: Ahmad Zahid Hamidi; BN
- Constituency created: 1958
- First contested: 1959
- Last contested: 2022

Demographics
- Population (2020): 76,495
- Electors (2022): 58,183
- Area (km²): 635
- Pop. density (per km²): 120.5

Bagan Datuk (formerly Bagan Datok, Bagan Datoh) is a federal constituency in Bagan Datuk District, Perak, Malaysia, that has been represented in the Dewan Rakyat since 1959.

The federal constituency was created from parts of the Telok Anson constituency in the 1958 redistribution and is mandated to return a single member to the Dewan Rakyat under the First-past-the-post voting system.

== Demographics ==
Ethnic breakdown of Bagan Datuk's electorate as of 2022
1. Malay (56.3%)
2. Indian (21.7%)
3. Chinese (20.6%)
4. Other ethnicities (1.40%)

As of 2020, Bagan Datuk has a population of 76,495 people.

Age breakdown of Bagan Datuk's electorate as of 2022
1. 18–20 (4.84%)
2. 21–29 (19.4%)
3. 30–39 (24.2%)
4. 40–49 (17.0%)
5. 50–59 (14.0%)
6. 60–69 (11.3%)
7. 70–79 (6.69%)
8. 80–89 (2.05%)
9. above 90 (0.51%)
Gender breakdown of Bagan Datuk's electorate as of 2022
1. Male (50.4%)
2. Female (49.6%)

== History ==
=== Polling districts ===
According to the federal gazette issued on 31 October 2022, the Bagan Datuk constituency is divided into 41 polling districts.

State constituency	Polling Districts	Code	Location
Rungkup (N53）	Melintang Estate	075/53/01	SJK (C) Hua Hsia
Rungkup (N53）	Sungai Pergam	075/53/02	SK Sungai Pergam
Rungkup (N53）	Bagan Datok	075/53/03	SK Bagan Datoh
Rungkup (N53）	Pasang Api	075/53/04	SK Bagan Datoh
Rungkup (N53）	Sungai Balai Baroh	075/53/05	SK Sungai Nipah
Rungkup (N53）	Sungai Betul	075/53/06	SK Sungai Betul
Rungkup (N53）	Rungkup	075/53/07	SK Rungkup
Rungkup (N53）	Sungai Balai Darat	075/53/08	SK Sungai Balai
Rungkup (N53）	Sungai Nipah Darat	075/53/09	Madrasah Manbail Ulum Sungai Nipah Darat
Rungkup (N53）	Simpang Tiga Rungkup	075/53/10	SK Simpang Tiga
Rungkup (N53）	Kuala Perak Estate	075/53/11	SJK (T) Tun Sambanthan
Rungkup (N53）	Tebok Bengkang	075/53/12	SK Sungai Batang
Rungkup (N53）	Sungai Batang	075/53/13	SK Sungai Batang
Rungkup (N53）	Sungai Haji Mohamad	075/53/14	SK Sungai Haji Muhammad
Rungkup (N53）	Selekoh	075/53/15	SK Selekoh
Rungkup (N53）	Sungai Che Maja	075/53/16	SK Sungai Tiang Darat
Rungkup (N53）	Sungai Lancang	075/53/17	SK Rungkup
Rungkup (N53）	Sungai Tiang	075/53/18	SK Sungai Tiang Baroh
Rungkup (N53）	Bagan Sungai Belukang	075/53/19	SJK (C) Yee Hwa
Hutan Melintang (N54)	Tanah Lalang	075/54/01	SK Tanah Lalang
Hutan Melintang (N54)	Sungai Dulang	075/54/02	SK Sungai Dulang Dalam
Hutan Melintang (N54)	Kampong Sungai Buloh	075/54/03	SK Sungai Buloh
Hutan Melintang (N54)	Simpang Ampat	075/54/04	SK Simpang Empat; SK Tanjong Bayan
Hutan Melintang (N54)	Kampong Baharu Batu 16	075/54/05	SK Kampung Baharu
Hutan Melintang (N54)	Kuala Bernam Estate	075/54/06	SMK Khir Johari
Hutan Melintang (N54)	Batu Dua Puloh	075/54/07	SK Bagan Pasir
Hutan Melintang (N54)	Bagan Pasir	075/54/08	SJK (C) Bagan Pasir Laut
Hutan Melintang (N54)	Parit 4	075/54/09	SMK Khir Johari
Hutan Melintang (N54)	Parit 7	075/54/10	SK Khir Johari
Hutan Melintang (N54)	Sungai Sumun	075/54/11	SK Sungai Sumun
Hutan Melintang (N54)	Parit 13	075/54/12	SJK (T) Ladang Flemington
Hutan Melintang (N54)	Parit 21	075/54/13	SJK (C) Pooi Seng
Hutan Melintang (N54)	Hutan Melintang	075/54/14	SJK (C) Keow Min; SMK Hutan Melintang
Hutan Melintang (N54)	Batu Dua Belas	075/54/15	SK Hutan Melintang
Hutan Melintang (N54)	Jalan Feri	075/54/16	SJK (T) Barathi
Hutan Melintang (N54)	Kampong Baharu Jendarata	075/54/17	SJK (C) Yeong Seng
Hutan Melintang (N54)	Jendarata	075/54/18	SJK (T) Ladang Jendarata 1
Hutan Melintang (N54)	Jenderata Estate Div. 3	075/54/19	SJK (T) Ladang Jenderata Bhg 3
Hutan Melintang (N54)	Kampong Kebun Baru	075/54/20	SMK Seri Perkasa
Hutan Melintang (N54)	Kampong Telok Buloh	075/54/21	SK Teluk Buloh
Hutan Melintang (N54)	Kampong Kota	075/54/22	SK Sungai Keli

=== Representation history ===
Members of Parliament for Bagan Datuk
Parliament	No	Years	Member	Party	Vote Share
Constituency split from Telok Anson
Bagan Datoh
Parliament of the Federation of Malaya
1st	P058	1959–1963	Yahya Ahmad (يحي احمد)	Alliance (UMNO)	8,078; 61.73%
Parliament of Malaysia
1st	P058	1963–1964	Yahya Ahmad (يحي احمد)	Alliance (UMNO)	8,078; 61.73%
2nd	P058	1964–1969	Sulaiman Bulon (سليمان بولون)	Alliance (UMNO)	12,225; 73.84%
		1969–1971	Parliament was suspended		
3rd	P058	1971–1973	Sulaiman Bulon (سليمان بولون)	Alliance (UMNO)	10,204; 60.55%
3rd	P058	1973–1974	Sulaiman Bulon (سليمان بولون)	BN (UMNO)	10,204; 60.55%
Bagan Datok
4th	P064	1974–1978	Hassan Adli Arshad (حسن عدلي ارشد)	BN (PAS)	15,781; 87.73%
5th	P064	1978–1982	Hassan Adli Arshad (حسن عدلي ارشد)	BN (UMNO)	16,894; 76.72%
6th	P064	1982–1986	Yahya Zakaria (يحي زكريا)	BN (UMNO)	16,568; 68.09%
7th	P069	1986–1990	Mohamed Jamrah (محمد جمرح)	BN (UMNO)	14,902; 67.87%
8th	P069	1990–1995	Mohamed Jamrah (محمد جمرح)	BN (UMNO)	15,365; 67.24%
9th	P072	1995–1999	Ahmad Zahid Hamidi (أحمد زاهد حميدي)	BN (UMNO)	17,646; 86.24%
10th	P072	1999–2004	Ahmad Zahid Hamidi (أحمد زاهد حميدي)	BN (UMNO)	12,938; 60.86%
11th	P075	2004–2008	Ahmad Zahid Hamidi (أحمد زاهد حميدي)	BN (UMNO)	17,049; 79.08%
12th	P075	2008–2013	Ahmad Zahid Hamidi (أحمد زاهد حميدي)	BN (UMNO)	13,115; 55.72%
13th	P075	2013–2018	Ahmad Zahid Hamidi (أحمد زاهد حميدي)	BN (UMNO)	17,176; 53.27%
Bagan Datuk
14th	P075	2018–2022	Ahmad Zahid Hamidi (أحمد زاهد حميدي)	BN (UMNO)	18,909; 51.37%
15th	P075	2022–present	Ahmad Zahid Hamidi (أحمد زاهد حميدي)	BN (UMNO)	16,578; 39.61%

=== State constituency ===
Parliamentary constituency	State constituency						
Parliamentary constituency	1955–1959*	1959–1974	1974–1986	1986–1995	1995–2004	2004–2018	2018–present
Bagan Datoh		Rungkup					
Bagan Datoh		Hutan Melintang					
Bagan Datok			Rungkup				
Bagan Datok			Hutan Melintang				
Bagan Datuk							Rungkup
Bagan Datuk							Hutan Melintang

=== Historical boundaries ===
State Constituency	Area					
State Constituency	1959	1974	1984	1994	2003	2018
Hutan Melintang	Hutan Melintang; Kampung Seri Perkasa; Lubuk Banting; Simpang Empat; Sungai Sumun		Hutan Melintang; Kampung Seri Perkasa; Kampung Sungai Keli; Simpang Empat; Sungai Sumun			
Rungkup	Bagan Datuk; Rungkup; Selekoh; Simpang Tiga; Sungai Dulang		Bagan Datuk; Rungkup; Selekoh; Simpang Tiga; Sungai Tiang			

=== Current state assembly members ===
No.	State Constituency	Member	Coalition (Party)
N53	Rungkup	Shahrul Zaman Yahya	BN (UMNO)
N54	Hutan Melintang	Wasanthee Sinnasamy	PH (PKR)

=== Local governments & postcodes ===
No.	State Constituency	Local Government	Postcode
N53	Rungkup	Teluk Intan Municipal Council	36100 Bagan Datuk; 36110 Teluk Intan; 36200 Selekoh; 36300 Sungai Sumun; 36400 Hutan Melintang
N54	Hutan Melintang	Teluk Intan Municipal Council	36100 Bagan Datuk; 36110 Teluk Intan; 36200 Selekoh; 36300 Sungai Sumun; 36400 Hutan Melintang

== Election results ==
Malaysian general election, 2022
Party	Candidate	Votes	%	∆%
BN	Ahmad Zahid Hamidi	16,578	39.61	▼11.76
PH	Shamsul Iskandar Md. Akin	16,230	38.78	▲1.19
PN	Muhammad Faiz Na'aman	8,822	21.08	▲21.08
Independent	Mohamed Tawfik Ismail	226	0.54	▲0.54
Total valid votes		41,856	100.00	
Total rejected ballots		748		
Unreturned ballots		91		
Turnout		42,695	73.40	▼6.49
Registered electors		58,183		
Majority		348	0.83	▼12.95
BN hold		Swing		
Source(s) https://lom.agc.gov.my/ilims/upload/portal/akta/outputp/1753277/PUB610%20PARLIMEN%20PERAK.pdf

Malaysian general election, 2018
Party	Candidate	Votes	%	∆%
BN	Ahmad Zahid Hamidi	18,909	51.37	▼1.90
PH	Pakhrurrazi Arshad	13,836	37.59	▲37.59
PAS	Ata Abdul Muneim Hasan Adli	4,061	11.03	▲11.03
Total valid votes		36,806	100.00	
Total rejected ballots		814		
Unreturned ballots		176		
Turnout		37,796	79.89	▼2.94
Registered electors		47,309		
Majority		5,073	13.78	▲7.24
BN hold		Swing		
Source(s) "His Majesty's Government Gazette - Notice of Contested Election, Parliament for the State of Perak [P.U. (B) 237/2018]" (PDF). Attorney General's Chambers of Malaysia. 3 May 2018. "Federal Government Gazette - Results of Contested Election and Statements of the Poll after the Official Addition of Votes, Parliamentary Constituencies for the State of Perak [P.U. (B) 311/2018]" (PDF). Attorney General's Chambers of Malaysia. 28 May 2018.

Malaysian general election, 2013: Bagan Datok
Party	Candidate	Votes	%	∆%
BN	Ahmad Zahid Hamidi	17,176	53.27	▼2.45
PKR	Madhi Hasan	15,068	46.73	▲2.45
Total valid votes		32,244	100.00	
Total rejected ballots		716		
Unreturned ballots		109		
Turnout		33,069	82.83	▲12.41
Registered electors		39,924		
Majority		2,108	6.54	▼4.90
BN hold		Swing		
Source(s) "Federal Government Gazette - Notice of Contested Election, Parliament for the State of Perak [P.U. (B) 174/2013]" (PDF). Attorney General's Chambers of Malaysia. 26 April 2013. Archived from the original (PDF) on 29 December 2019. "Federal Government Gazette - Results of Contested Election and Statements of the Poll after the Official Addition of Votes, Parliamentary Constituencies for the State of Perak [P.U. (B) 215/2013]" (PDF). Attorney General's Chambers of Malaysia. 22 May 2013.

Malaysian general election, 2008: Bagan Datok
Party	Candidate	Votes	%	∆%
BN	Ahmad Zahid Hamidi	13,115	55.72	▼23.36
PKR	Madhi Hasan	10,423	44.28	▲23.36
Total valid votes		23,538	100.00	
Total rejected ballots		814		
Unreturned ballots		62		
Turnout		24,414	70.42	▲4.04
Registered electors		34,670		
Majority		2,692	11.44	▼46.72
BN hold		Swing		

Malaysian general election, 2004: Bagan Datok
Party	Candidate	Votes	%	∆%
BN	Ahmad Zahid Hamidi	17,049	79.08	▲18.22
PKR	Ayyathurai Achutharaman	4,510	20.92	▼18.22
Total valid votes		21,559	100.00	
Total rejected ballots		1,077		
Unreturned ballots		54		
Turnout		22,690	66.38	▲6.14
Registered electors		34,181		
Majority		12,539	58.16	▲36.40
BN hold		Swing		

Malaysian general election, 1999: Bagan Datok
Party	Candidate	Votes	%	∆%
BN	Ahmad Zahid Hamidi	12,938	60.86	▼25.38
PKR	Mohamad Dahalan Arshad	8,321	39.14	▲39.14
Total valid votes		21,259	100.00	
Total rejected ballots		878		
Unreturned ballots		27		
Turnout		22,164	60.24	▼1.78
Registered electors		36,792		
Majority		4,617	21.72	▼50.76
BN hold		Swing		

Malaysian general election, 1995: Bagan Datok
Party	Candidate	Votes	%	∆%
BN	Ahmad Zahid Hamidi	17,646	86.24	▲19.00
S46	Asha'ri Marsom	2,816	13.76	▲13.76
Total valid votes		20,462	100.00	
Total rejected ballots		1,412		
Unreturned ballots		63		
Turnout		21,937	62.02	▼6.87
Registered electors		35,370		
Majority		14,830	72.48	▲38.00
BN hold		Swing		

Malaysian general election, 1990: Bagan Datok
Party	Candidate	Votes	%	∆%
BN	Mohamed Jamrah	15,365	67.24	▼0.63
PAS	Ariffin Ngah Nasution	7,486	32.76	▲0.63
Total valid votes		22,851	100.00	
Total rejected ballots		1,129		
Unreturned ballots		0		
Turnout		23,980	68.89	▲1.65
Registered electors		34,811		
Majority		7,879	34.48	▼1.26
BN hold		Swing		

Malaysian general election, 1986: Bagan Datok
Party	Candidate	Votes	%	∆%
BN	Mohamed Jamrah	14,902	67.87	▼0.22
PAS	Ariffin Ngah Nasution	7,054	32.13	▲0.22
Total valid votes		21,956	100.00	
Total rejected ballots		882		
Unreturned ballots		0		
Turnout		22,838	67.24	▼5.72
Registered electors		33,965		
Majority		7,848	35.74	▼0.44
BN hold		Swing		

Malaysian general election, 1982: Bagan Datok
Party	Candidate	Votes	%	∆%
BN	Yahya Zakaria	16,568	68.09	▼8.63
PAS	Mohamed Aris Bakri	7,763	31.91	▲20.10
Total valid votes		24,331	100.00	
Total rejected ballots		1,225		
Unreturned ballots		0		
Turnout		25,556	72.96	▼1.38
Registered electors		35,028		
Majority		8,805	36.18	▼28.73
BN hold		Swing		

Malaysian general election, 1978: Bagan Datok
Party	Candidate	Votes	%	∆%
BN	Hassan Adli Arshad	16,894	76.72	▼11.01
PAS	Abdullah Basiran	2,600	11.81	▲11.81
DAP	Thee Ah Pow @ Thee You Min	2,527	11.48	▲11.48
Total valid votes		22,021	100.00	
Total rejected ballots		1,016		
Unreturned ballots		0		
Turnout		23,037	74.34	▲3.11
Registered electors		30,989		
Majority		14,294	64.91	▼10.55
BN hold		Swing		

Malaysian general election, 1974: Bagan Datok
Party	Candidate	Votes	%	∆%
BN	Hassan Adli Arshad	15,781	87.73	▲87.73
PEKEMAS	Ibrahim Karim	2,208	12.27	▲12.27
Total valid votes		17,989	100.00	
Total rejected ballots		1,708		
Unreturned ballots		0		
Turnout		19,697	71.23	▲1.63
Registered electors		27,630		
Majority		13,573	75.46	▲54.36
BN gain from Alliance		Swing		?

Malaysian general election, 1969: Bagan Datoh
Party	Candidate	Votes	%	∆%
Alliance	Sulaiman Bulon	10,204	60.55	▼13.29
PMIP	Mohamad Sayoti Mohamad Elham	6,648	39.45	▲13.29
Total valid votes		16,852	100.00	
Total rejected ballots		1,408		
Unreturned ballots		0		
Turnout		18,260	69.60	▼7.69
Registered electors		26,237		
Majority		3,556	21.10	▼26.58
Alliance hold		Swing		

Malaysian general election, 1964: Bagan Datoh
Party	Candidate	Votes	%	∆%
Alliance	Sulaiman Bulon	12,225	73.84	▲12.11
PMIP	Ibrahim Dahalan	4,331	26.16	▼7.65
Total valid votes		16,556	100.00	
Total rejected ballots		1,039		
Unreturned ballots		0		
Turnout		17,595	77.29	▲6.01
Registered electors		22,766		
Majority		7,894	47.68	▲19.76
Alliance hold		Swing		

Malayan general election, 1959: Bagan Datoh
Party	Candidate	Votes	%
Alliance	Yahya Ahmad	8,078	61.73
PMIP	Azubir Ahmad	4,425	33.81
PPP	Mohamed Yunus Sibi	583	4.46
Total valid votes		13,086	100.00
Total rejected ballots		133	
Unreturned ballots		0	
Turnout		13,219	71.28
Registered electors		18,545	
Majority		3,653	27.92
This was a new constituency created out of Telok Anson which went to Alliance in the previous election.
