= Luis "BreakBeat Lou" Flores =

Luis "BreakBeat Lou" Flores is an American DJ and producer most recognized for creating the Ultimate Breaks and Beats (UBB) compilation series with the late Leonard "BreakBeat Lenny" Roberts. Flores’ work with UBB became the blueprint for sampled music and remains relevant and integral to hip-hop music and culture. The UBB Collection had been crucial in the foundations of various genres of music such as Jungle and Drum & Bass.

== Biography ==
Luis "Breakbeat Lou" Flores was born in Metropolitan Hospital in Manhattan, New York, and the raised in the Bronx, New York. As a young child, Flores was captivated by the music his mother would play in the house on the weekends. When he grew, his older sister took him to his first Hip Hop jam in the Bronx, which inspired Flores to become a DJ in 1974. He was also a dancer and a graffiti writer. When he turned 16 years old, his sister's boyfriend would buy him two turntables and a mixer to start his DJ career. Breakbeat Lou became an example of—and a lifelong advocate for—the role of the DJ in Hip Hop as the keeper of the rhythm for the artform's other elements: breaking, graffiti writing, and MC-ing, in particular.

=== Early career ===
Flores became part of the SOS record pool for DJs around 1980. On one of the weekly pool visits, Flores reconnected with Leonard "Record Lenny" Roberts, and a frequent topic of conversation between the two concerned the fact that, as MCs moved into recording studios of labels such as Sugar Hill Records they were rapping over live studio bands instead of Djs spinning breaks, one of the key foundations of the music. Together, the two of them would embark on a musical journey to produce albums that were instrumental in the formation of the early Hip Hop park jams. The collection, first called the Octopus Breaks then Ultimate Breaks and Beats (UBB) would consist of records that Flores would later call "foundation beats": the records that many of the early hip hop DJs would play at park jams. Lenny and Lou didn't only compile these beats; Lou also created new remixes of the beats, using 2-inch reel-to-reel recording technology to extend the length of breaks for the album.

The UBB series started out with small local distribution in New York City record stores but soon, UBB began circulating across the United States, and eventually, the globe. Lou and Lenny put out 25 volumes between 1986 and 1991 on their label Street Beat Records, eventually totalling around 200 tracks. The breaks on these records would become the foundation for Hip Hop sampling in the mid-to late 1980s, and into the 1990s and 2000s. As a result, the sound of the Hip Hop changed in this era, with more live instruments sampled from recordings and less synthesizers and drum machines.

=== Later career ===
Breakbeat Lou has remained a working DJ throughout his life, developing a vinyl collection of over 100,000 records at its highest point. He has shared the stage with Afrika Bambaataa,Grandwizzard Theodore, Biz Markie, Todd Terry, Rich Medina, Q-Bert, Lord Finesse, Boogie Blind, DJ Scratch and countless others. He plays intimate club venues as well as big outdoor events such as the True School NYC Summer Park Jams in the Bronx, alongside KOOL DJ Red Alert and DJ Jazzy Jay. as well as large festival stages including Soundfest Festival in Minneapolis, MN, Soul Summit in Chicago, and the A3C Conference in Atlanta, GA. Lou has developed a particular specialty of DJ-ing with rare 45 rpm records (also called "singles" or "7-inches").

Most recently, Breakbeat Lou has toured the globe as an international club DJ. In 2015, Breakbeat Lou was the DJ for the opening event of Banksy's sold out "Dismaland" (with DJ Yoda and Mos Def) in 2015. and "Virgin Media's Our House at the V Festival" alongside Mark Ronson, De La Soul, Peanut Butter Wolf and A-Trak. Flores also curated the music for the first annual Level Up Philly Honors in 2024, featuring rapper Slick Rick and honoring newly-elected Philadelphia mayor Cherelle Parker.

Flores has also produced for artists including RA the Rugged Man, David Bars, Kia Leiaina, Nemja Nefertiti. In 2017, Breakbeat Lou became the official DJ for Souls of Mischief (Hieroglyphics Crew), and is currently producing for Hieroglyphics Crew members Opio, Tajai and Casual. In Spring 2026, Flores will be teaching a course on Hip Hop for the UC San Diego Music Department.

== Impact and legacy ==
Roberts and Flores are also responsible for circulating the "Amen Break" from The Winstons' song "Amen Brother" on the first volume of Ultimate Breaks and Beats in 1986. That same year, the sample started appearing in new tracks from Salt n' Pepa ("I Desire") and Steady B ("Stupid Fresh"). It would eventually become one of the most sampled beats in Hip Hop and the foundation of Drum and Bass sampling and production. Producer Dr. Dre and rapper Eazy-E met in a record store in Los Angeles, both looking for a copy of Ultimate Breaks and Beats. They would later sample the "Amen Break" in 1988's "Straight Outta Compton." Breakbeat Lou's particular mix of the "Amen Break" is heard in the sampled version used in "It Takes Two" (1988) by Rob Base & DJ E-Z Rock.

The series has been instrumental in the production of many classic recordings over the years and has been sampled by many Hip-Hop producers such as DJ Premier (Gangstarr), Large Professor, The Bomb Squad (Public Enemy), Pete Rock, Dr. Dre, Marley Marl, and DJ Shadow. Contemporary producers and DJs such as J Dilla, Salaam Remi, Rhettmatic, Mr. Len, Kenny “Dope” Gonzalez and Just Blaze continue to depend on the compilation. In 2014, Breakbeat Lou was invited to participate as an advisor in the Smithsonian Anthology of Hip-Hop and Rap, a collaborative production between the National Museum of African American History and Culture and Smithsonian Folkways Recordings.
