= UPP =

UPP may stand for:

Political parties

- Union for Peru (Unión por el Perú), a liberal or centrist political party in Peru
- Union for Promoting Progress (União Promotora para o Progresso), a political party in Macao
- United People's Party (disambiguation), various parties
- United Progressive Party (disambiguation), various parties
- Unified Progressive Party, a political party in South Korea

Other

- Pacifying Police Unit, policing and law enforcement program in Rio de Janeiro
- Ultimate++, an open source IDE and easy-to-use Widget toolkit
- Ultimate Picture Palace, a cinema in Oxford, England
- United Plankton Pictures, a production company
- Universal Pricing Policy, see Price_discrimination#Universal_pricing
- University Partnership Programme, an accommodation business for students in the UK
- University of Pittsburgh Press
- The IATA code for Upolu Airport in Hawaii
- Uppsala, especially in seismology
- Universal Power Plant, a unitised engine installation devised by Rolls-Royce
- United Plankton Pictures

== See also ==
- Upp (disambiguation)
