= Upp (band) =

British rock-jazz fusion band

Upp was a British rock-jazz fusion band, active in the 1970s. The group was originally going to be called 3 UPP, and consisted of Stephen Amazing (bass guitar), Andy Clark (keyboards) and Jim Copley (drums). David Bunce (guitar) joined on guitar for the second album.

Stephen Amazing, aka Steve Fields prior to his career in Clark Hutchinson in his teenage years, used to play bass guitar in a band called 'The Kinetics', and also, at times, in another band called 'The Abstracts'. Some photographs showing Fields in the Kinetics can be seen at Bill Chewter's Facebook page at .

Jim Copley has spoken of the genesis of the band; "Three months of rehearsing almost everyday, Jeff Beck came down to the studio to play with David Bowie who was doing his Hammersmith Odeon farewell concert in 1973. Jeff was with a friend of my dad’s and he heard the band through the wall and we were doing James Brown and very funky stuff. He kicked the door open and he came in and we stopped 'cause it was Jeff Beck and he said 'please carry on, I love it, I love it!’. The band was heavily influenced by other acts like Otis Redding, Sly & The Family Stone, Stevie Wonder and Donny Hathaway.

The group were signed to CBS in 1974 They also supported Beck, Bogert & Appice at The Rainbow on 26th January 1974. and the debut album, Upp, was released in 1975. Jeff Beck produced and also played guitars on this LP, although there was no mention of him playing in the liner notes. Upp released its next album a year later, titled This Way Upp. Beck again produced this album and played guitar solos on "Dance Your Troubles Away" and "Don't Want Nothing to Change." This album was recorded at CBS Studios, London.

The group backed Beck on the 1970s BBC One special Five Faces of Guitar, which also featured Julian Bream. They played two songs, which were "Get Down in the Dirt" and Beck's arrangement of The Beatles' song "She's a Woman", with an interview about Beck's instrumentation as an intermission between the two.

A BBC radio recording was broadcast on BBC Radio 1 circa 1976.

The group's track "Give It to You" contains one of the popular breakbeats of all time, and is featured in the Ultimate Breaks and Beats series.

Andy Clark died in April 2026.

== Discography ==
- Upp (1975), Epic/CBS Records
- This Way Upp (1976), Epic/CBS Records
- Get Down in the Dirt: The Complete Upp (2005) Castle Music—compilation album
