= Strictly Breaks =

Strictly Breaks is the name of a series of compilation records of songs that are widely admired as break beats. The first volume was released in 1997. Some of the songs featured contain "open breaks" which are solo drum passages which enable DJs to easily transition into them, as well as attractive to producers who loop or rearrange them to create new compositions. Following in the tradition of the Ultimate Breaks and Beats series, the Strictly Breaks records contain an eclectic range of musical styles: mainly funk and jazz, but also including soul, rock, disco and pop. Some of the offerings are well-known (the Psycho theme by Bernard Hermann) but most are relatively obscure tracks treasured by music connoisseurs and DJs. The common, but hard to define thread in all of these songs is that they are "funky". Many of the songs in the Strictly Breaks series have been sampled into new musical compositions, mainly by hip hop producers.

In the early 2000s, Strictly Breaks also released the Tribe Vibes series featuring tracks sampled by A Tribe Called Quest.

== Complete track listings ==
- Strictly Breaks Volume 1
  1. "The Long Wait" – Hawaii Five-O Soundtrack
  2. "You Can't Turn Me Away" – Sylvia Striplin from Give Me Your Love (1981)
  3. "The Smile" – David Axelrod from Song of Innocence (1968)
  4. "Rain Dance" – Jeff Lorber
  5. "Morning" – Cal Tjader from Soul Burst (1966)
  6. "Summer in the City" – Quincy Jones
  7. "Garden Of Peace" – Lonnie Liston Smith from Dreams of Tomorrow (1983)
  8. "I'm Afraid The Masquerade Is Over" – David Porter
  9. "Mask" – Shelly Manne
  10. "Get Out My Life Woman" – Joe Williams
  11. "In The Mood" – Tyrone Davis
  12. "Drums Of Death" – Bonus Beat
- Strictly Breaks Volume 2
  1. "Summer Breeze" – The Main Ingredient
  2. "Adventures In The Land Of Music" – Dynasty
  3. "My Jamaican Guy" – Grace Jones
  4. "Enchanted Lady" – Milt Jackson
  5. "Free Soul" – John Klemmer
  6. "Unwind Yourself" – Marva Whitney
  7. "Quinn the Eskimo (The Mighty Quinn)" – Ramsey Lewis
  8. "EVA" – Jean Jacques Perrey
  9. "Fun" – Brick
  10. "Funky Worm" – Ohio Players
  11. "Night Love" – Jeff Lorber
  12. "Searching" – Roy Ayers
- Strictly Breaks Volume 3
  1. "Sweet Green Fields" – Seals & Crofts
  2. "I Did It For Love" – Love Unlimited Orchestra
  3. "I Put A Spell On You" – Screamin' Jay Hawkins
  4. "Killers Lullaby" – Barry White
  5. "I Hear Music In The Streets" – Unlimited Touch
  6. "Just Kissed My Baby" – The Meters
  7. "Black Cow" – Steely Dan
  8. "Hollywood Swinging" – Kool & The Gang
  9. "She's A Bad Mama Jama" – Carl Carlton
  10. "I'm Coming Out" – Diana Ross
  11. "The Body Rock" – The Treacherous Three
  12. "I'll Never Grow Old – The Charmells
  13. "I Want 2 Do Something Freaky 2 U" – Leon Haywood
  14. "Little Green Apples" – Monk Higgins
- Strictly Breaks Volume 4
  1. Bob James – "Shamboozie"
  2. Labi Siffre – "I Got The Blues"
  3. Buddy Baker – "Sign Song"
  4. Extra T's – "E.T. Boogie"
  5. Les McCann – "Vallarta"
  6. Ann Peebles – "I Can't Stand The Rain"
  7. Rhythm – "The World Is A Place"
  8. Zulema – "American Fruit, African Roots"
  9. Delfonics – "Ready Or Not"
  10. Ahmad Jamal – "Pastures"
  11. Ohio Players – "Little Lady Maria"
  12. Curtis Mayfield – "Tripping Out"
  13. Eddie Harris – "Lovely Is Today"
  14. Jack Bruce – "Born To Be Blue"
  15. Lalo Schifrin – "Danube Incident"
  16. Brother Jack McDuff – "Strolling"
- Strictly Breaks Volume 5
  1. Curtis Mayfield – "Right On For The Darkness"
  2. Cecil Holmes – "Call Me, Come Back Home"
  3. Al Green – "Love and Happiness"
  4. Joe Simon – "Drowning in the Sea of Love"
  5. B.T. Express – "Everything Good To You"
  6. Willie Mitchell – "Groovin'"
  7. Nona Hendryx – "Transformation"
  8. Bill Conti – "Going The Distance"
  9. George Duke – "Reach For It"
  10. Bobby Caldwell – "My Flame"
  11. Cal Tjader – "Django"
  12. Stevie Wonder – "Too High"
  13. Larry Young – "Turn Off The Lights"
  14. Chocolate Milk – "Action Speaks Louder Than Words"
- Strictly Breaks Volume 6
  1. "A Little Bit Of Love" – Brenda Russell
  2. "Light My Fire" – Tammi Lynn
  3. "New Beginning" – Dexter Wansel
  4. "Moses Theme" – Thom Bell
  5. "On Your Face" – Earth, Wind & Fire
  6. "Viellir" – Jacques Brel
  7. "Rolling Stone" – The Troggs
  8. "Once In A Lifetime" – Talking Heads
  9. "I've Got Nothing To Lose But The Blues" – Gwen McCrae
  10. "Free And Easy" – The Dells
  11. "I'm Your Mechanicle Man" – Jerry Butler
  12. "There Was A Time" – The Deefelice Trio
  13. "Black Cream" – Harold Wheeler
- Strictly Breaks Volume 7
  1. "Don't Ask Me" – Ramon Morris
  2. "Midnight Groove" – Love Unlimited Orchestra
  3. "Weak At The Knees" – Steve Arrington
  4. "Don't Let It Go To Your Head" – Jean Carn
  5. "Darling, Darling Baby" – Steve Kahn
  6. "Life Is Just A Moment Pt. 2" – Roy Ayers
  7. "It's The Hard Knock Life" – Annie Soundtrack
  8. "Somethings Got To Give" – Afro-Cuban Band
  9. "Come In Out Of The Rain" – Parliament
  10. "It's Time To Break Down" – The Supremes
  11. "Under The Influence Of Love" – Love Unlimited Orchestra
  12. "My Hero Is A Gun" – Diana Ross
- Strictly Breaks Volume 8
  1. "Hi-Jack" – Enoch Light
  2. "Pigs Go Home" – Ronald Stein
  3. "I Wanna Stay" – Barry White
  4. "Blow Your Head (Undubbed Version)" – Fred Wesley and The J.B.'s
  5. "The Fox" – Don Randi
  6. "The Morning Song" – Les McCann
  7. "Vibrations" – Buster Williams
  8. "The Rub" – George & Gwen McCrae
  9. "Psycho" – Bernard Herrmann
  10. "Love Till Tomorrow" – Pablo Today
  11. "Down Home Girl" – The Coasters
  12. "Big Bad John" – Big John Hamilton
- Strictly Breaks Volume 9
  1. "Cher Chez La Femme (Se Si Bon)" – Dr. Buzzard's Original Savannah Band
  2. "Love For the Sake of Love" – Claudia Barry
  3. "The Edge" – David McCullan
  4. "Esto Es El Guaganco" – Jose Cheo Feliciano
  5. "Notorious" – J. Taylor
  6. "Chicago" – G. Nash
  7. "My Song" – Al Wilson
  8. "Anything" – Lionel Bart
  9. "N.T." – Kool & the Gang
  10. "Monoaurail" – The J.B.'s
  11. "Polarizer" – Joe Thomas
  12. "Nadia's Theme" – Barry De Vorzon
- Strictly Breaks Volume 10
  1. "Haboglabotribin" – Bernard Wright
  2. "'Cause I Need It" – Dorothy Ashby
  3. "Right Place, Wrong Time" – Dr. John
  4. "How to Dance" – The Fatback Band
  5. "The Stripper" – Michael Quatro
  6. "Under the Cherry Moon" – Prince
  7. "I Don't Wanna Go" – Paul Butterfield
  8. "I Don't Know What It Is, But It Sure Is Funky" – Ripple
  9. "Crab Apple" – Idris Muhammad
  10. "Down Home Up's" – John Kasandra
  11. "You're Gettin' a Little Too Smart" – The Detroit Emeralds
  12. "Dominoes" – Donald Byrd
- Strictly Breaks Volume 11
  1. "Oh, Calcutta" – The Meters
  2. "Thunder Kiss" – Toshiyuki Honda
  3. "Rubberband" – The Trammps
  4. "Naked Truth" – Best of Both Worlds
  5. "Sunny" – Boney M.
  6. "Diamonds Are Forever" – Franck Pourcel
  7. "Mandrake" – Gong
  8. "No Money Down" – Jerry Butler
  9. "Tearaway" – John Scott
  10. "Let Me Prove My Love For You" – Main Ingredient
  11. "Movement IV (Encounter" – Mandrill
  12. "Diamonds Are Forever" – Shirley Brown
  13. "Crime of the Century" – Supertramp
  14. "Lovin' You" – Johnny "Guitar" Watson
