= Upp (album) =

Studio album by Upp
- Released: 1975
- Studios: Escape Studios, Kent
- Genres: Jazz Rock, Jazz fusion
- Length: 36:37
- Label: Epic
- Producer: Jeff Beck

Upp is the debut album by British rock/jazz fusion band Upp, released in 1975. The album was recorded at Escape Studios, Kent. The opening track, "Bad Stuff," showcases charismatic guitar playing by Jeff Beck. There is a strong influence of funk music felt in the tracks "Get Down in the Dirt," "Friendly Street," and "Give It to You." Jeff Beck produced and played guitars on this album with no mention of him in the album's liner notes, which met with some controversy. "Give It to You" contains a heavily sampled breakbeat, which is featured in the Ultimate Breaks and Beats series. "Jeff's One" was composed by Jeff Beck and Andy Clark.

== Track listing ==
1. "Bad Stuff" (Clark, Copley, Field)
2. "Friendly Street" (Clark, Copley, Field)
3. "It's a Mystery" (Clark, Copley, Field)
4. "Get Down in the Dirt" (Clark, Copley, Field)
5. "Give It to You" (Clark, Copley, Field)
6. "Jeff's One" (Beck, Clark)
7. "Count to Ten" (Clark, Copley, Field)

== Personnel ==
- Andy Clark - Keyboards (Fender Rhodes Electric Piano, Minimoog Synthesizer, Mellotron, and Hohner Clavinet D6)
- Stephen Amazing - Bass
- Jim Copley - Drums
- Jeff Beck - Guitars

- Arranged by Upp
- Produced by Jeff Beck
