= Wasanthee Sinnasamy =

Malaysian politician

Yang Berhormat Puan Wasanthee Sinnasamy MLA
- வசந்தி சின்னசாமி

Member of the Perak State Legislative Assembly for Hutan Melintang
- Incumbent
- Assumed office 19 November 2022
- Preceded by: Khairuddin Tarmizi (BN–UMNO)
- Majority: 1,130 (2022)

Vice Women Chief of the People's Justice Party Elected (2022–2025), Appointed (since 2025)
- Incumbent
- Assumed office 10 June 2025 Serving with: Rozana Zainal Abidin &; Loh Ker Chean &; Rufinah Pengeran
- Women Chief: Fadhlina Sidek
- In office 17 July 2022 – 23 May 2025 Serving with: June Leow Hsiad Hui &; Sangetha Jayakumar &; Rufinah Pengeran &; Faizah Ariffin
- Women Chief: Fadhlina Sidek
- Succeeded by: Rozana Zainal Abidin

Personal details
- Born: Wasanthee d/o Sinnasamy; 22 June 1967 (age 59)
- Citizenship: Malaysia
- Party: People's Justice Party (PKR)
- Other political affiliations: Pakatan Harapan (PH)
- Children: 3
- Education: University of Malaya; Anglia Ruskin University, Cyberjaya
- Occupation: Politician

Wasanthee d/o Sinnasamy (born 22 June 1967) is a Malaysian politician. She served as the Member of the Perak State Legislative Assembly (MLA) for Hutan Melintang since November 2022. She is a member of People's Justice Party (PKR), a component party of Pakatan Harapan (PH) coalitions.

== Election results ==
Perak State Legislative Assembly
Year	Constituency	Candidate	Votes	Pct	Opponent(s)	Votes	Pct	Ballots cast	Majority	Turnout
2022	N54 Hutan Melintang	Wasanthee Sinnasamy (PKR)	11,924	43.06%	Khairuddin Tarmizi (UMNO)	10,794	38.98%	28,252	1,130	71.91%
2022	N54 Hutan Melintang	Wasanthee Sinnasamy (PKR)	11,924	43.06%	Khairun Nizam Marsom (BERSATU)	4,976	17.97%	28,252	1,130	71.91%
