= Minister of Health (Malaysia) =

Malaysian minister

- Menteri Kesihatan

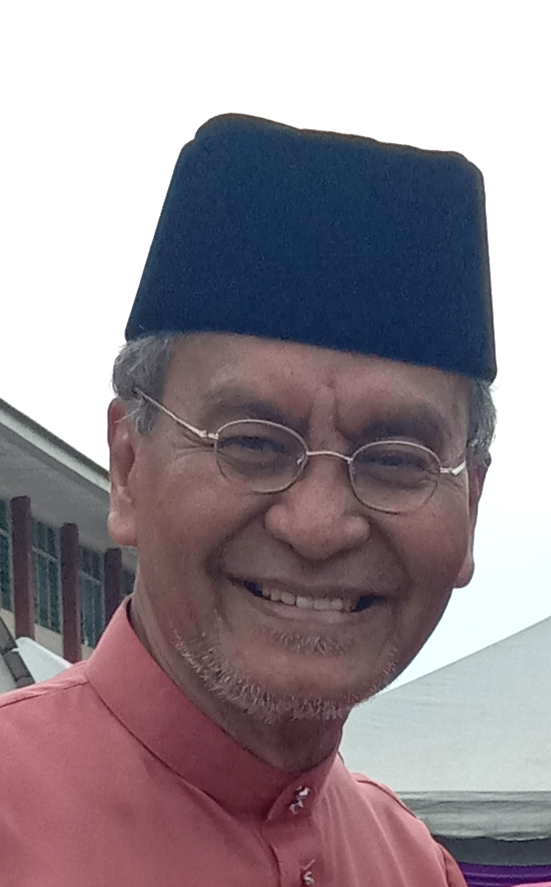
- Incumbent; Dzulkefly Ahmad since 12 December 2023
- Ministry of Health
- Style: Yang Berhormat Menteri (The Honourable Minister)
- Abbreviation: MOH/KKM
- Member of: Cabinet of Malaysia
- Reports to: Parliament of Malaysia
- Seat: Putrajaya
- Appointer: Yang di-Pertuan Agong on the recommendation of the Prime Minister of Malaysia
- Formation: 1955
- First holder: Leong Yew Koh
- Deputy: Hanifah Hajar Taib
- Website: www.moh.gov.my

The Minister of Health (Malay: Menteri Kesihatan; Jawi: منتري كصيحتن) of Malaysia has been Dzulkefly bin Ahmad since 12 December 2023. The minister is supported by Deputy Minister of Health Hanifah Hajar Taib, since 17 December 2025. The Minister administers the portfolio through the Ministry of Health.

== List of ministers of health ==
The following individuals have held office as Minister of Health, or any of its precedent titles:

Political party: Alliance/BN PH

Portrait	Name (Birth–Death) Constituency	Political party	Title	Took office	Left office	Deputy Minister	Prime Minister (Cabinet)
	Leong Yew Koh (1888–1963); MP for Ipoh-Menglembu	Alliance (MCA)	Minister of Health	1955	1956	Vacant	Chief Minister of the Federation of Malaya; Tunku Abdul Rahman (I)
	Leong Yew Koh (1888–1963); MP for Ipoh-Menglembu	Alliance (MCA)	Minister of Health and Social Welfare	1956	31 August 1957	Vacant	Chief Minister of the Federation of Malaya; Tunku Abdul Rahman (I)
	V. T. Sambanthan (1919–1979); MP for Kinta Utara	Alliance (MIC)	Minister of Health	1957	1959	Vacant	Tunku Abdul Rahman (I)
	Omar Ong Yoke Lin (1917–2010); MP for Ulu Selangor	Alliance (MCA)	Minister of Health and Social Welfare	1959	1960	Vacant	Tunku Abdul Rahman (II)
	Abdul Aziz Ishak (1914–1999); MP for Kuala Langat	Alliance (UMNO)	Minister of Health and Social Welfare	1960	1962	Vacant	Tunku Abdul Rahman (II)
	Lim Swee Aun (1915–1977); MP for Larut Selatan	Alliance (MCA)	Minister of Health and Social Welfare	1 August 1962	10 October 1962	Vacant	Tunku Abdul Rahman (II)
	Abdul Rahman Talib (1916–1968); MP for Kuantan	Alliance (UMNO)	Minister of Health	1962	1964	Vacant	Tunku Abdul Rahman (II)
	Bahaman Samsudin (1906–1995); MP for Kuala Pilah	Alliance (UMNO)	Minister of Health	1964	1968	Vacant	Tunku Abdul Rahman (III)
	Abdul Hamid Khan (1900–?); MP for Batang Padang	Alliance (UMNO)	Minister of Health	1968	1969	Vacant	Tunku Abdul Rahman (III)
	Sardon Jubir (1917–1985); MP for Pontian Utara	Alliance (UMNO)	Minister of Health	4 June 1969	1 January 1972	Vacant	Tunku Abdul Rahman (IV); Abdul Razak Hussein (I)
	Lee Siok Yew (1923–2001); MP for Ulu Langat	BN (MCA)	Minister of Health	1972	1978	Vacant (1972–1974); Abu Bakar Umar (1974–1978)	Abdul Razak Hussein (I · II); Hussein Onn (I)
	Chong Hon Nyan (1924–2020); MP for Batu Berendam	BN (MCA)	Minister of Health	1978	2 June 1983	Sulaiman Daud (1978–1981); Vacant (1981); K. Pathmanaban (1981–1982)	Hussein Onn (II); Mahathir Mohamad (I · II)
	Chin Hon Ngian (b. unknown); MP for Renggam	BN (MCA)	Minister of Health	2 June 1983	6 January 1986	K. Pathmanaban	Mahathir Mohamad (II)
	Mak Hon Kam (1939–2015); MP for Tanjong Malim	BN (MCA)	Minister of Health	6 January 1986	10 August 1986	K. Pathmanaban	Mahathir Mohamad (II)
	Chan Siang Sun (b. unknown); MP for Bentong	BN (MCA)	Minister of Health	11 August 1986	21 March 1989	K. Pathmanaban	Mahathir Mohamad (III)
	Ng Cheng Kiat (b. unknown); MP for Klang	BN (MCA)	Minister of Health	15 June 1989	26 October 1990	Mohamed Farid Ariffin	Mahathir Mohamad (III)
	Lee Kim Sai (1937–2019); MP for Hulu Langat	BN (MCA)	Minister of Health	27 October 1990	3 May 1995	Mohamed Farid Ariffin	Mahathir Mohamad (IV)
	Chua Jui Meng (1943–2023); MP for Bakri	BN (MCA)	Minister of Health	8 May 1995	26 March 2004	Siti Zaharah Sulaiman (1995–1996); Mohd Ali Rustam (1996–1999); Suleiman Mohamed (1999–2004)	Mahathir Mohamad (V · VI); Abdullah Ahmad Badawi (I)
	Chua Soi Lek (b. 1947); MP for Labis	BN (MCA)	Minister of Health	27 March 2004	2 January 2008	Abdul Latiff Ahmad	Abdullah Ahmad Badawi (II)
	Ong Ka Ting (b. 1956); MP for Tanjong Piai; Acting	BN (MCA)	Minister of Health	2 January 2008	18 March 2008	Abdul Latiff Ahmad	Abdullah Ahmad Badawi (II)
	Liow Tiong Lai (b. 1961); MP for Bentong	BN (MCA)	Minister of Health	19 March 2008	15 May 2013	Abdul Latiff Ahmad (2008–2009); Rosnah Shirlin (2009–2013)	Abdullah Ahmad Badawi (III); Najib Razak (I)
	Subramaniam Sathasivam (b. 1953); MP for Segamat	BN (MIC)	Minister of Health	16 May 2013	9 May 2018	Hilmi Yahaya	Najib Razak (II)
	Dzulkefly Ahmad (b. 1956); MP for Kuala Selangor	PH (AMANAH)	Minister of Health	21 May 2018	24 February 2020	Lee Boon Chye	Mahathir Mohamad (VII)
	Adham Baba (b.1962); MP for Tenggara	BN (UMNO)	Minister of Health	10 March 2020	16 August 2021	Noor Azmi Ghazali; Aaron Ago Dagang	Muhyiddin Yassin (I)
	Khairy Jamaluddin (b. 1976); MP for Rembau	BN (UMNO)	Minister of Health	30 August 2021	24 November 2022	Noor Azmi Ghazali; Aaron Ago Dagang	Ismail Sabri Yaakob (I)
	Zaliha Mustafa (b. 1964); MP for Sekijang	PH (PKR)	Minister of Health	3 December 2022	12 December 2023	Lukanisman Awang Sauni	Anwar Ibrahim (I)
	Dzulkefly Ahmad (b. 1956); MP for Kuala Selangor	PH (AMANAH)	Minister of Health	12 December 2023	Incumbent	Lukanisman Awang Sauni (2023–2025); Hanifah Hajar Taib (2025–present)	Anwar Ibrahim (I)
