= Deputy Minister of Domestic Trade and Costs of Living (Malaysia) =

Malaysia government deputy minister

- Timbalan Menteri Perdagangan Dalam Negeri dan Kos Sara Hidup
- Coat of Arms of Government of Malaysia
- Incumbent; Fuziah Salleh since 10 December 2022
- Ministry of Domestic Trade and Costs of Living
- Style: Deputy Minister of Domestic Trade and Costs of Living (informal); Yang Berhormat; The Honourable (within Malaysia)
- Reports to: Prime Minister of Malaysia; Minister of Domestic Trade and Costs of Living
- Seat: Putrajaya, Malaysia
- Nominator: Prime Minister of Malaysia
- Appointer: The Yang di-Pertuan Agong on advice of the Prime Minister
- Term length: No fixed term
- Precursor: Deputy Minister of Trade and Industry
- Formation: 27 October 1990
- First holder: Cheah Theam Swee as Assistant Minister of Commerce and Industry
- Salary: RM9,763.20 per month
- Website: www.kpdnkk.gov.my

The Deputy Minister of Domestic Trade and Costs of Living is a non-Malaysian cabinet position serving as deputy head of the Ministry of Domestic Trade and Costs of Living.

The Ministry of Domestic Trade and Consumerism was created in 1990 as a reconstruction of the Ministry of Trade and Industry. International trade functions were eventually transferred to the Ministry of International Trade and Industry, leaving the International Trade Ministry in charge of Industry proper. In 2022, Ministry of Domestic Trade and Consumerism was renamed to Ministry of Domestic Trade and Costs of Living.

== List of deputy ministers ==
The following individuals have been appointed as Deputy Minister of Domestic Trade, or any of its precedent titles:

Colour key (for political coalition/parties):

Coalition	Member party	Timeline
Alliance Party	Malaysian Chinese Association (MCA)	1957–1973
Alliance Party	Malaysian Indian Congress (MIC)	1957–1973
Alliance Party	United Malays National Organisation (UMNO)	1957–1973
–	Sarawak Bumiputera Party (BUMIPUTERA)	–
Barisan Nasional (BN)	Malaysian Chinese Association (MCA)	1973–present
Barisan Nasional (BN)	Malaysian Indian Congress (MIC)	1973–present
Barisan Nasional (BN)	Malaysian People's Movement Party (Gerakan)	1973–2018
Barisan Nasional (BN)	Sarawak Progressive Democratic Party (SPDP)	2002–2018
Barisan Nasional (BN)	United Bumiputera Heritage Party (PBB)	1973–2018
Barisan Nasional (BN)	United Malays National Organisation (UMNO)	1973–present
Pakatan Harapan (PH)	Democratic Action Party (DAP)	2015–2020
Perikatan Nasional (PN)	Malaysian United Indigenous Party (BERSATU)	2020–present

=== Assistant Minister of Commerce and Industry (1959–1972) ===
Portrait	Name (Birth–Death) Constituency	Political coalition	Political party	Took office	Left office	Prime Minister (Cabinet)
	Cheah Theam Swee (b. 19??); MP for Bukit Bintang	Alliance	MCA	1959	1962	Tunku Abdul Rahman (II)
	Abdul Khalid Awang Osman (b. 1925); MP for Kota Star Utara	Alliance	UMNO	1962	1968	Tunku Abdul Rahman (II · III)
	Abdul Taib Mahmud (b. 1936); MP for Samarahan	–	BUMIPUTERA	1968	1970	Tunku Abdul Rahman (III · IV)
=== Deputy Minister of Trade and Industry (1972–1990) ===
Portrait	Name (Birth–Death) Constituency	Political coalition	Political party	Took office	Left office	Prime Minister (Cabinet)
	Musa Hitam (b. 1934); MP for Labis	BN	UMNO	1974	1978	Abdul Razak Hussein (II); Hussein Onn (I)
	Mohamed Rahmat (b. 1938); MP for Pulai	BN	UMNO	15 March 1976	1 January 1978	Hussein Onn (I)
	Abdul Manan Othman (b. 1935); MP for Kuala Trengganu	BN	UMNO	1 January 1978	28 July 1978	Hussein Onn (II)
	Lew Sip Hon (b. 1925); MP for Shah Alam	BN	MCA	1 January 1978	1 June 1983	Hussein Onn (II); Mahathir Mohamad (I · II)
	Shahrir Abdul Samad (b. 1949); MP for Johore Bahru	BN	UMNO	18 July 1981	1 June 1983	Mahathir Mohamad (I · II)
	Oo Gin Sun (b. 1933); MP for Alor Setar	BN	MCA	2 June 1983	6 January 1986	Mahathir Mohamad (II)
	Muhyiddin Muhammad Yassin (b. 1947); MP for Pagoh	BN	UMNO	2 June 1983	10 August 1986	Mahathir Mohamad (II)
	Kee Yong Wee (b. 1936); Senator	BN	MCA	7 January 1986	22 July 1986	Mahathir Mohamad (II)
	Kok Wee Kiat (b. 19??); MP for Selandar	BN	MCA	11 August 1986	20 October 1990	Mahathir Mohamad (III)
Post split into Deputy Minister of Domestic Trade and Consumerism and Deputy Minister of International Trade and Industry effective 27 October 1990.
=== Deputy Minister of Domestic Trade and Consumerism (1990–2009) ===
Portrait	Name (Birth–Death) Constituency	Political coalition	Political party	Took office	Left office	Prime Minister (Cabinet)
	Abdul Kadir Sheikh Fadzir (b. 1939); MP for Kulim-Bandar Baharu	BN	UMNO	27 October 1990	3 May 1995	Mahathir Mohamad (IV)
	Subramaniam Sinniah (b. 1944); MP for Segamat	BN	MIC	4 May 1995	26 March 2004	Mahathir Mohamad (V · VI); Abdullah Ahmad Badawi (I)
	Veerasingam Suppiah (b. 19??); MP for Tapah	BN	MIC	27 March 2004	18 March 2008	Abdullah Ahmad Badawi (II)
	Jelaing Mersat (b. 1948); MP for Saratok	BN	SDPD	19 March 2008	9 April 2009	Abdullah Ahmad Badawi (III)
=== Deputy Minister of Domestic Trade, Co-operatives and Consumerism (2009–2018) ===
Portrait	Name (Birth–Death) Constituency	Political coalition	Political party	Took office	Left office	Prime Minister (Cabinet)
	Tan Lian Hoe (b. 1958); MP for Gerik	BN	Gerakan	10 May 2009	15 May 2013	Mohammad Najib Abdul Razak (I)
	Rohani Abdul Karim (b. 1955); MP for Batang Lupar	BN	PBB	4 June 2010	15 May 2013	Mohammad Najib Abdul Razak (I)
	Ahmad Bashah Md Hanipah (b. 1950); Senator	BN	UMNO	16 May 2013	3 February 2016	Mohammad Najib Abdul Razak (II)
	Henry Sum Agong (b. 1946); MP for Lawas	BN	PBB	27 June 2016	10 May 2018	Mohammad Najib Abdul Razak (II)
=== Deputy Minister of Domestic Trade and Consumer Affairs (2018–2022) ===
Portrait	Name (Birth–Death) Constituency	Political coalition	Political party	Took office	Left office	Prime Minister (Cabinet)
	Chong Chieng Jen (b. 1971); MP for Stampin	PH	DAP	2 July 2018	24 February 2020	Mahathir Mohamad (VII)
	Rosol Wahid (b. 1964); MP for Hulu Terengganu	PN	BERSATU	10 March 2020	24 November 2022	Muhyiddin Yassin (I); Ismail Sabri Yaakob (I)
=== Deputy Minister of Domestic Trade and Costs of Living (2022–present) ===
Portrait	Name (Birth–Death) Constituency	Political coalition	Political party	Took office	Left office	Prime Minister (Cabinet)
	Fuziah Salleh (b. 1959); Senator	PH	PKR	10 December 2022	Incumbent	Anwar Ibrahim (I)

== See also ==
- Minister of Domestic Trade and Costs of Living (Malaysia)
- Minister of International Trade and Industry (Malaysia)
- Deputy Minister of International Trade and Industry (Malaysia)
