= Deputy Minister of Investment, Trade and Industry (Malaysia) =

Malaysia government deputy minister

- Timbalan Menteri Pelaburan, Perdagangan dan Industri
- Coat of Arms of Government of Malaysia
- Incumbent; Sim Tze Tzin since 17 December 2025
- Minister of Investment, Trade and Industry
- Style: Investment, Trade and Industry Deputy Minister (informal); Yang Berhormat; The Honourable (within Malaysia)
- Reports to: Prime Minister of Malaysia; Minister of International Trade and Industry of Malaysia
- Seat: Putrajaya, Malaysia
- Nominator: Prime Minister of Malaysia
- Appointer: The Yang di-Pertuan Agong; on advice of the Prime Minister
- Term length: No fixed term
- Precursor: Deputy Minister of Trade and Industry
- Formation: 27 October 1990
- First holder: Cheah Theam Swee as Assistant Minister of Commerce and Industry
- Salary: RM9,763.20 per month
- Website: www.miti.gov.my

The Deputy Minister of Investment, Trade and Industry is a Malaysian cabinet position serving as deputy head of the Ministry of Investment, Trade and Industry.

The Ministry of International Trade and Industry was created in 1990 as a reconstruction of the Ministry of Trade and Industry. Domestic trade functions were eventually transferred to the Ministry of Domestic Trade and Consumerism, leaving the International Trade Ministry in charge of Industry proper. The post of Deputy Minister of International Trade and Industry was rebranded into Deputy Minister of Investment, Trade and Industry following a cabinet decision on 5 April 2023.

== List of deputy ministers ==
The following individuals have been appointed as Deputy Minister of Investment, Trade and Industry, or any of its precedent titles:

Colour key (for political coalition/parties):

| Coalition | Member party | Timeline |
|---|---|---|
| Alliance Party | Malaysian Chinese Association (MCA) | 1957–1973 |
| Alliance Party | United Malays National Organisation (UMNO) | 1957–1973 |
| – | Sarawak Bumiputera Party (BUMIPUTERA) | – |
| Barisan Nasional (BN) | Liberal Democratic Party (LDP) | 1991–2018 |
| Barisan Nasional (BN) | Malaysian Chinese Association (MCA) | 1973–present |
| Barisan Nasional (BN) | Parti Gerakan Rakyat Malaysia (Gerakan) | 1973–2018 |
| Barisan Nasional (BN) | Sarawak Progressive Democratic Party (SPDP) | 2002–2018 |
| Barisan Nasional (BN) | United Malays National Organisation (UMNO) | 1973–present |
| Pakatan Harapan (PH) | Democratic Action Party (DAP) | 2015–present |
| Pakatan Harapan (PH) | People's Justice Party (PKR) | 2015–present |

=== Assistant Minister of Commerce and Industry (1959–1972) ===
| Portrait | Name (Birth–Death) Constituency | Political coalition | Political party | Took office | Left office | Prime Minister (Cabinet) |
|---|---|---|---|---|---|---|
| | Cheah Theam Swee (b. 19??); MP for Bukit Bintang | Alliance | MCA | 1959 | 1962 | Tunku Abdul Rahman (II) |
| | Abdul Khalid Awang Osman (b. 1925); MP for Kota Star Utara | Alliance | UMNO | 1962 | 1968 | Tunku Abdul Rahman (II · III) |
| | Abdul Taib Mahmud (b. 1936); MP for Samarahan | – | BUMIPUTERA | 1968 | 1970 | Tunku Abdul Rahman (III · IV) |
=== Deputy Minister of Trade and Industry (1972–1990) ===
| Portrait | Name (Birth–Death) Constituency | Political coalition | Political party | Took office | Left office | Prime Minister (Cabinet) |
| | Musa Hitam (b. 1934); MP for Labis | BN | UMNO | 1974 | 1978 | Abdul Razak Hussein (II); Hussein Onn (I) |
| | Mohamed Rahmat (b. 1938); MP for Pulai | BN | UMNO | 15 March 1976 | 1 January 1978 | Hussein Onn (I) |
| | Abdul Manan Othman (b. 1935); MP for Kuala Trengganu | BN | UMNO | 1 January 1978 | 28 July 1978 | Hussein Onn (II) |
| | Lew Sip Hon (1925–2016); MP for Shah Alam | BN | MCA | 1 January 1978 | 1 June 1983 | Hussein Onn (II); Mahathir Mohamad (I · II) |
| | Shahrir Abdul Samad (b. 1949); MP for Johore Bahru | BN | UMNO | 18 July 1981 | 1 June 1983 | Mahathir Mohamad (I · II) |
| | Oo Gin Sun (b. 1933); MP for Alor Setar | BN | MCA | 2 June 1983 | 6 January 1986 | Mahathir Mohamad (II) |
| | Muhyiddin Yassin (b. 1947); MP for Pagoh | BN | UMNO | 2 June 1983 | 10 August 1986 | Mahathir Mohamad (II) |
| | Kee Yong Wee (b. 1936); Senator | BN | MCA | 7 January 1986 | 22 July 1986 | Mahathir Mohamad (II) |
| | Kok Wee Kiat (b. 19??); MP for Selandar | BN | MCA | 11 August 1986 | 20 October 1990 | Mahathir Mohamad (III) |
Post split into Deputy Minister of Domestic Trade and Consumerism and Deputy Minister of International Trade and Industry effective 27 October 1990.
=== Deputy Minister of International Trade and Industry (1990–2023) ===
| Portrait | Name (Birth–Death) Constituency | Political coalition | Political party | Took office | Left office | Prime Minister (Cabinet) |
| | Chua Jui Meng (1943–2023); MP for Bakri | BN | MCA | 27 October 1990 | 7 May 1995 | Mahathir Mohamad (IV) |
| | Kerk Choo Ting (1941–2018); MP for Taiping | BN | Gerakan | 8 May 1995 | 26 March 2004 | Mahathir Mohamad (V · VI); Abdullah Ahmad Badawi (I) |
| | Ahmad Husni Mohamad Hanadzlah (b. 1952); MP for Tambun | BN | UMNO | 27 March 2004 | 18 March 2008 | Abdullah Ahmad Badawi (II) |
| | Mah Siew Keong (b. 1961); MP for Teluk Intan | BN | Gerakan | 27 March 2004 | 14 February 2006 | Abdullah Ahmad Badawi (II) |
| | Ng Lip Yong (b. 1950); MP for Batu | BN | Gerakan | 14 February 2006 | 18 March 2008 | Abdullah Ahmad Badawi (II) |
| | Liew Vui Keong (1960-2020); MP for Sandakan | BN | LDP | 18 March 2008 | 9 April 2009 | Abdullah Ahmad Badawi (III) |
| | Jacob Dungau Sagan (b. 1946); MP for Baram | BN | SPDP | 18 March 2008 | 30 April 2013 | Abdullah Ahmad Badawi (III) |
| | Mukhriz Mahathir (b. 1964); MP for Jerlun | BN | UMNO | 10 April 2009 | 30 April 2013 | Mohammad Najib Abdul Razak (I) |
| | Ir. Dr. Hamim Samuri (b. 1958); MP for Ledang | BN | UMNO | 15 May 2013 | 28 July 2015 | Mohammad Najib Abdul Razak (II) |
| | Lee Chee Leong (b. 1957); MP for Kampar | BN | MCA | 1 July 2014 | 27 June 2016 | Mohammad Najib Abdul Razak (II) |
| | Ahmad Maslan (b. 1966); MP for Pontian | BN | UMNO | 29 July 2015 | 9 May 2018 | Mohammad Najib Abdul Razak (II) |
| | Chua Tee Yong (b. 1977); MP for Labis | BN | MCA | 27 June 2016 | 9 May 2018 | Mohammad Najib Abdul Razak (II) |
| | Dr. Ong Kian Ming (b. 1975); MP for Bangi | PH | DAP | 2 July 2018 | 24 February 2020 | Mahathir Mohamad (VII) |
| | Lim Ban Hong (b. 1977); Senator | BN | MCA | 10 March 2020 | 24 November 2022 | Muhyiddin Yassin (I); Ismail Sabri Yaakob (I) |
| | Liew Chin Tong (b. 1977); MP for Iskandar Puteri | PH | DAP | 10 December 2022 | 5 April 2023 | Anwar Ibrahim (I) |
Post rebranded into Deputy Minister of Investment, Trade and Industry
=== Deputy Minister of Investment, Trade and Industry (2023–present) ===
| Portrait | Name (Birth–Death) Constituency | Political coalition | Political party | Took office | Left office | Prime Minister (Cabinet) |
| | Liew Chin Tong (b.1977); MP for Iskandar Puteri | PH | DAP | 5 April 2023 | 17 December 2025 | Anwar Ibrahim (I) |
| | Sim Tze Tzin (b.1976); MP for Bayan Baru | PH | PKR | 17 December 2025 | Incumbent | Anwar Ibrahim (I) |

== See also ==
- Minister of Investment, Trade and Industry (Malaysia)
- Minister of Domestic Trade and Living Costs (Malaysia)
- Deputy Minister of Domestic Trade and Living Costs (Malaysia)
