= Minister of Education (Malaysia) =

Position in the Malaysian government

- Menteri Pendidikan منتري ڤنديديقن

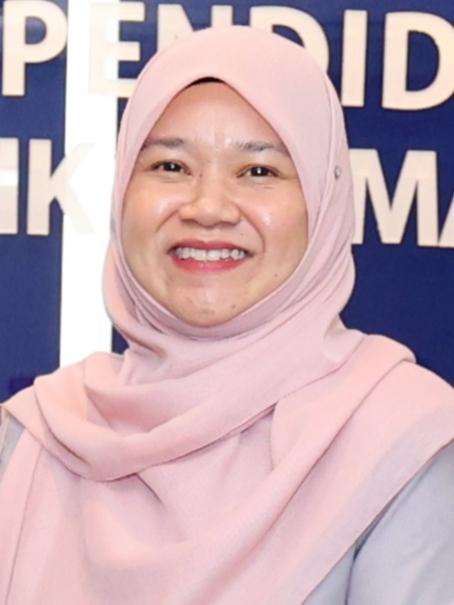
- Incumbent; Fadhlina Sidek since 3 December 2022
- Ministry of Education
- Style: Yang Berhormat Menteri (The Honourable Minister)
- Abbreviation: KPM/MOE
- Member of: Cabinet of Malaysia
- Reports to: Parliament of Malaysia
- Seat: Putrajaya
- Appointer: Yang di-Pertuan Agong on the recommendation of the Prime Minister of Malaysia
- Formation: 1955
- First holder: Abdul Razak Hussein
- Deputy: Wong Kah Woh
- Website: www.moe.gov.my

The current Malaysian Minister of Education (Malay: Menteri Pendidikan; Jawi: منتري ڤنديديقن) is Fadhlina Sidek since 3 December 2022. The minister is supported by the Deputy Ministers of Education. The minister administers the portfolio through the Ministry of Education.

== Political significance ==
Historically, the position of Minister of Education is considered a stepping stone for future Malaysian prime ministers. All Malaysian prime ministers to date have held this position in their career except the first and ninth prime minister, Tunku Abdul Rahman and Ismail Sabri Yaakob.

== List of ministers of education ==
The following individuals have been appointed Minister of Education, or any of its precedent titles:

Political party: Alliance/BN PH PN

Portrait	Name (Birth–Death) Constituency	Political party	Title	Took office	Left office	Deputy Minister	Prime Minister (Cabinet)
	Abdul Razak Hussein (1922–1976); MP for Semantan	Alliance (UMNO)	Minister of Education	1952	1957	Vacant (1952–1955); Too Joon Hing (1955–1957)	Chief Minister of the Federation of Malaya; Tunku Abdul Rahman (I)
	Mohamed Khir Johari (1923–2006); MP for Kedah Tengah	Alliance (UMNO)	Minister of Education	1957	1960	Vacant	Tunku Abdul Rahman (I • II)
	Abdul Rahman Talib (1916–1968); MP for Kuantan	Alliance (UMNO)	Minister of Education	1960	1962	Vacant	Tunku Abdul Rahman (II)
	Abdul Hamid Khan (1900–1974); MP for Batang Padang	Alliance (UMNO)	Minister of Education	1962	1964	Vacant	Tunku Abdul Rahman (II)
	Abdul Rahman Talib (1916–1968); MP for Kuantan	Alliance (UMNO)	Minister of Education	1964	1965	Vacant	Tunku Abdul Rahman (III)
	Mohamed Khir Johari (1923–2006); MP for Kedah Tengah	Alliance (UMNO)	Minister of Education	1965	1969	Vacant	Tunku Abdul Rahman (III)
	Abdul Rahman Ya'kub (1928–2015); MP for Payang	Alliance (BUMIPUTERA)	Minister of Education	1969	1970	Vacant	Tunku Abdul Rahman (IV)
	Hussein Onn (1922–1990); MP for Johore Bahru Timor	Alliance (UMNO)	Minister of Education	1970	1973	Vacant	Abdul Razak Hussein (I)
	Mohamed Yaacob (1926–2009); MP for Tanah Merah	Alliance (UMNO)	Minister of Education	13 August 1973	4 September 1974	Vacant	Abdul Razak Hussein (I)
	Mahathir Mohamad (b.1925) (Deputy Prime Minister); MP for Kubang Pasu	BN (UMNO)	Minister of Education	5 September 1974	1 January 1978	Chan Siang Sun	Abdul Razak Hussein (II); Hussein Onn (I)
	Musa Hitam (b.1934); MP for Labis	BN (UMNO)	Minister of Education	1 January 1978	16 July 1981	Salleh Jaffarudin	Hussein Onn (II)
	Sulaiman Daud (1933–2010); MP for Santubong	BN (PBB)	Minister of Education	17 July 1981	17 July 1984	Chan Siang Sun (1981–1982); Suhaimi Kamaruddin (1981–1982); Tan Tiong Hong (1982–1984); Mohd Khalil Yaakob (1982–1984)	Mahathir Mohamad (I • II)
	Abdullah Ahmad Badawi (1939–2025); MP for Kepala Batas	BN (UMNO)	Minister of Education	17 July 1984	10 August 1986	Rosemary Chow Poh Kheng (1984–1985); Bujang Ulis (1984–1986); Ling Liong Sik (1985–1986); Ng Cheng Kiat (1986)	Mahathir Mohamad (II)
	Anwar Ibrahim (b. 1947); MP for Permatang Pauh	BN (UMNO)	Minister of Education	11 August 1986	15 March 1991	Woon See Chin (1986–1990); Bujang Ulis (1986–1987); Leo Michael Toyad (1987–1991); Ng Cheng Kiat (1986); Fong Chan Onn (1990–1991)	Mahathir Mohamad (III • IV)
	Sulaiman Daud (1933–2010); MP for Petra Jaya	BN (PBB)	Minister of Education	15 March 1991	7 May 1995	Leo Michael Toyad; Fong Chan Onn	Mahathir Mohamad (IV)
	Mohd. Najib Abdul Razak (b. 1953); MP for Pekan	BN (UMNO)	Minister of Education	8 May 1995	14 December 1999	Mohd Khalid Mohd Yunos; Fong Chan Onn	Mahathir Mohamad (V)
	Musa Mohamad (1943–2024); Senator	BN (UMNO)	Minister of Education	15 December 1999	26 March 2004	Abdul Aziz Shamsuddin; Han Choon Kim	Mahathir Mohamad (VI); Abdullah Ahmad Badawi (I)
	Hishammuddin Hussein (b. 1961); MP for Sembrong	BN (UMNO)	Minister of Education	27 March 2004	9 April 2009	Mahadzir Mohd Khir (2004–2006); Han Choon Kim (2004–2008); Noh Omar (2006–2008); Razali Ibrahim (2008–2009); Wee Ka Siong (2008–2009)	Abdullah Ahmad Badawi (II • III)
	Muhyiddin Yassin (b. 1947); MP for Pagoh	BN (UMNO)	Minister of Education	10 April 2009	28 July 2015	Mohd Puad Zarkashi (2009–2013); Wee Ka Siong (2009–2013); Kamalanathan Panchanathan (2013–2015); Mary Yap (2013–2015)	Mohd. Najib Abdul Razak (I • II)
	Idris Jusoh (b. 1955); MP for Besut	BN (UMNO)	Second Minister of Education	16 May 2013	29 July 2015	Kamalanathan Panchanathan; Mary Yap	Najib Razak (II)
	Mahdzir Khalid (b. 1960); MP for Padang Terap	BN (UMNO)	Minister of Education	29 July 2015	9 May 2018	Kamalanathan Panchanathan; Chong Sin Woon	Najib Razak (II)
	Dr. Maszlee Malik (b. 1974); MP for Simpang Renggam	PH (BERSATU)	Minister of Education	21 May 2018	3 January 2020	Teo Nie Ching	Mahathir Mohamad (VII)
	Mahathir Mohamad (b.1925) (Prime Minister); MP for Langkawi; Acting	PH (BERSATU)	Acting Minister of Education	3 January 2020	24 February 2020	Teo Nie Ching	Mahathir Mohamad (VII)
	Dr. Mohd Radzi Md Jidin (b.1977) (Senior Minister); Senator	PN (BERSATU)	Senior Minister of Education	10 March 2020	24 November 2022	Muslimin Yahaya (2020–2021); Mah Hang Soon (2020–2022); Mohamad Alamin (2021–2022)	Muhyiddin Yassin (I); Ismail Sabri Yaakob (I)
	Fadhlina Sidek (b. 1977); MP for Nibong Tebal	PH (PKR)	Minister of Education	3 December 2022	Incumbent	Lim Hui Ying (2022–2023); Wong Kah Woh (2023–current)	Anwar Ibrahim (I)
