= Second Rahman cabinet =

- 2nd Cabinet of Malaya/Malaysia

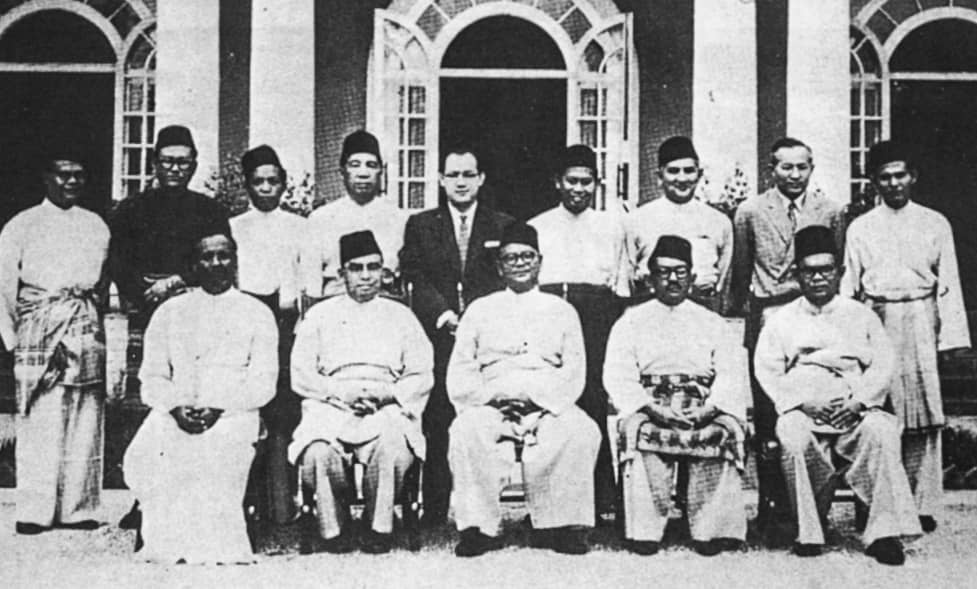
- Prime minister Tunku Abdul Rahman (sitting in centre) with the newly-elected cabinet, c. August 1959.

People and organisations
- Head of state: Tuanku Abdul Rahman (1959–1960); Tuanku Hisamuddin Alam Shah (1960); Tuanku Syed Putra (1960–1964)
- Head of government: Tunku Abdul Rahman
- Deputy head of government: Abdul Razak Hussein
- Member parties: Alliance Party: United Malays National Organisation; Malayan Chinese Association; Malayan Indian Congress
- Status in legislature: Coalition government
- Opposition parties: Pan-Malayan Islamic Party; People's Progressive Party; Labour Party of Malaya; Parti Rakyat Malaysia; Parti Negara; Malayan Party
- Opposition leaders: Burhanuddin al-Helmy (1959–1964); Tan Chee Khoon (1964)

History
- Election: 1959 Malayan general election
- Outgoing election: 1964 Malaysian general election
- Legislature term: 1st Malayan Parliament
- Budgets: 1960, 1961, 1962, 1963, 1964
- Predecessor: First Rahman cabinet
- Successor: Third Rahman cabinet

Tunku Abdul Rahman formed the second Rahman cabinet after being invited by Tuanku Abdul Rahman to begin a new government following the 19 August 1959 general election in the Federation of Malaya. Prior to the election, Rahman led (as Prime Minister) the first Rahman cabinet, a coalition government that consisted of members of the component parties of Alliance Party. It was the 2nd cabinet of Malaysia formed since independence.

The cabinet was sworn in on 22 August 1959 and Rahman assumed the office of Prime Minister from Abdul Razak Hussein who was the Acting Prime Minister after Rahman took a three-month leave of office to campaign for the elections.

All federal ministers from the First Rahman cabinet were retained with the exception of H.S. Lee who did not contest the 1959 elections and Mohd Khir Johari who was contesting in the constituency of Kedah Tengah, where elections had been postponed to 30 September 1959.

This is a list of the members of the second cabinet of the first Prime Minister of Malaysia (then Prime Minister of the Federation of Malaya), Tunku Abdul Rahman.

== Composition ==
=== Full members ===
The federal cabinet consisted of the following ministers:

| Portfolio | Office bearer | Party | Constituency | Term start | Term end |
|---|---|---|---|---|---|
| Prime Minister | Tunku Abdul Rahman MP | UMNO | Kuala Kedah | | |
| Deputy Prime Minister | Abdul Razak Hussein MP | UMNO | Pekan | | |
| Minister of Defence | Abdul Razak Hussein MP | UMNO | Pekan | | |
| Minister of External Affairs | Ismail Abdul Rahman MP | UMNO | Johore Timor | | |
| Minister of Commerce and Industry | Ismail Abdul Rahman MP | UMNO | Johore Timor | | |
| Minister of Health | V. T. Sambanthan MP | MIC | Sungei Siput | | |
| Minister of the Interior | Suleiman Abdul Rahman MP | UMNO | Muar Selatan | | |
| Minister of Works, Posts and Telecommunications | Sardon Jubir MP | UMNO | Pontian Utara | | |
| Minister of Labour and Social Welfare | Ong Yoke Lin MP | MCA | Ulu Selangor | | |
| Minister of Finance | Tan Siew Sin MP | MCA | Malacca Tengah | | |
| Minister of Natural Resources | Bahaman Samsudin MP | UMNO | Kuala Pilah | | |
| Minister of Transport | Abdul Rahman Talib MP | UMNO | Kuantan | | |
| Minister of Education | Abdul Aziz Ishak MP | UMNO | Kuala Langat | | |
| Minister of Agriculture | Abdul Aziz Ishak MP | UMNO | Kuala Langat | | |

== First reshuffle (November 1959 – 1961) ==
=== Full members ===
| Office | Incumbent | Party | Constituency |
|---|---|---|---|
| Prime Minister | Tunku Abdul Rahman MP | UMNO | Kuala Kedah |
| Deputy Prime Minister | Abdul Razak Hussein MP | UMNO | Pekan |
| Minister of Defence | Abdul Razak Hussein MP | UMNO | Pekan |
| Minister of External Affairs | Ismail Abdul Rahman MP | UMNO | Johore Timor |
| Minister of Finance | Tan Siew Sin MP | MCA | Malacca Tengah |
| Minister of Works, Posts and Telecommunications | V. T. Sambanthan MP | MIC | Sungei Siput |
| Minister of the Interior | Suleiman Abdul Rahman MP | UMNO | Muar Selatan |
| Minister of Agriculture and Co-operatives | Abdul Aziz Ishak MP | UMNO | Kuala Langat |
| Minister of Transport | Sardon Jubir MP | UMNO | Pontian Utara |
| Minister of Health and Social Welfare | Ong Yoke Lin MP | MCA | Ulu Selangor |
| Minister of Education | Khir Johari MP | UMNO | Kedah Tengah |
| Minister of Commerce and Industry | Khir Johari MP | UMNO | Kedah Tengah |
| Minister of Labour | Bahaman Samsudin MP | UMNO | Kuala Pilah |
| Minister of Justice | Senator Leong Yew Koh | MCA | |
| Minister without Portfolio | Abdul Rahman Talib MP | UMNO | Kuantan |

=== Assistant ministers ===
| Office | Incumbent | Party | Constituency |
|---|---|---|---|
| Assistant Prime Minister | Syed Jaafar Albar MP | UMNO | Johore Tengah |
| Assistant Prime Minister | Abdul Hamid Khan MP | UMNO | Batang Padang |
| Assistant Prime Minister | Abdul Khalid Awang Osman MP | UMNO | Kota Star Utara |
| Assistant Prime Minister | Cheah Theam Swee MP | MCA | Bukit Bintang |

== Second reshuffle (1961 – 1962) ==
=== Full members ===
| Office | Incumbent | Party | Constituency |
|---|---|---|---|
| Prime Minister | Tunku Abdul Rahman MP | UMNO | Kuala Kedah |
| Minister of External Affairs | Tunku Abdul Rahman MP | UMNO | Kuala Kedah |
| Deputy Prime Minister | Abdul Razak Hussein MP | UMNO | Pekan |
| Minister of Defence | Abdul Razak Hussein MP | UMNO | Pekan |
| Minister of Rural Development | Abdul Razak Hussein MP | UMNO | Pekan |
| Minister of Internal Security | Ismail Abdul Rahman MP | UMNO | Johore Timor |
| Minister of the Interior | Ismail Abdul Rahman MP | UMNO | Johore Timor |
| Minister of Finance | Tan Siew Sin MP | MCA | Malacca Tengah |
| Minister of Works, Posts and Telecommunications | V. T. Sambanthan MP | MIC | Sungei Siput |
| Minister of Agriculture and Co-operatives | Abdul Aziz Ishak MP | UMNO | Kuala Langat |
| Minister of Transport | Sardon Jubir MP | UMNO | Pontian Utara |
| Minister of Health and Social Welfare | Ong Yoke Lin MP | MCA | Ulu Selangor |
| Minister of Education | Abdul Rahman Talib MP | UMNO | Kuantan |
| Minister of Commerce and Industry | Khir Johari MP | UMNO | Kedah Tengah |
| Minister of Labour | Bahaman Samsudin MP | UMNO | Kuala Pilah |
| Minister of Justice | Senator Leong Yew Koh | MCA | |

=== Assistant ministers ===
| Office | Incumbent | Party | Constituency |
|---|---|---|---|
| Assistant Minister of Education | Abdul Hamid Khan MP | UMNO | Batang Padang |
| Assistant Minister of Rural Development | Abdul Khalid Awang Osman MP | UMNO | Kota Star Utara |
| Assistant Minister of Commerce and Industry | Cheah Theam Swee MP | MCA | Bukit Bintang |
| Assistant Minister of Labour | V. Manickavasagam MP | MIC | Klang |
| Assistant Minister of the Interior | Mohamed Ismail Mohamed Yusof MP | UMNO | Jerai |
| Assistant Minister of Information and Broadcasting | Syed Jaafar Albar MP | UMNO | Johore Tengah |

== Third reshuffle (1962 – ) ==
=== Full members ===
| Office | Incumbent | Party | Constituency |
|---|---|---|---|
| Prime Minister | Tunku Abdul Rahman MP | UMNO | Kuala Kedah |
| Minister of External Affairs | Tunku Abdul Rahman MP | UMNO | Kuala Kedah |
| Minister of Information and Broadcasting | Tunku Abdul Rahman MP | UMNO | Kuala Kedah |
| Deputy Prime Minister | Abdul Razak Hussein MP | UMNO | Pekan |
| Minister of Defence | Abdul Razak Hussein MP | UMNO | Pekan |
| Minister of Rural Development | Abdul Razak Hussein MP | UMNO | Pekan |
| Minister of Internal Security | Ismail Abdul Rahman MP | UMNO | Johore Timor |
| Minister of the Interior | Ismail Abdul Rahman MP | UMNO | Johore Timor |
| Minister of Finance | Tan Siew Sin MP | MCA | Malacca Tengah |
| Minister of Works, Posts and Telecommunications | V. T. Sambanthan MP | MIC | Sungei Siput |
| Minister of Transport | Sardon Jubir MP | UMNO | Pontian Utara |
| Minister of Agriculture and Co-operatives | Khir Johari MP | UMNO | Kedah Tengah |
| Minister of Health | Abdul Rahman Talib MP | UMNO | Kuantan |
| Minister of Commerce and Industry | Lim Swee Aun MP | MCA | Larut Selatan |
| Minister of Labour and Social Welfare | Bahaman Samsudin MP | UMNO | Kuala Pilah |
| Minister of Education | Abdul Hamid Khan MP | UMNO | Batang Padang |
| Minister without Portfolio | Sulaiman Abdul Rahman MP | UMNO | Muar Selatan |
| Minister without Portfolio | Abdul Aziz Ishak MP | UMNO | Kuala Langat |
| Minister without Portfolio | Ong Yoke Lin MP | MCA | Ulu Selangor |
| Minister of Justice | Senator Leong Yew Koh | MCA | |

=== Assistant ministers ===
| Office | Incumbent | Party | Constituency |
|---|---|---|---|
| Assistant Minister of the Interior | Cheah Theam Swee MP | MCA | Bukit Bintang |
| Assistant Minister of Labour and Social Welfare | V. Manickavasagam MP | MIC | Klang |
| Assistant Minister of Commerce and Industry | Abdul Khalid Awang Osman MP | UMNO | Kota Star Utara |
| Assistant Minister of Information and Broadcasting | Mohamed Ismail Mohamed Yusof MP | UMNO | Jerai |

== Composition before cabinet dissolution ==
=== Full members ===
| Office | Incumbent | Party | Constituency |
|---|---|---|---|
| Prime Minister | Tunku Abdul Rahman MP | UMNO | Kuala Kedah |
| Minister of External Affairs | Tunku Abdul Rahman MP | UMNO | Kuala Kedah |
| Minister of Information and Broadcasting | Tunku Abdul Rahman MP | UMNO | Kuala Kedah |
| Deputy Prime Minister | Abdul Razak Hussein MP | UMNO | Pekan |
| Minister of Defence | Abdul Razak Hussein MP | UMNO | Pekan |
| Minister of Rural Development | Abdul Razak Hussein MP | UMNO | Pekan |
| Minister of Internal Security | Ismail Abdul Rahman MP | UMNO | Johore Timor |
| Minister of the Interior | Ismail Abdul Rahman MP | UMNO | Johore Timor |
| Minister of Finance | Tan Siew Sin MP | MCA | Malacca Tengah |
| Minister of Works, Posts and Telecommunications | V. T. Sambanthan MP | MIC | Sungei Siput |
| Minister of Transport | Sardon Jubir MP | UMNO | Pontian Utara |
| Minister of Agriculture and Co-operatives | Khir Johari MP | UMNO | Kedah Tengah |
| Minister of Labour and Social Welfare | Bahaman Samsudin MP | UMNO | Kuala Pilah |
| Minister of Health | Abdul Rahman Talib MP | UMNO | Kuantan |
| Minister of Commerce and Industry | Lim Swee Aun MP | MCA | Larut Selatan |
| Minister of Education | Abdul Hamid Khan MP | UMNO | Batang Padang |
| Minister of Sarawak Affairs | Jugah Barieng MP | PESAKA | |
| Minister without Portfolio | Ong Yoke Lin MP | MCA | Ulu Selangor |
| Minister without Portfolio | Senator Khaw Kai Boh | MCA | |

=== Assistant ministers ===
| Office | Incumbent | Party | Constituency |
|---|---|---|---|
| Assistant Minister of the Interior | Cheah Theam Swee MP | MCA | Bukit Bintang |
| Assistant Minister of Commerce and Industry | Abdul Khalid Awang Osman MP | UMNO | Kota Star Utara |
| Assistant Minister of Information and Broadcasting | Mohamed Ismail Mohamed Yusof MP | UMNO | Jerai |
| Assistant Minister of Rural Development | Senator Mohamed Ghazali Jawi | UMNO | |
| Assistant Minister of Rural Development (Sarawak) | Abdul Rahman Ya'kub MP | BUMIPUTERA | |
| Assistant Minister of Labour and Social Welfare | V. Manickavasagam MP | MIC | Klang |

== See also ==
- Members of the Dewan Rakyat, 1st Malayan Parliament
