= Rahman Cabinet =

Rahman Cabinet is the name of either of four cabinets of Malaysia (including Federation of Malaya):

- Cabinet Rahman I (1955–1959)
- Cabinet Rahman II (1959–1964)
- Cabinet Rahman III (1964–1969)
- Cabinet Rahman IV (1969–1970)
