= Deputy Minister of Rural and Regional Development (Malaysia) =

Malaysian government deputy minister

- Timbalan Menteri Kemajuan Desa dan Wilayah
- Coat of Arms of Government of Malaysia
- Incumbent; Rubiah Wang since 10 December 2022
- Ministry of Rural and Regional Development
- Style: Yang Berhormat
- Member of: Cabinet of Malaysia
- Reports to: Prime Minister; Minister of Rural and Regional Development
- Seat: Putrajaya
- Appointer: Yang di-Pertuan Agong; on advice of the Prime Minister
- Inaugural holder: Abdul Khalid Awang Osman (as Assistant Minister of Rural Development)
- Formation: 1961

The Deputy Minister of Rural and Regional Development (Malay: Timbalan Menteri Kemajuan Desa dan Wilayah; Chinese: 乡村及区域发展部副部长; Tamil: ஊரக மற்றும் வட்டார வளர்ச்சி துணை அமைச்சர்) is a Malaysian cabinet position serving as deputy head of the Ministry of Rural and Regional Development.

== List of Deputy Ministers of Rural and Regional Development ==
The following individuals have been appointed as Deputy Minister of Plantation and Commodities, or any of its precedent titles:

Colour key (for political coalition/parties):

Coalition	Component party	Timeline
Alliance Party	United Malays National Organisation (UMNO)	1957–1973
Barisan Nasional (BN)	United Malays National Organisation (UMNO)	1973–present
Barisan Nasional (BN)	Malaysian Chinese Association (MCA)	1973–present
Barisan Nasional (BN)	Malaysian Indian Congress (MIC)	1973–present
Barisan Nasional (BN)	Progressive Democratic Party (PDP)	
Barisan Nasional (BN)	Parti Rakyat Sarawak (PRS)	–2018
Barisan Nasional (BN)	Parti Bersatu Rakyat Sabah (PBRS)	–present
Barisan Nasional (BN)	Parti Pesaka Bumiputera Bersatu (PBB)	1973–2018
Gabungan Parti Sarawak (GPS)	Parti Pesaka Bumiputera Bersatu (PBB)	2018–present
Pakatan Harapan (PH)	People's Justice Party (PKR)	2015–present
Perikatan Nasional (PN)	Malaysian United Indigenous Party (BERSATU)	2020–present

=== Assistant Minister of Rural Development ===
Portrait	Name (Birth–Death) Constituency	Political coalition	Political party	Took office	Left office	Prime Minister (Cabinet)
	Abdul Khalid Awang Osman (b.?); MP for Kota Star Utara	Alliance	UMNO	1961	1962	Tunku Abdul Rahman (II)
	Mohamed Ghazali Jawi (b.?); Senator	BN	UMNO			Tunku Abdul Rahman (II)
	Abdul Rahman Ya'kub (b.?); MP for	–	BUMIPUTERA			Tunku Abdul Rahman (II)
Post renamed into Assistant Minister of National and Rural Development
=== Assistant Minister of National and Rural Development ===
Portrait	Name (Birth–Death) Constituency	Political coalition	Political party	Took office	Left office	Prime Minister (Cabinet)
	Abdul Rahman Ya'kub (b.?); MP for	–	BUMIPUTERA			Tunku Abdul Rahman (III)
	Abdul Samad Idris (1923–2003); MP for Kuala Pilah	BN	UMNO	1969	1974	Tunku Abdul Rahman (IIII); Abdul Razak Hussein (First Razak cabinet)
Post renamed into Deputy Minister of Agriculture and Rural Development
=== Deputy Minister of Agriculture and Rural Development ===
Portrait	Name (Birth–Death) Constituency	Political coalition	Political party	Took office	Left office	Prime Minister (Cabinet)
	Mustapha Abdul Jabar (born ?); MP for Sabak Bernam	BN	UMNO	1974	1976	Abdul Razak Hussein (II)
	Mokhtar Hashim (1942–2020); MP for Tampin	BN	UMNO	1974	1975	Abdul Razak Hussein (II)
Post renamed into Deputy Minister of Lands and Regional Development
=== Deputy Minister of Lands and Regional Development ===
Portrait	Name (Birth–Death) Constituency	Political coalition	Political party	Took office	Left office	Prime Minister (Cabinet)
	Sulaiman Daud (1933–2010); MP of Santubong	BN	PBB	1976	1977	Hussein Onn (I)
	Sanusi Junid (1942–2018); MP of Jerlun-Langkawi	BN	UMNO	1978		Hussein Onn (II)
	Mohd. Kassim Ahmed (b.?); MP of Machang	BN	UMNO	11 August 1986	20 May 1987	Mahathir Mohamad (III)
	Mohd Khalid Mohd Yunus (b.1943); MP of Jempol	BN	UMNO	20 May 1987	26 October 1990	Mahathir Mohamad (III)
Post renamed into Deputy Minister of National and Rural Development
=== Deputy Minister of National and Rural Development ===
Portrait	Name (Birth–Death) Constituency	Political coalition	Political party	Took office	Left office	Prime Minister (Cabinet)
	Abdillah Abdul Hamid (b.?); MP for Silam	BN	BERJAYA			Mahathir Mohamad (II)
	Tajol Rosli Mohd Ghazali (b.1946); MP for Gerik	BN	UMNO	11 August 1986	26 October 1990	Mahathir Mohamad (III)
	Ng Cheng Kuai (b.?); MP for Lumut	BN	MCA	11 August 1986	20 May 1987	Mahathir Mohamad (III)
Post renamed into Deputy Minister of Rural Development
=== Deputy Minister of Rural Development ===
Portrait	Name (Birth–Death) Constituency	Political coalition	Political party	Took office	Left office	Prime Minister (Cabinet)
	Mohd. Yasin Kamari (b.?); MP for Sri Gading	BN	UMNO	27 October 1990	3 May 1995	Mahathir Mohamad (IIII)
	K. Kumaran (b.); MP for Tapah	BN	MIC	8 May 1995	14 December 1999	Mahathir Mohamad (V)
	Palanivel Govindasamy (b.1949); MP for Hulu Selangor	BN	MIC	15 December 1999	26 March 2004	Mahathir Mohamad (VI); Abdullah Ahmad Badawi (I)
	Sivarasa Rasiah (b.1956); MP of Sungai Buloh	PH	PKR	2 July 2018	24 February 2020	Mahathir Mohamad (VII)
	Abdul Rahman Mohamad (b.1964); MP for Lipis	BN	UMNO	10 March 2020	24 November 2022	Muhyiddin Yassin (I)
	Henry Sum Agong (b.1946); MP for Lawas	GPS	PBB	10 March 2020	16 August 2021	Muhyiddin Yassin (I)
	Hasbi Habibollah (b.1963); MP for Limbang	GPS	PBB	30 August 2021	24 November 2022	Ismail Sabri Yaakob (I)
Post renamed into Deputy Minister of Rural and Regional Development
=== Deputy Minister of Rural and Regional Development ===
Portrait	Name (Birth–Death) Constituency	Political coalition	Political party	Took office	Left office	Prime Minister (Cabinet)
	Awang Adek Hussin (b.1956); MP for Bachok	BN	UMNO	27 March 2004	14 February 2006	Abdullah Ahmad Badawi (II)
	Tiki Lafe (b.1954); MP for Mas Gading	BN	SPDP	27 March 2004	18 March 2008	Abdullah Ahmad Badawi (II)
	Zainal Abidin Osman (1960–2018); MP for Nibong Tebal	BN	UMNO	14 February 2006	18 March 2008	Abdullah Ahmad Badawi (II)
	Joseph Kurup (b.1944); MP for Pensiangan	BN	PBRS	19 March 2008	9 April 2009	Abdullah Ahmad Badawi (III)
	Joseph Entulu Belaun (b.1954); MP for Selangau	BN	PRS	19 March 2008	9 April 2009	Abdullah Ahmad Badawi (III)
	Hasan Malek (b.1946); MP for Kuala Pilah	BN	UMNO	10 April 2009	15 May 2013	Najib Razak (I)
	Joseph Entulu Belaun (b.1954); MP for Selangau	BN	PRS	10 April 2009	15 May 2013	Najib Razak (I)
	Alexander Nanta Linggi (b.1958); MP for Kapit	BN	PBB	16 May 2013	9 May 2018	Najib Razak (II)
	Ahmad Jazlan Yaakub (b.1964); MP for Machang	BN	UMNO	29 July 2015	9 May 2018	Najib Razak (II)
	Rubiah Wang (b.?); MP for Kota Samarahan	GPS	PBB	10 December 2022	Incumbent	Anwar Ibrahim (I)

== See also ==
- Minister of Rural and Regional Development (Malaysia)
