= Third Rahman cabinet =

- 3rd Cabinet of Malaysia

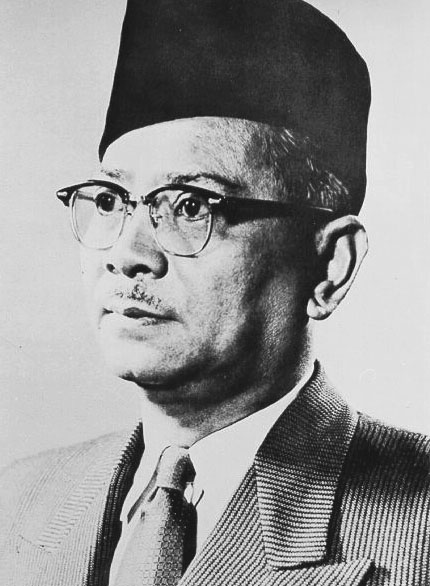

People and organisations
- Head of state: Tuanku Syed Putra (1964–1965); Tuanku Ismail Nasiruddin Shah (1965–1969)
- Head of government: Tunku Abdul Rahman
- Deputy head of government: Abdul Razak Hussein
- Member parties: Alliance Party: United Malays National Organisation; Malaysian Chinese Association; Malaysian Indian Congress
- Status in legislature: Coalition government
- Opposition parties: Pan-Malayan Islamic Party; People's Progressive Party; Labour Party of Malaya; United Democratic Party; People's Action Party (until 1965)
- Opposition leader: Tan Chee Khoon

History
- Election: 1964 Malaysian general election
- Outgoing election: 1969 Malaysian general election
- Legislature term: 2nd Malaysian Parliament
- Budgets: 1965, 1966, 1967, 1968, 1969
- Predecessor: Second Rahman cabinet
- Successor: Fourth Rahman cabinet

Tunku Abdul Rahman formed the third Rahman cabinet after being invited by Tuanku Syed Putra to begin a new government following the 25 April 1964 general election in Malaysia. Prior to the election, Rahman led (as Prime Minister) the first Rahman cabinet, a coalition government that consisted of members of the component parties of Alliance Party. It was the 3rd cabinet of Malaysia formed since independence.

This is a list of the members of the third cabinet of the first Prime Minister of Malaysia, Tunku Abdul Rahman.

== Composition ==
=== Full members ===
The federal cabinet consisted of the following ministers:

Portfolio	Office bearer	Party	Constituency	Term start	Term end
Prime Minister	Tunku Abdul Rahman MP	UMNO	Kuala Kedah		
Minister of External Affairs	Tunku Abdul Rahman MP	UMNO	Kuala Kedah		
Minister of Youth, Culture and Sports	Tunku Abdul Rahman MP	UMNO	Kuala Kedah		
Deputy Prime Minister	Abdul Razak Hussein MP	UMNO	Pekan		
Minister of Defence	Abdul Razak Hussein MP	UMNO	Pekan		
Minister of National and Rural Development	Abdul Razak Hussein MP	UMNO	Pekan		
Minister of Lands and Mines	Abdul Razak Hussein MP	UMNO	Pekan		
Minister of Home Affairs	Ismail Abdul Rahman MP	UMNO	Johore Timor		
Minister of Justice	Ismail Abdul Rahman MP	UMNO	Johore Timor		
Minister of Finance	Tan Siew Sin MP	MCA	Malacca Tengah		
Minister of Works, Posts and Telecommunications	V. T. Sambanthan MP	MIC	Sungei Siput		
Minister of Transport	Sardon Jubir MP	UMNO	Pontian Utara		
Minister of Agriculture and Co-operatives	Khir Johari MP	UMNO	Kedah Tengah		
Minister of Health	Bahaman Samsudin MP	UMNO	Kuala Pilah		
Minister of Education	Abdul Rahman Talib MP	UMNO	Kuantan		
Minister of Commerce and Industry	Lim Swee Aun MP	MCA	Larut Selatan		
Minister of Welfare Services	Abdul Hamid Khan MP	UMNO	Batang Padang		
Minister of Local Government and Housing	Khaw Kai Boh MP	MCA	Ulu Selangor		
Minister of Sarawak Affairs	Jugah Barieng MP	PESAKA			
Minister of Labour	V. Manickavasagam MP	MIC	Klang		
Minister of Information and Broadcasting	Senu Abdul Rahman MP	UMNO	Kubang Pasu Barat		
Minister without Portfolio	Senator Ong Yoke Lin	MCA			

=== Assistant ministers ===
Portfolio	Office bearer	Party	Constituency	Term start	Term end
Assistant Minister of Commerce and Industry	Abdul Khalid Awang Osman MP	UMNO	Kota Star Utara		
Assistant Minister of Lands and Mines	Mohamed Ghazali Jawi MP	UMNO	Ulu Perak		
Assistant Minister of National and Rural Development	Abdul Rahman Ya'kub MP	BUMIPUTERA			
Assistant Minister of Justice	Abdul Rahman Ya'kub MP	BUMIPUTERA			
Assistant Minister of Agriculture and Co-operatives	Sulaiman Bulon MP	UMNO	Bagan Datoh		
Assistant Minister of Youth, Culture and Sports	Engku Muhsein Abdul Kadir MP	UMNO	Trengganu Tengah		
Assistant Minister of Education	Lee Siok Yew MP	MCA	Sepang		

== Composition before cabinet dissolution ==
=== Full members ===
Office	Incumbent	Party	Constituency
Prime Minister	Tunku Abdul Rahman MP	UMNO	Kuala Kedah
Minister of External Affairs	Tunku Abdul Rahman MP	UMNO	Kuala Kedah
Deputy Prime Minister	Abdul Razak Hussein MP	UMNO	Pekan
Minister of Defence	Abdul Razak Hussein MP	UMNO	Pekan
Minister of Home Affairs	Abdul Razak Hussein MP	UMNO	Pekan
Minister of National and Rural Development	Abdul Razak Hussein MP	UMNO	Pekan
Minister of Finance	Tan Siew Sin MP	MCA	Malacca Tengah
Minister of Works, Posts and Telecommunications	V. T. Sambanthan MP	MIC	Sungei Siput
Minister of Transport	Sardon Jubir MP	UMNO	Pontian Utara
Minister of Education	Khir Johari MP	UMNO	Kedah Tengah
Minister of Justice	Bahaman Samsudin MP	UMNO	Kuala Pilah
Minister of Commerce and Industry	Lim Swee Aun MP	MCA	Larut Selatan
Minister of Health	Abdul Hamid Khan MP	UMNO	Batang Padang
Minister of Local Government and Housing	Khaw Kai Boh MP	MCA	Ulu Selangor
Minister of Labour	V. Manickavasagam MP	MIC	Klang
Minister of Sarawak Affairs	Jugah Barieng MP	PESAKA	
Minister of Information and Broadcasting	Senu Abdul Rahman MP	UMNO	Kubang Pasu Barat
Minister of Culture, Youth and Sports	Senu Abdul Rahman MP	UMNO	Kubang Pasu Barat
Minister of Agriculture and Co-operatives	Mohamed Ghazali Jawi MP	UMNO	Ulu Perak
Minister of Lands and Mines	Abdul Rahman Ya'kub MP	BUMIPUTERA	
Minister of General Welfare	Ng Kam Poh MP	MCA	Telok Anson
Minister of Sabah Affairs	Abdul Ghani Gilong MP	USNO	
Minister without Portfolio	Senator Abdul Ghafar Baba MLA Malacca	UMNO	
Minister without Portfolio	Senator Ong Yoke Lin	MCA	

=== Assistant ministers ===
Office	Incumbent	Party	Constituency
Assistant Minister without Portfolio	Abdul Khalid Awang Osman MP	UMNO	Kota Star Utara
Assistant Minister of Culture, Youth and Sports	Engku Muhsein Abdul Kadir MP	UMNO	Trengganu Tengah
Assistant Minister of Education	Lee Siok Yew MP	MCA	Sepang
Assistant Minister of Home Affairs	Hamzah Abu Samah MP	UMNO	Raub
Assistant Minister of Commerce and Industry	Abdul Taib Mahmud MP	BUMIPUTRA	

== See also ==
- Members of the Dewan Rakyat, 2nd Malaysian Parliament
- List of parliamentary secretaries of Malaysia#Third Rahman cabinet
