= First Rahman cabinet =

- 1st Cabinet of Malaya
- 9 August 1955 – 19 August 1959
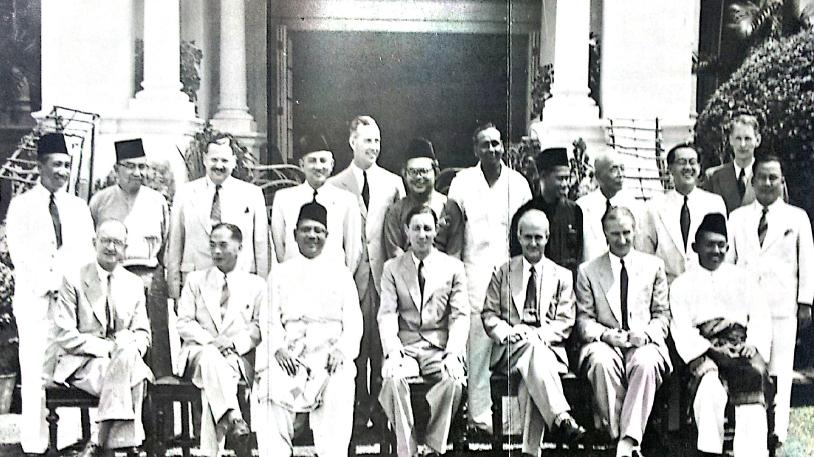
- Chief minister Tunku Abdul Rahman (sitting, third from right) with the first Malayan cabinet at the King's House, 9 August 1955
- Date formed: 9 August 1955
- Date dissolved: 19 August 1959

People and organisations
- Head of state: Elizabeth II (1955–1957); Abdul Rahman (1957–1959)
- Head of government: Tunku Abdul Rahman
- Deputy head of government: Abdul Razak Hussein (1957–1959)
- No. of ministers: 10
- Member parties: Alliance Party: UMNO; Malayan Chinese Association; Malayan Indian Congress
- Status in legislature: Coalition government
- Opposition party: Pan-Malayan Islamic Party
- Opposition leader: Ahmad Tuan Hussein (de facto)

History
- Election: 1955 Malayan general election
- Outgoing election: 1959 Malayan general election
- Successor: Second Rahman cabinet

The first Rahman cabinet (9 August 1955 – 19 August 1959) was the first cabinet of the Federation of Malaya following the conclusion of Malaya's first nationwide general elections held on 27 July 1955. It was formed by chief minister-designate Tunku Abdul Rahman of the Alliance Party upon the invitation by the High Commissioner of Malaya, Donald MacGillivray from the King's House on 2 August 1955.

The cabinet was sworn in on 9 August 1955 and dissolved on 19 August 1959 prior to Malaya's second general election. The original cabinet had ten ministers and five assistant ministers. There were two reshuffles in the cabinet, the first on 29 February 1956 and a second on 29 August 1957. The tenure of the cabinet extended beyond the independence of Malaya on 31 August 1957. It was the last cabinet to hold office under British protectorate and was the first to hold office after independence.

== History ==
In Malaya's first nationwide general elections held on 27 July 1955, the Alliance Party achieved a major landslide by winning 51 of the 52 seats it contested. Tunku Abdul Rahman, leader of the Alliance, became chief minister-designate tasked to form the cabinet.

Five important positions or ministries in the government, the chief secretary, financial secretary, attorney-general, and the ministers of economics affairs and defence were reserved for the High Commissioner, but were expected to support the Alliance in the Federal Legislative Council. Discussions about the cabinet were made between Tunku and Tan Cheng Lock on 31 July 1955, and were discussed with and accepted by High Commissioner Donald MacGillivray on 1 August at the King's House.

The Alliance tethered around deciding 10 or 11 ministers in the cabinet. A new unnamed ministry was proposed for Malacca Central member of parliament Tan Siew Sin, but he refused the offer and the ministry was never formed. K. L. Devaser was also proposed to be the cabinet's first Indian minister but it went to V. T. Sambanthan instead. The Alliance also planned for five assistant ministers but believed it needed at least two in the government.

On 2 August 1955, the first iteration of the cabinet was announced, involving 10 ministers and 5 assistant ministers. There were six Malays, three Chinese and an Indian minister, reflecting the three major communal parties within the Alliance (UMNO, MCA, and MIC). The reception was favorable even among opposition politicians and union leaders, with praise given to its relatively young ministers and its multiracial composition. The ministers were sworn in at a private ceremony in the King's House on 9 August. The cabinet dissolved on 19 August 1959 in anticipation of the country's second general election held the same day.

=== 1956 reshuffle ===
After the Treaty of London, a reshuffle of the Malayan government was seen as inevitable. On 28 February 1956, a reshuffle was announced by Tunku Abdul Rahman. The ministries of Natural Resources and Communications were abolished – the former divided between the Ministry of Agriculture and Local Government; the latter merged with the Ministry of Works to form the Ministry of Works and Communications. The ministries of Defence and Finance were introduced in the reshuffle.

Reappointments include Tunku as the inaugural Minister of Internal Defence and Security, Ismail Abdul Rahman from Natural Resources as the inaugural Minister of Commerce and Industry, H. S. Lee from Transport as the inaugural Minister of Finance, Ong Yoke Lin from Communications to Transport, Khir Johari as Assistant Minister of Works and Communications, and Abdul Rahman Talib as Assistant Minister for Local Government. The reshuffle was confirmed on 29 February.

=== 1957 reshuffle ===
In anticipation of Malayan independence on 31 August 1957, a reshuffle was announced as early as 7 August. As late as 27 August, the Alliance Party leadership decided that assistant ministers would be abolished from the new government. On 28 August, the new list of ministers from the reshuffled government was announced, which featured a complete reshuffle except for three ministers apart from the prime minister in the original government. The new ministers were sworn in by the inaugural King of Malaysia, Abdul Rahman of Negeri Sembilan on 31 August at the Istana Negara.

Although tipped to replace Leong Yew Koh as the Minister of Health, Assistant Minister of Education Too Joon Hing was removed from the cabinet in the 1957 reshuffle and was reassigned to a diplomatic position. The removal created a minor controversy as Tunku insisted that his role remained in the government despite its abolishment after independence, much to the surprise of the new education minister Khir Johari. Too's term was terminated on 31 December 1957, four months after independence.

== List of ministers ==
=== Original composition ===
On 2 August 1955, the first iteration of the cabinet was announced, involving ten ministers and five assistant ministers.

Portfolio	Portrait	Minister (birth–death) Constituency	Term of office		Notes
Portfolio	Portrait	Minister (birth–death) Constituency	Took office	Left office	Notes
Full ministers
Chief minister (Note: As prime minister after 31 August 1957.) Minister of Home Affairs		His Highness; Tunku Abdul Rahman; تونكو عبدالرحمن; (1903–1990); MP for Kuala Kedah	9 August 1955	19 August 1959	–
Minister of Education		Tun; Abdul Razak Hussein; عبد الرزاق حسين; (1922–1976); MP for Pekan	9 August 1955	30 August 1957	Reappointed as deputy prime minister on 31 August 1957.
Minister of Natural Resources		Tun; Ismail Abdul Rahman; اسماعيل عبدالرحمن; (1915–1973); MP for Johore Timor	9 August 1955	28 Feb. 1956	Position abolished and reappointed as Minister of Commerce and Industry on 29 February 1956.
Minister of Transport		Colonel Tun Sir; H. S. Lee; 李孝式; (1900–1988); Nominated non-MP	9 August 1955	28 Feb. 1956	Reappointed as Minister of Finance on 29 February 1956.
Minister of Agriculture and Co-operatives		The Honorable; Aziz Ishak; عزيز اسحاق; (1915–1999); MP for Selangor Barat	9 August 1955	19 August 1959	–
Minister of Health		Major General Tun; Leong Yew Koh; 梁宇皋; (1888–1963); MP for Ipoh-Menglembu	9 August 1955	30 August 1957	Appointed as the Yang di-Pertua Negeri of Malacca on 31 August 1957.
Minister of Works		Tun Dato' Seri Utama; Sardon Jubir; سعدون زبير; (1917–1985); MP for Segamat	9 August 1955	30 August 1957	As the Minister of Works and Communications after 29 February 1956.
Minister of Lands, Mines and Local Government		Dato'; Suleiman Abdul Rahman; سوليايمان عبدالرحمن; (1912–1963); MP for Johore Bahru	9 August 1955	30 August 1957	Reappointed as Minister of Interior and Justice on 31 August 1957.
Minister of Communications, Telecommunications and Posts		Tun; Ong Yoke Lin; 翁毓麟; (1917–2010); MP for Kuala Lumpur Barat	9 August 1955	28 Feb. 1956	Position abolished and reappointed as Minister of Transport on 29 February 1956.
Minister of Labour		Tun; V. T. Sambanthan; திருஞானசம்பந்தன்; (1919–1979); MP for Kinta Utara	9 August 1955	30 August 1957	Reappointed as Minister of Health on 31 August 1957.
Assistant ministers
Assistant Minister of Home Affairs		Tan Sri; Bahaman Samsudin; بهامن شمس الدين; (1906–1995); MP for Telok Anson	9 August 1955	30 August 1957	Reappointed as Minister of Natural Resources on 31 August 1957.
Assistant Minister of Education		Dato'; Too Joon Hing; 朱運興; (1911–2002); MP for Kinta Selatan	9 August 1955	31 Dec. 1957	Term terminated effective 31 December 1957.
Assistant Minister of Agriculture and Co-operatives		Tan Sri; Mohamad Khir Johari; محمد خير جوهري; (1923–2006); MP for Kedah Tengah	9 August 1955	28 Feb. 1956	Reappointed as Assistant Minister of Works and Communications on 29 February 1956.
Assistant Minister of Health		The Honorable; Abdul Rahman Talib; عبدالرحمن طالب; (1916–1968); MP for Pahang Timor	9 August 1955	28 Feb. 1956	Reappointed as Assistant Minister of Lands, Mines and Local Government on 29 February 1956.
Assistant Minister of Works		Tan Sri; Abdul Khalid Awang Osman; عبدالخالد اوڠ عثمان; (1925–1986); MP for Kelantan Selatan	9 August 1955	30 August 1957	–

=== Reshuffled ministers (1956) ===
The cabinet reshuffle on 29 February 1956 abolished the ministries of Natural Resources and Telecommunications, introduced the ministries of Defence and Finance, and reassigned three ministers and two assistant ministers.

Portfolio	Portrait	Minister (birth–death) Constituency	Term of office		Notes
Portfolio	Portrait	Minister (birth–death) Constituency	Took office	Left office	Notes
Full ministers
Chief minister (Note: As prime minister after 31 August 1957.) Minister of Home Affairs		His Highness; Tunku Abdul Rahman; تونكو عبدالرحمن; (1903–1990); MP for Kuala Kedah	9 August 1955	19 August 1959	–
Minister of Defence		His Highness; Tunku Abdul Rahman; تونكو عبدالرحمن; (1903–1990); MP for Kuala Kedah	29 Feb. 1956	30 August 1957	Ministry created on 29 February 1956.
Minister of Finance		Colonel Tun Sir; H. S. Lee; 李孝式; (1900–1988); Nominated non-MP	29 Feb. 1956	19 August 1959	Ministry created on 29 February 1956.
Minister of Commerce and Industry		Tun; Ismail Abdul Rahman; اسماعيل عبدالرحمن; (1915–1973); MP for Johore Timor	29 Feb. 1956	30 August 1957	Reappointed as Minister Plentipotentiary on 31 August 1957.
Minister of Transport		Tun; Ong Yoke Lin; 翁毓麟; (1917–2010); MP for Kuala Lumpur Barat	29 Feb. 1956	30 August 1957	Reappointed as Minister of Labour and Social Welfare on 31 August 1957.
Assistant ministers
Assistant Minister of Works and Communications		Tan Sri; Mohamad Khir Johari; محمد خير جوهري; (1923–2006); MP for Kedah Tengah	29 Feb. 1956	30 August 1957	Reappointed as Minister of Education on 31 August 1957.
Assistant Minister of Lands, Mines and Local Government		The Honorable; Abdul Rahman Talib; عبدالرحمن طالب; (1916–1968); MP for Pahang Timor	29 Feb. 1956	30 August 1957	Reappointed as Minister of Transport on 31 August 1957.

=== Merdeka cabinet (1957) ===
The cabinet reshuffle in anticipation of Malayan independence was announced on 28 August 1957, featuring a complete reshuffle except for three ministers apart from the prime minister in the original government and the removal of all assistant ministers. Health minister Leong Yew Koh, assistant minister of education Too Joon Hing, and assistant minister of works Awang Khalid Awang Hassan were removed from the cabinet.

Portfolio	Portrait	Minister (birth–death) Constituency	Term of office		Notes
Portfolio	Portrait	Minister (birth–death) Constituency	Took office	Left office	Notes
Prime minister (Note: As chief minister before 31 August 1957.)		His Highness; Tunku Abdul Rahman; تونكو عبدالرحمن; (1903–1990); MP for Kuala Kedah	9 August 1955	19 August 1959	–
Minister of External Affairs		His Highness; Tunku Abdul Rahman; تونكو عبدالرحمن; (1903–1990); MP for Kuala Kedah	31 August 1957	19 August 1959	–
Deputy prime minister Minister of Defence		Tun; Abdul Razak Hussein; عبد الرزاق حسين; (1922–1976); MP for Pekan	31 August 1957	19 August 1959	–
Minister of Finance		Colonel Tun Sir; H. S. Lee; 李孝式; (1900–1988); Nominated non-MP	29 Feb. 1956	19 August 1959	–
Minister of Commerce and Industry		Tun; Tan Siew Sin; 陳修信; (1916–1988); MP for Malacca Central	31 August 1957	19 August 1959	–
Minister of Education		Tan Sri; Mohamad Khir Johari; محمد خير جوهري; (1923–2006); MP for Kedah Tengah	31 August 1957	19 August 1959	–
Minister Plentipotentiary Permanent Representative of Malaya to the United Nations		Tun; Ismail Abdul Rahman; اسماعيل عبدالرحمن; (1915–1973); MP for Johore Timor	31 August 1957	19 August 1959	Also appointed as the Malayan ambassador to the United States.
Minister of Interior and Justice		Dato'; Suleiman Abdul Rahman; سوليايمان عبدالرحمن; (1912–1963); MP for Johore Bahru	31 August 1957	19 August 1959	The Ministry of Home Affairs was replaced by the Ministry of Interior and Justice on 31 August 1957.
Minister of Natural Resources		Tan Sri; Bahaman Samsudin; بهامن شمس الدين; (1906–1995); MP for Telok Anson	31 August 1957	19 August 1959	–
Minister of Transport		The Honorable; Abdul Rahman Talib; عبدالرحمن طالب; (1916–1968); MP for Pahang Timor	31 August 1957	19 August 1959	–
Minister of Agriculture and Co-operatives		The Honorable; Aziz Ishak; عزيز اسحاق; (1915–1999); MP for Selangor Barat	9 August 1955	19 August 1959	–
Minister of Health		Tun; V. T. Sambanthan; திருஞானசம்பந்தன்; (1919–1979); MP for Kinta Utara	31 August 1957	19 August 1959	–
Minister of Labour and Social Welfare		Tun; Ong Yoke Lin; 翁毓麟; (1917–2010); MP for Kuala Lumpur Barat	31 August 1957	19 August 1959	The Ministry of Labour was renamed as the Ministry of Labour and Social Welfare on 31 August 1957.
Minister of Works, Posts and Telecommunications		Tun Dato' Seri Utama; Sardon Jubir; سعدون زبير; (1917–1985); MP for Segamat	31 August 1957	19 August 1959	–

== See also ==
- Members of the Federal Legislative Council (1955–59)
