= Lim Swee Aun =

Malaysian politician

Yang Berbahagia Tan Sri Lim Swee Aun PMN JP
- 林瑞安
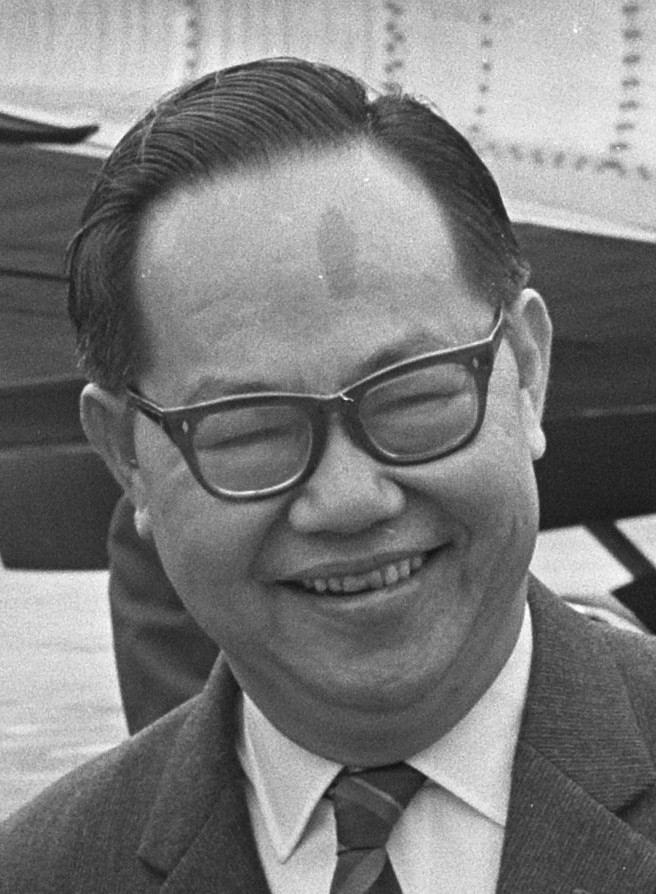
- Lim Swee Aun (1966)

Vice-President of the Malaysian Chinese Association
- In office 1959–1962

Minister of Commerce and Industry
- In office 10 October 1962 – 3 June 1969
- Prime Minister: Tunku Abdul Rahman
- Preceded by: Khir Johari
- Constituency: Larut Selatan

Minister of Health and Social Welfare
- In office 1 August 1962 – 10 October 1962
- Prime Minister: Tunku Abdul Rahman
- Preceded by: Abdul Aziz Ishak
- Succeeded by: Abdul Rahman Talib (as Minister of Health)
- Constituency: Larut Selatan

Personal details
- Born: 1 September 1915 Taiping, Perak, Federated Malay States, British Malaya (now Malaysia)
- Died: 13 August 1977 (aged 61) London, United Kingdom
- Party: Malayan Chinese Association (MCA)
- Other political affiliations: Alliance Party (–1973); Barisan Nasional (BN) (1973–1977)
- Spouse: Puan Sri Quek Eng Lan (郭英兰)
- Relations: Son of Lim Tee Hooi
- Children: 2 daughters and 2 sons
- Education: King Edward VII School (Taiping)
- Occupation: Medical Practitioner Malaysian Government Minister

Lim Swee Aun (Chinese: 林瑞安; pinyin: Lín Ruì'ān; 1 September 1915 – 13 August 1977) was a Malaysian Chinese politician from the Malaysian Chinese Association, and a Cabinet member.

== Early life ==
The eldest son of Lim Tee Hooi and Foong Cheong Ngan, Swee Aun was born on 1 September 1915 in Taiping, Perak and educated at the King Edward VII School (Taiping). He was a keen rugby player and played for the school in the 1930s. Swee Aun with Yahayaudin, Sulaiman and Harun were the first to be awarded colours.

=== College years ===
In June 1932, Swee Aun joined the King Edward VII College of Medicine in Singapore (subsequently merged with Raffles College to form the University of Malaya) at the age of 16 years. He gained Distinction in Anatomy in the 2nd Professional Examination, an honour he shared with his classmate Quek Eng Lan (whom he subsequently married on 22 August 1938). He was awarded a scholarship for this achievement. In the Final examination in 1938, Swee Aun obtained Distinction in Medicine and Materia Medica and was awarded the much coveted Lim Boon Keng Medal.

While in college, he was also a sportsman. He was captain of the Singapore All Blues Rugby Team in 1935 which won the trophy for Pan-Malayan Interstate Rugby Matches.

== Early working days ==
Lim Swee Aun completed his housemanship in Singapore General Hospital. In 1939 he was posted to the Sungai Buloh Leprosarium before moving to Ipoh General Hospital and to Taiping, Perak, his hometown in 1940.

== The war years ==
In December 1941, war came and Taiping experienced the first bomb on 8 December. The main attack from the Japanese Army came from the north. So Lim Swee Aun decided to evacuate his whole family to Rev. Quek Kheng Hoon's (his father-in-law) rambutan estate in Bukit Timah, Singapore.

Lim Swee Aun stayed on in Taiping Hospital and evacuated with the Medical Convoy by stages going southwards as the enemy approached from the north. He finally arrived in Singapore and joined the Medical Team there. But soon the whole family had to abandon the Bukit Timah rambutan estate as the enemy approached. They moved to the Prinsep Street Presbyterian Church where they took refuge under the church pews, together with many others. Bombing and cannon fire continued all day and night from across the causeway. Singapore surrendered and the Japanese soldiers were everywhere. All non-Singaporeans were returned to Malaya. Lim Swee Aun and his family travelled in a cattle wagon, taking 4 days and 3 nights to reach Taiping.

=== Japanese occupation 1942-1945 ===
Dr. Lim Swee Aun worked for Dr. Tan Chen Leng in Taiping. During the occupation period, Lim Swee Aun secretly supplied medicine to the Prisoners of War. Dr. Lim Swee Aun, Dr. Tan Cheng Leng and the Parsi Jal Manecksha also secretly helped the Indian Prisoners of War of the Motor Transport Unit No. 1 under the Command of Subedar Nurud Din. They contributed a sum of $15,000/- to Dr. Tarlok Singh to help them buy medicine and food for the sick Indian prisoners of war. They had also been using a radio to listen to the Allied news, each time dismantling the radio and hiding it away after listening. They were part of the "inner circle of war news." He kept this secret, even from his wife. After the war, Lim Swee Aun was awarded by the British Government through Malcolm McDonald a commendation certificate for his deeds.

=== British Military Administration (BMA) ===
After the Japanese surrender on 2 September 1945, Lim Swee Aun resigned from Dr. Tan Chen Leng's employment and started his own practice at 75 Kota Road, Taiping, Perak. He had to raise money to buy the premises by pawning jewellery of his mother and wife. He worked hard, day and night attending to his sick patients and doing house calls even though the country was in a state of Malayan Emergency from the communist activities. He often treated his patients for free when they could not afford it.

== Political career ==
He was a founder and life member of the Malaysian Chinese Association in Taiping. In 1959, Lim Swee Aun successfully stood for Parliament for Larut Selatan. He was appointed Minister of Health in 1962 and later in the year he became Minister of Commerce and Industry.

=== Industrialisation ===
Lim Swee Aun's responsibility as minister was to industrialise the country. He encouraged Foreign investments in joint ventures but stood firm on the 51% Malaysian participation. Industrial estates were established throughout the country from Perlis in the north to Johore in the south.

The seeds of what was to become a major industry in Malaysia were sown by the then Malaysian Minister of Commerce and Industry, Dr. Lim Swee Aun, in 1963. On his way to the General Agreement on Tariffs and Trade Conference (GATT) Geneva that year, Dr. Lim confirmed that his ministry had received many inquiries from foreign and local firms regarding the possibility of setting up vehicle manufacturing factories in the Federation. The bigger plan, he subsequently announced, was to establish a motor vehicle industry in Malaysia by stages - from basic assembly with local content, to chassis build and finally to a fully locally made car. It would be exactly 20 years later that Perusahaan Otomobile Nasional Berhad (Proton (carmaker)) was incorporated (7 May 1983), and Malaysia's first locally built car, the Proton Saga, was launched on 9 July 1985.

=== Formation of Malaysia Agreement 1963 ===
Lim Swee Aun was involved in the final rounds of negotiations on the Malaysia talks. A Malayan delegation departed for London on 25 June 1963 and was led by Tun Abdul Razak, Tan Siew Sin and Dr Lim Swee Aun (Minister for Commerce).

The function of Mr. Tan and Dr. Lim was in Sir Geofroy Tory's view, to restrain Tun Razak from making undue concessions. Agreement was reached on the main points of issue on 5 July and only then did Tunku himself leave for London. Dr. Lim was one of the signatories of the Agreement Relating to Malaysia (1963).

=== The Debate on Malaysian Solidarity 1965 ===
Syed Jaafar Albar participated in verbal duels with the Singaporean Prime Minister, Lee Kuan Yew, over the issue of ketuanan Melayu (Malay sovereignty over Malaysia), accusing Lee and some other Chinese Malaysians—referring to them as kaum pendatang or immigrants—of being lodgers (orang tumpangan), abusing the hospitality of the Malays who were the "masters of the house".
This provoked a response from Cabinet member Swee Aun, who insisted "we are co-owners, not lodgers, not guests."
Prime Minister Lee Kuan Yew in his speech at the Malaysia Solidarity Convention on 6 June 1965 congratulated Lim Swee Aun for his courage in saying it.

== Timeline ==
- 1915 Sep Born, Taiping, Perak, Malaya
- 1938 Graduated Licentiate of Medicine & Surgery
- 1948-1950 Nominated Taiping Town Council
- 1949 Jan Justice of Peace, Perak
- 1953-1955 Member Perak State legislative Council
- 1959 Aug Elected Member of Parliament Larut Selatan
- 1962 Aug Appointed Minister of Health
- 1962 Oct Appointed Minister of Commerce & Industry
- 1963 Mar Attended ECAFE Conference in Manila
- 1963 Jun Took active part in Malaysia negotiations in London
- 1963 Nov Charman, Commonwealth Parliamentary Association Conference, Kuala Lumpur
- 1964 Nov Leader Malaysian delegation to Commonwealth Parliamentary Conference Trinidad, Jamaica
- 1965 Mar Leader Malaysian delegation to ECAFE, New Zealand

== Election results ==
Parliament of the Federation of Malaya
Year	Constituency	Candidate	Votes	Pct	Opponent(s)	Votes	Pct	Ballots cast	Majority	Turnout
1959	P043 Larut Selatan	Lim Swee Aun (MCA)	11,218	54.11%	C. H. Yin (PPP)	6,444	31.08%	20,881	4,774	63.99%
1959	P043 Larut Selatan	Lim Swee Aun (MCA)	11,218	54.11%	Md Yunus Md Hashim (PMIP)	3,071	14.81%	20,881	4,774	63.99%

Parliament of Malaysia
Year	Constituency	Candidate	Votes	Pct	Opponent(s)	Votes	Pct	Ballots cast	Majority	Turnout
1964	P043 Larut Selatan	Lim Swee Aun (MCA)	18,906	63.22%	Lim Eng Chuan (UDP)	5,080	16.99%	31,029	13,826	75.85%
1964	P043 Larut Selatan	Lim Swee Aun (MCA)	18,906	63.22%	Othman Abdullah (PRM)	3,185	10.65%	31,029	13,826	75.85%
1964	P043 Larut Selatan	Lim Swee Aun (MCA)	18,906	63.22%	Abdul Rahman Abdul Hamid (PMIP)	2,734	9.14%	31,029	13,826	75.85%
1969	P043 Larut Selatan	Lim Swee Aun (MCA)	10,774	34.34%	Ng Hoe Hun (Gerakan)	15,641	49.85%	32,610	4,867	68.69%
1969	P043 Larut Selatan	Lim Swee Aun (MCA)	10,774	34.34%	Md Tahir Abdul Rauf (PMIP)	4,962	15.81%	32,610	4,867	68.69%

== Honours ==
=== Honours of Malaysia ===
- Malaysia
  - Recipient of the Malaysian Commemorative Medal (Gold) (PPM) (1965)
  - Commander of the Order of the Defender of the Realm (PMN) – Tan Sri (1968)

=== Foreign Honours ===
- Belgium
  - Grand Cross of the Order of Leopold II (1967)
