= Ministry of Internal Security (Malaysia) =

Malaysian federal government ministry

- Kementerian Keselamatan Dalam Negeri (KKDN)
- The logo of Ministry of Internal Security

Agency overview
- Formed: 18 March 2004
- Dissolved: 18 March 2008
- Superseding agency: Ministry of Home Affairs
- Jurisdiction: Government of Malaysia
- Website: kkdn.gov.my

Ministry of Internal Security (Malay: Kementerian Keselamatan Dalam Negeri), abbreviated KKDN, was a Malaysian federal government ministry.

== History ==
This ministry was established in March 2004 by dividing the Home Ministry into two ministries, namely Ministry of Internal Security and Ministry of Home Affairs.

Ministry of Internal Security was led by the former Prime Minister of Malaysia, Tun Abdullah Ahmad Badawi and was supported by two Deputy Ministers. Secretary-General (Sec-Gen) KKDN who was aided by two Deputy Secretaries General (Sec-Gen), was responsible for five respective parts presided by a Secretary Part. On the other hand, each Secretary (Management) had eight parts under him/her. Three more departments were directly accountable to Sec-Gen.

== Departmental structure ==
This department had four departments / agency:

- Royal Malaysia Police (PDRM)
- National Anti-Drug Agency (AADK)
- Malaysian Prison Department
- Malaysian Civil Defence Department

On 18 March 2008, a new cabinet was announced and the Ministry of Internal Security was again incorporated into the Ministry of Home Affairs.
