= Bahaman Samsudin =

Bahaman Samsudin, also known as Dato’ Seri Utama Bahaman Shamsuddin, was a Malaysian politician. He served as Malaysian government minister (1957–1969) and Member of Parliament for Kuala Pilah representing UMNO. Prior to that, he was entrusted by Tunku Abdul Rahman to contest the Hilir Perak parliamentary seat in the 1955 Malayan General Election. While serving as the District Officer (DO) of Kuala Pilah, the British authorities reassigned him to Teluk Intan.

== Cabinet career ==
He served as Minister of Natural Resources in the cabinet of Tunku Abdul Rahman in 1957. The appointment was announced on 28 August 1957 by Tunku Abdul Rahman, the Chief Minister of the Federation of Malaya. Bahaman also served as President of the St Paul Institution Alumni Association in Seremban (1949–1953), during which time he was the District Officer of Seremban.

On 9 August 1955, he was appointed Deputy Minister of Home Affairs and Justice. From 31 August 1957 to 16 November 1959, he was tasked with overseeing FELDA affairs. In 1963, he became Minister of Labour and once welcomed a Brunei delegation in Kuala Lumpur. He also attended an event at the Workers’ Training Centre in Port Dickson in 1959.

He later served as Minister of Health. The foundation stone of Hospital Tuanku Jaafar was laid by Bahaman bin Samsudin, Minister of Health, on 5 November 1966. In the same year, he attended a lecture at the Institute for Medical Research, Jalan Pahang, Kuala Lumpur.

On 6 February 1969, in his capacity as Minister of Justice, Bahaman informed Parliament that there had been 22,450 suicide cases and 213 attempted suicides. During the session, Tuan Haji Abu Bakar Hamzah (Bachok) requested clarification regarding the suicide case of Haji Sharif, the head of the UMNO Klang branch.

== 1959 General Election ==
As a Perikatan/UMNO politician, he won the 1959 Federation of Malaya General Election for the Kuala Pilah constituency in the state of Negeri Sembilan, serving from 1958 to 1964.

At that time, the Chief Minister of the Federation of Malaya was Tunku Abdul Rahman, with Tun Abdul Razak Hussein as his deputy. This election was the first general election after independence on 31 August 1957. The 1959 Malayan General Election was significant as it was conducted in stages, beginning from Perlis and ending in Kelantan. Malaysia had not yet been formed at that time. The number of parliamentary seats increased from 52 seats (1955) to 104 seats (1959). Perikatan won 74 seats, while the opposition secured 30 seats.
