= Minister of Investment, Trade and Industry (Malaysia) =

Minister in the Government of Malaysia

- Menteri Pelaburan, Perdagangan dan Industri منتري ڤلابوران ڤرداݢڠن دان اندوستري
- Coat of arms of Malaysia
- Incumbent; Johari Abdul Ghani since 17 December 2025
- Ministry of Investment, Trade and Industry
- Style: The Honourable Minister
- Abbreviation: MITI
- Member of: Cabinet of Malaysia
- Reports to: Parliament of Malaysia
- Seat: Kuala Lumpur
- Appointer: Yang di-Pertuan Agong on the advice of the Prime Minister
- Formation: 31 August 1957
- First holder: Tan Siew Sin as Minister of Commerce and Industry
- Deputy: Sim Tze Tzin
- Website: www.miti.gov.my

The Minister of Investment, Trade and Industry (Malay: Menteri Pelaburan, Perdagangan dan Industri; Jawi: منتري ڤلابوران ڤرداݢڠن دان اندوستري), is a minister in the Government of Malaysia, with responsibility for the Ministry of Investment, Trade and Industry (MITI).

The current minister is Johari Abdul Ghani, who was appointed by Anwar Ibrahim on 17 December 2025.

== List of ministers ==
=== Investment ===
The following individuals have been appointed as Minister of Investment, or any of its precedent titles:

Political party: BN PH

Portrait	Name (Birth–Death) Constituency	Political party	Title	Took office	Left office	Deputy Minister	Prime Minister (Cabinet)
	Tengku Zafrul Aziz (b. 1973); Senator	BN (UMNO)	Minister of Investment, Trade and Industry	5 April 2023	30 May 2025	Liew Chin Tong	Anwar Ibrahim (I)
	Tengku Zafrul Aziz (b. 1973); Senator	PH (PKR)	Minister of Investment, Trade and Industry	30 May 2025	2 December 2025	Liew Chin Tong	Anwar Ibrahim (I)
	Johari Abdul Ghani (b. 1964); MP for Titiwangsa	BN (UMNO)	Minister of Investment, Trade and Industry	17 December 2025	Incumbent	Sim Tze Tzin	Anwar Ibrahim (I)

=== International trade ===
The following individuals have been appointed as Minister of International Trade, or any of its precedent titles:

Political party: Alliance/BN WARISAN (allied with PH) PN

Portrait	Name (Birth–Death) Constituency	Political party	Title	Took office	Left office	Deputy Minister	Prime Minister (Cabinet)
	Rafidah Aziz (b. 1943); MP for Kuala Kangsar	BN (UMNO)	Minister of International Trade and Industry	27 October 1990	17 March 2008	Chua Jui Meng (1990–1995); Kerk Choo Ting (1995–2004); Ahmad Husni Hanadzlah (2004–2008); Mah Siew Keong (2004–2006); Ng Lip Yong (2006–2008)	Mahathir Mohamad (IV • V • VI); Abdullah Ahmad Badawi (I • II)
	Muhyiddin Yassin (b. 1947); MP for Pagoh	BN (UMNO)	Minister of International Trade and Industry	18 March 2008	9 April 2009	Liew Vui Keong (2008–2009); Jacob Dungau Sagan (2008–2009)	Abdullah Ahmad Badawi (III)
	Mustapa Mohamed (b. 1950); MP for Jeli	BN (UMNO)	Minister of International Trade and Industry	9 April 2009	9 May 2018	Mukhriz Mahathir (2009–2013); Jacob Dungau Sagan (2009–2013); Hamim Samuri (2013–2015); Lee Chee Leong (2014–2016); Ahmad Maslan (2015–2018); Chua Tee Yong (2016–2018)	Najib Razak (I · II)
	Ong Ka Chuan (b. 1954); MP for Tanjong Malim	BN (MCA)	Second Minister of International Trade and Industry	29 July 2015	9 May 2018	Lee Chee Leong (2015–2016); Ahmad Maslan (2015–2018); Chua Tee Yong (2016–2018)	Najib Razak (II)
	Darell Leiking (b. 1971); MP for Penampang	WARISAN	Minister of International Trade and Industry	2 July 2018	24 February 2020	Ong Kian Ming	Mahathir Mohamad (VII)
	Mohamed Azmin Ali (b. 1964) (Senior Minister); MP for Gombak	PN (BERSATU)	Senior Minister of International Trade and Industry	10 March 2020	24 November 2022	Lim Ban Hong	Muhyiddin Yassin (I); Ismail Sabri Yaakob (I)
	Tengku Zafrul Aziz (b. 1973); Senator	BN (UMNO)	Minister of International Trade and Industry	3 December 2022	5 April 2023	Liew Chin Tong	Anwar Ibrahim (I)

=== Trade ===
The following individuals have been appointed as Minister of Trade, or any of its precedent titles:

Political party: Alliance/BN PH

Portrait	Name (Birth–Death) Constituency	Political party	Title	Took office	Left office	Deputy Minister	Prime Minister (Cabinet)
	Tan Siew Sin (1916–1988); MP for Malacca Central	Alliance (MCA)	Minister of Trade and Industry	31 August 1957	21 January 1959	Vacant	Tunku Abdul Rahman (I)
	Ismail Abdul Rahman (1915–1973) (Deputy Prime Minister); MP for Johore Timor	Alliance (UMNO)	Minister of Trade and Industry	3 January 1973	12 August 1973	Musa Hitam	Abdul Razak Hussein (I)
	Hussein Onn (1922–1990) (Deputy Prime Minister); MP for Johore Bahru Timor	BN (UMNO)	Minister of Trade and Industry	13 August 1973	14 September 1974	Musa Hitam	Abdul Razak Hussein (I)
	Hamzah Abu Samah (1924–2012); MP for Temerloh	BN (UMNO)	Minister of Trade and Industry	15 September 1974	31 December 1977	Vacant (1974–1976); Mohamed Rahmat (1976–1977)	Abdul Razak Hussein (II); Hussein Onn (I)
	Mahathir Mohamad (b. 1925) (Deputy Prime Minister); MP for Kubang Pasu	BN (UMNO)	Minister of Trade and Industry	1 January 1978	16 July 1981	Lew Sip Hon	Hussein Onn (I · II)
	Tengku Ahmad Rithauddeen Tengku Ismail (b. 1932); MP for Kota Bharu	BN (UMNO)	Minister of Trade and Industry	17 July 1981	16 July 1984	Lew Sip Hon (1981–1983); Shahrir Abdul Samad (1981–1983); Oo Gin Sun (1983–1984); Muhyiddin Yassin (1983–1984)	Mahathir Mohamad (I · II)
	Tengku Razaleigh Hamzah (b. 1937); MP for Ulu Kelantan (1984-1986); MP for Gua Musang (1986-1987)	BN (UMNO)	Minister of Trade and Industry	17 July 1984	28 April 1987	Oo Gin Sun (1984–1986); Muhyiddin Yassin (1984–1986); Oo Gin Sun (1983–1984); Kee Yong Wee (1986); Kok Wee Kiat (1986–1987)	Mahathir Mohamad (II · III)
	Rafidah Aziz (b. 1943); MP for Kuala Kangsar	BN (UMNO)	Minister of Trade and Industry	20 May 1987	27 October 1990	Kok Wee Kiat	Mahathir Mohamad (III)
	Tengku Zafrul Aziz (b. 1973); Senator	BN (UMNO)	Minister of Investment, Trade and Industry	5 April 2023	30 May 2025	Liew Chin Tong	Anwar Ibrahim (I)
	Tengku Zafrul Aziz (b. 1973); Senator	PH (PKR)	Minister of Investment, Trade and Industry	30 May 2025	2 December 2025	Liew Chin Tong	Anwar Ibrahim (I)
	Johari Abdul Ghani (b. 1964); MP for Titiwangsa	BN (UMNO)	Minister of Investment, Trade and Industry	17 December 2025	Incumbent	Sim Tze Tzin	Anwar Ibrahim (I)

=== Industry ===
The following individuals have been appointed as Minister of Industry, or any of its precedent titles:

Political party: Alliance/BN WARISAN (allied with PH) PN PH

Portrait	Name (Birth–Death) Constituency	Political party	Title	Took office	Left office	Deputy Minister	Prime Minister (Cabinet)
	Tan Siew Sin (1916–1988); MP for Malacca Central	Alliance (MCA)	Minister of Trade and Industry	31 August 1957	21 January 1959	Vacant	Tunku Abdul Rahman (I)
	Ismail Abdul Rahman (1915–1973); MP for Johore Timor	Alliance (UMNO)	Minister of Commerce and Industry	20 September 1959	17 November 1959	Vacant	Tunku Abdul Rahman (II)
	Khir Johari (1923–2006); MP for Kedah Tengah	Alliance (UMNO)	Minister of Commerce and Industry	18 November 1959	9 October 1962	Vacant	Tunku Abdul Rahman (II)
	Lim Swee Aun (1915–1977); MP for Larut Selatan	Alliance (MCA)	Minister of Commerce and Industry	10 October 1962	3 June 1969	Vacant	Tunku Abdul Rahman (II · III)
	Ismail Abdul Rahman (1915–1973); MP for Johore Timor	Alliance (UMNO)	Minister of Trade and Industry	3 January 1973	12 August 1973	Musa Hitam	Abdul Razak Hussein (I)
	Hussein Onn (1922–1990) (Deputy Prime Minister); MP for Johore Bahru Timor	BN (UMNO)	Minister of Trade and Industry	13 August 1973	14 September 1974	Musa Hitam	Abdul Razak Hussein (I)
	Hamzah Abu Samah (1924–2012); MP for Temerloh	BN (UMNO)	Minister of Trade and Industry	15 September 1974	31 December 1977	Vacant (1974–1976); Mohamed Rahmat (1976–1977)	Abdul Razak Hussein (II); Hussein Onn (I)
	Mahathir Mohamad (b. 1925) (Deputy Prime Minister); MP for Kubang Pasu	BN (UMNO)	Minister of Trade and Industry	1 January 1978	16 July 1981	Lew Sip Hon	Hussein Onn (I · II)
	Tengku Ahmad Rithauddeen Tengku Ismail (b. 1932); MP for Kota Bharu	BN (UMNO)	Minister of Trade and Industry	17 July 1981	16 July 1984	Lew Sip Hon (1981–1983); Shahrir Abdul Samad (1981–1983); Oo Gin Sun (1983–1984); Muhyiddin Yassin (1983–1984)	Mahathir Mohamad (I · II)
	Tengku Razaleigh Hamzah (b. 1937); MP for Ulu Kelantan (1984-1986); MP for Gua Musang (1986-1987)	BN (UMNO)	Minister of Trade and Industry	17 July 1984	28 April 1987	Oo Gin Sun (1984–1986); Muhyiddin Yassin (1984–1986); Oo Gin Sun (1983–1984); Kee Yong Wee (1986); Kok Wee Kiat (1986–1987)	Mahathir Mohamad (II · III)
	Rafidah Aziz (b. 1943); MP for Kuala Kangsar	BN (UMNO)	Minister of Trade and Industry	20 May 1987	27 October 1990	Kok Wee Kiat (1986–1990); Chua Jui Meng (1990–1995); Kerk Choo Ting (1995–2004); Ahmad Husni Hanadzlah (2004–2008); Mah Siew Keong (2004–2006); Ng Lip Yong (2006–2008)	Mahathir Mohamad (III • IV • V • VI); Abdullah Ahmad Badawi (I • II)
	Rafidah Aziz (b. 1943); MP for Kuala Kangsar	BN (UMNO)	Minister of International Trade and Industry	27 October 1990	17 March 2008	Kok Wee Kiat (1986–1990); Chua Jui Meng (1990–1995); Kerk Choo Ting (1995–2004); Ahmad Husni Hanadzlah (2004–2008); Mah Siew Keong (2004–2006); Ng Lip Yong (2006–2008)	Mahathir Mohamad (III • IV • V • VI); Abdullah Ahmad Badawi (I • II)
	Muhyiddin Yassin (b. 1947); MP for Pagoh	BN (UMNO)	Minister of International Trade and Industry	18 March 2008	9 April 2009	Liew Vui Keong (2008–2009); Jacob Dungau Sagan (2008–2009)	Abdullah Ahmad Badawi (III)
	Mustapa Mohamed (b. 1950); MP for Jeli	BN (UMNO)	Minister of International Trade and Industry	9 April 2009	9 May 2018	Mukhriz Mahathir (2009–2013); Jacob Dungau Sagan (2009–2013); Hamim Samuri (2013–2015); Lee Chee Leong (2014–2016); Ahmad Maslan (2015–2018); Chua Tee Yong (2016–2018)	Najib Razak (I · II)
	Ong Ka Chuan (b. 1954); MP for Tanjong Malim	BN (MCA)	Second Minister of International Trade and Industry	29 July 2015	9 May 2018	Lee Chee Leong (2015–2016); Ahmad Maslan (2015–2018); Chua Tee Yong (2016–2018)	Najib Razak (II)
	Darell Leiking (b. 1971); MP for Penampang	WARISAN	Minister of International Trade and Industry	2 July 2018	24 February 2020	Ong Kian Ming	Mahathir Mohamad (I)
	Mohamed Azmin Ali (b. 1964) (Senior Minister); MP for Gombak	PN (BERSATU)	Senior Minister of International Trade and Industry	10 March 2020	24 November 2022	Lim Ban Hong	Muhyiddin Yassin (I); Ismail Sabri Yaakob (I)
	Tengku Zafrul Aziz (b. 1973); Senator	BN (UMNO)	Minister of International Trade and Industry	3 December 2022	5 April 2023	Liew Chin Tong	Anwar Ibrahim (I)
	Tengku Zafrul Aziz (b. 1973); Senator	BN (UMNO)	Minister of Investment, Trade and Industry	5 April 2023	30 May 2025	Liew Chin Tong	Anwar Ibrahim (I)
	Tengku Zafrul Aziz (b. 1973); Senator	PH (PKR)	Minister of Investment, Trade and Industry	30 May 2025	2 December 2025	Liew Chin Tong	Anwar Ibrahim (I)
	Johari Abdul Ghani (b. 1964); MP for Titiwangsa	BN (UMNO)	Minister of Investment, Trade and Industry	17 December 2025	Incumbent	Sim Tze Tzin	Anwar Ibrahim (I)
