= Fourth Rahman cabinet =

- 4th Cabinet of Malaysia

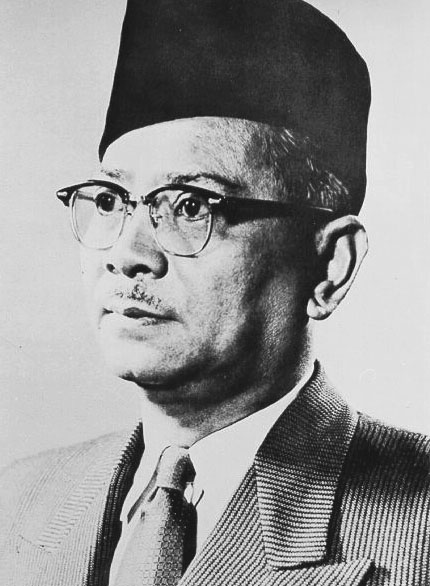

People and organisations
- Head of state: Tuanku Ismail Nasiruddin Shah (1969–1970) Tuanku Abdul Halim (1970)
- Head of government: Tunku Abdul Rahman
- Deputy head of government: Abdul Razak Hussein
- Member parties: Alliance Party: United Malays National Organisation; Malaysian Chinese Association; Parti Bumiputera Sarawak; Malaysian Indian Congress; Sarawak Chinese Association
- Status in legislature: Coalition government
- Opposition parties: Democratic Action Party; United Sabah National Organisation; Pan-Malayan Islamic Party; Sarawak National Party; Malaysian People's Movement Party; Sarawak United Peoples' Party; People's Progressive Party; Sabah Chinese Association; Parti Pesaka Sarawak
- Opposition leader: None

History
- Election: 1969 Malaysian general election
- Legislature term: 3rd Malaysian Parliament
- Budget: 1970
- Predecessor: Third Rahman cabinet
- Successor: First Razak cabinet

This article is about the fourth cabinet of the first Prime Minister of Malaysia, Tunku Abdul Rahman. He announced his cabinet on 21 May 1969, eight days after the 13 May incident, and eleven days after the 1969 Malaysian general election, where his Alliance only won by a slim majority. It was the 4th cabinet of Malaysia formed since independence. This was the final government headed by Tunku Abdul Rahman, although in reality the government was suspended and de facto replaced by National Operations Council or MAGERAN on 15 May. Tunku Abdul Rahman resigned from his position a year later, succeeded by his deputy and the MAGERAN director, Abdul Razak Hussein.

== Composition ==
=== Full members ===
The federal cabinet consisted of the following ministers:

Portfolio	Office bearer	Party	Constituency	Term start	Term end
Prime Minister	Tunku Abdul Rahman MP	UMNO	Kuala Kedah		
Minister of External Affairs	Tunku Abdul Rahman MP	UMNO	Kuala Kedah		
Deputy Prime Minister	Abdul Razak Hussein MP	UMNO	Pekan		
Minister of Defence	Abdul Razak Hussein MP	UMNO	Pekan		
Minister of National and Rural Development	Abdul Razak Hussein MP	UMNO	Pekan		
Minister of Finance	Tan Siew Sin MP	MCA	Malacca Tengah		
Minister of Home Affairs	Ismail Abdul Rahman MP	UMNO	Johore Timor		
Minister of Works, Posts and Telecommunications	V. T. Sambanthan MP	MIC	Sungei Siput		
Minister of Transport	V. Manickavasagam MP	MIC	Klang		
Minister of Information and Broadcasting	Hamzah Abu Samah MP	UMNO	Raub		
Minister of Culture, Youth and Sports	Hamzah Abu Samah MP	UMNO	Raub		
Minister of Education	Abdul Rahman Ya'kub MP	BUMIPUTERA	Payang		
Minister of Justice	Abdul Ghani Gilong MP	USNO	Kinabalu		
Minister of Health	Sardon Jubir MP	UMNO	Pontian Utara		

=== Assistant ministers ===
Portfolio	Office bearer	Party	Constituency	Term start	Term end
Assistant Minister of Defence	Musa Hitam MP	UMNO	Segamat Utara		
Assistant Minister of Finance	Ali Ahmad MP	UMNO	Pontian Selatan		
Assistant Minister of Culture, Youth and Sports	Engku Muhsein Abdul Kadir MP	UMNO	Terengganu Tengah		
Assistant Minister of Commerce and Industry	Abdul Taib Mahmud MP	BUMIPUTERA	Samarahan		
Assistant Minister of National and Rural Development	Abdul Samad Idris MP	UMNO	Kuala Pilah		
Assistant Minister of Special Functions	Lee San Choon MP	MCA	Segamat Selatan		

== See also ==
- Members of the Dewan Rakyat, 3rd Malaysian Parliament
- National Operations Council
