= Malacca Tengah =

Malacca constituency

Defunct federal constituency
- Legislature: Dewan Rakyat
- Constituency created: 1958
- Constituency abolished: 1974
- First contested: 1959
- Last contested: 1969

Malacca Tengah was a federal constituency in Malacca, Malaysia, that was represented in the Dewan Rakyat from 1959 to 1974.

The federal constituency was created in the 1974 redistribution and was mandated to return a single member to the Dewan Rakyat under the first past the post voting system.

== History ==
It was abolished in 1974 when it was redistributed.

=== Representation history ===
Members of Parliament for Malacca Tengah
Parliament	No	Years	Member	Party	Vote Share
Constituency created from Malacca Central
Parliament of the Federation of Malaya
1st	P085	1959-1963	Tan Siew Sin (陈修信)	Alliance (MCA)	13,635; 74.55%
Parliament of Malaysia
1st	P085	1963-1964	Tan Siew Sin (陈修信)	Alliance (MCA)	13,635; 74.55%
2nd	P085	1964-1969	Tan Siew Sin (陈修信)	Alliance (MCA)	18,658; 74.14%
		1969-1971	Parliament was suspended		
3rd	P085	1971-1973	Tan Siew Sin (陈修信)	Alliance (MCA)	13,790; 52.15%
3rd	P085	1973-1974	Tan Siew Sin (陈修信)	BN (MCA)	13,790; 52.15%
Constituency abolished, split into Batu Berendam and Kota Melaka

=== State constituency ===
Parliamentary constituency	State constituency						
Parliamentary constituency	1955–59*	1959–1974	1974–1986	1986–1995	1995–2004	2004–2018	2018–present
Malacca Tengah		Batu Berendam					
Malacca Tengah		Bukit Rambai					
Malacca Tengah		Kandang					
Malacca Tengah		Semabok					
Malacca Tengah		Tanjong Kling					

=== Historical boundaries ===
State Constituency	Area
State Constituency	1959
Batu Berendam	Cheng; Krubong; Malim; Paya Rumput; Tanjung Minyak
Bukit Rambai	Batang Tiga; Bukit Rambai; Klebang; Pulau Gadong; Taman Pokok Mangga
Kandang	Ayer Molek; Bukit Lintang; Bukit Nibong; Kandang; Telok Mas
Semabok	Ayer Keroh; Bukit Beruang; Bukit Katil; Duyong; Padang Temu
Tanjong Kling	Kampung Tanah Merah Jaya; Pantai Puteri; Sungai Udang; Tangga Batu; Tanjong Kling

== Election results ==
Malaysian general election, 1969: Malacca Tengah
Party	Candidate	Votes	%	∆%
Alliance	Tan Siew Sin	13,790	52.15	▼21.99
Parti Rakyat Malaysia	Kampo Radjo	6,490	24.55	▲24.55
PMIP	Mohamed Kamal Sudin	6,161	23.30	▲18.36
Total valid votes		26,441	100.00	
Total rejected ballots		1,620		
Unreturned ballots		0		
Turnout		28,061	78.79	▼5.50
Registered electors		35,617		
Majority		7,300	27.60	▼25.61
Alliance hold		Swing		

Malaysian general election, 1964: Malacca Tengah
Party	Candidate	Votes	%	∆%
Alliance	Tan Siew Sin	18,568	74.14	▼0.41
Socialist Front	Hasnul Abdul Hadi	5,241	20.93	▲20.93
PMIP	Mohamed Kamal Sudin	1,236	4.94	▼20.51
Total valid votes		25,045	100.00	
Total rejected ballots		721		
Unreturned ballots		0		
Turnout		25,766	84.29	▲5.65
Registered electors		30,569		
Majority		13,327	53.21	▲4.11
Alliance hold		Swing		

Malayan general election, 1959: Malacca Tengah
Party	Candidate	Votes	%
Alliance	Tan Siew Sin	13,635	74.55
PMIP	Abdul Majid Hussin	4,655	25.45
Total valid votes		18,290	100.00
Total rejected ballots		187	
Unreturned ballots		0	
Turnout		18,477	78.64
Registered electors		23,495	
Majority		8,980	49.10
This was a new constituency created.
