= Pontian Utara =

Johor constituency

Defunct federal constituency
- Legislature: Dewan Rakyat
- Constituency created: 1958
- Constituency abolished: 1974
- First contested: 1959
- Last contested: 1969

Pontian Utara was a federal constituency in Johor, Malaysia, that was represented in the Dewan Rakyat from 1959 to 1974.

The federal constituency was created in the 1974 redistribution and was mandated to return a single member to the Dewan Rakyat under the first past the post voting system.

== History ==
It was abolished in 1974 when it was redistributed.

=== Representation history ===
Members of Parliament for Pontian Utara
Parliament	No	Years	Member	Party	Vote Share
Constituency split from Johore Selatan
Parliament of the Federation of Malaya
1st	P097	1959-1963	Sardon Jubir (سعدون زبير)	Alliance (UMNO)	11,850; 68.08%
Parliament of Malaysia
1st	P097	1963-1964	Sardon Jubir (سعدون زبير)	Alliance (UMNO)	11,850; 68.08%
2nd	P097	1964-1969	Sardon Jubir (سعدون زبير)	Alliance (UMNO)	16,526; 85.67%
		1969-1971	Parliament was suspended		
3rd	P097	1971-1973	Sardon Jubir (سعدون زبير)	Alliance (UMNO)	15,000; 73.12%
3rd	P097	1973-1974	Sardon Jubir (سعدون زبير)	BN (UMNO)	15,000; 73.12%
Constituency abolished, split into Pontian, Sri Gading and Batu Pahat

=== State constituency ===
Parliamentary constituency	State constituency						
Parliamentary constituency	1954–59*	1959–1974	1974–1986	1986–1995	1995–2004	2004–2018	2018–present
Pontian Utara		Benut					
Pontian Utara		Rengit					

=== Historical boundaries ===
State Constituency	Area
State Constituency	1959
Benut	Ayer Baloi; Benut; Kampung Puter Menangis; Parit Haji Omar Lapis; Sanglang
Rengit	Kampung Belahan Tampok; Kampung Perpat Dalam; Kampung Simpang Enam; Parit Kemang; Rengit

== Election results ==
Malaysian general election, 1969: Pontian Utara
Party	Candidate	Votes	%	∆%
Alliance	Sardon Jubir	15,000	73.12	▼12.55
PMIP	Yusoff Hakingak	5,514	26.88	▲12.55
Total valid votes		20,514	100.00	
Total rejected ballots		1,882		
Unreturned ballots		0		
Turnout		22,396	75.50	▼6.19
Registered electors		29,663		
Majority		9,486	46.24	▼25.10
Alliance hold		Swing		

Malaysian general election, 1964: Pontian Utara
Party	Candidate	Votes	%	∆%
Alliance	Sardon Jubir	16,526	85.67	▲17.59
PMIP	Abdul Jamil Suleiman	2,764	14.33	▲5.33
Total valid votes		19,290	100.00	
Total rejected ballots		2,030		
Unreturned ballots		0		
Turnout		21,320	81.69	▲2.73
Registered electors		26,098		
Majority		13,762	71.34	▲26.18
Alliance hold		Swing		

Malayan general election, 1959: Pontian Utara
Party	Candidate	Votes	%
Alliance	Sardon Jubir	11,850	68.08
National Party	Garieb Abdul Raouf	3,990	22.92
PMIP	Abdul Jamil Suleiman	1,567	9.00
Total valid votes		17,407	100.00
Total rejected ballots		234	
Unreturned ballots		0	
Turnout		17,641	78.96
Registered electors		22,341	
Majority		7,860	45.16
This was a new constituency created.
