= Larut Selatan =

Perak constituency

Defunct federal constituency
- Legislature: Dewan Rakyat
- Constituency created: 1958
- Constituency abolished: 1974
- First contested: 1959
- Last contested: 1969

Larut Selatan was a federal constituency in Perak, Malaysia, that was represented in the Dewan Rakyat from 1959 to 1974.

The federal constituency was created in the 1974 redistribution and was mandated to return a single member to the Dewan Rakyat under the first past the post voting system.

== History ==
It was abolished in 1974 when it was redistributed.

=== Representation history ===
Members of Parliament for Larut Selatan
Parliament	No	Years	Member	Party	Vote Share
Constituency created from Larut-Matang
Parliament of the Federation of Malaya
1st	P043	1959-1963	Lim Swee Aun (林瑞安)	Alliance (MCA)	11,218; 54.11%
Parliament of Malaysia
1st	P043	1963-1964	Lim Swee Aun (林瑞安)	Alliance (MCA)	11,218; 54.11%
2nd	P043	1964-1969	Lim Swee Aun (林瑞安)	Alliance (MCA)	18,905; 63.22%
		1969-1971	Parliament was suspended		
3rd	P043	1971-1973	Ng Hoe Hun (黄和汉)	GERAKAN	15,641; 49.85%
3rd	P043	1973-1974	Ng Hoe Hun (黄和汉)	BN (GERAKAN)	15,641; 49.85%
Constituency abolished, split into Matang and Taiping

=== State constituency ===
Parliamentary constituency	State constituency						
Parliamentary constituency	1955–59*	1959–1974	1974–1986	1986–1995	1995–2004	2004–2018	2018–present
Larut Selatan		Matang					
Larut Selatan		Taiping					

=== Historical boundaries ===
State Constituency	Area
State Constituency	1959
Matang	Aulong; Changkat Jering; Kuala Sepetang; Matang; Simpang
Taiping	Bukit Larut; Kampung Birch; Kampung Boyan; Taiping; Taman Ehsan

== Election results ==
Malaysian general election, 1969: Larut Selatan
Party	Candidate	Votes	%	∆%
GERAKAN	Ng Hoe Hun	15,641	49.85	▲49.85
Alliance	Lim Swee Aun	10,774	34.34	▼23.88
PMIP	Md Tahir Abdul Rauf	4,962	15.81	▲6.67
Total valid votes		31,377	100.00	
Total rejected ballots		1,233		
Unreturned ballots		0		
Turnout		32,610	68.69	▼7.16
Registered electors		47,472		
Majority		4,867	15.51	▼30.72
GERAKAN gain from Alliance Party (Malaysia) Party (Malaysia)		Swing		?

Malaysian general election, 1964: Larut Selatan
Party	Candidate	Votes	%	∆%
Alliance	Lim Swee Aun	18,906	63.22	▲9.11
UDP	Lim Eng Chuan	5,080	16.99	▲16.99
Socialist Front	Othman Abdullah	3,185	10.65	▲10.65
PMIP	Abdul Rahman Abdul Hamid	2,734	9.14	▲5.67
Total valid votes		29,905	100.00	
Total rejected ballots		1,124		
Unreturned ballots		0		
Turnout		31,029	75.85	▲11.86
Registered electors		40,909		
Majority		13,826	46.23	▲23.20
Alliance hold		Swing		

Malayan general election, 1959: Larut Selatan
Party	Candidate	Votes	%
Alliance	Lim Swee Aun	11,218	54.11
PPP	C. H. Yin	6,444	31.08
PMIP	Md Yunus Md Hashim	3,071	14.81
Total valid votes		20,733	100.00
Total rejected ballots		148	
Unreturned ballots		0	
Turnout		20,881	63.99
Registered electors		32,633	
Majority		4,774	23.03
This was a new constituency created.
