= Abdul Rahman Talib =

Malaysian politician (1916–1968)

Abdul Rahman Talib PJK PPM
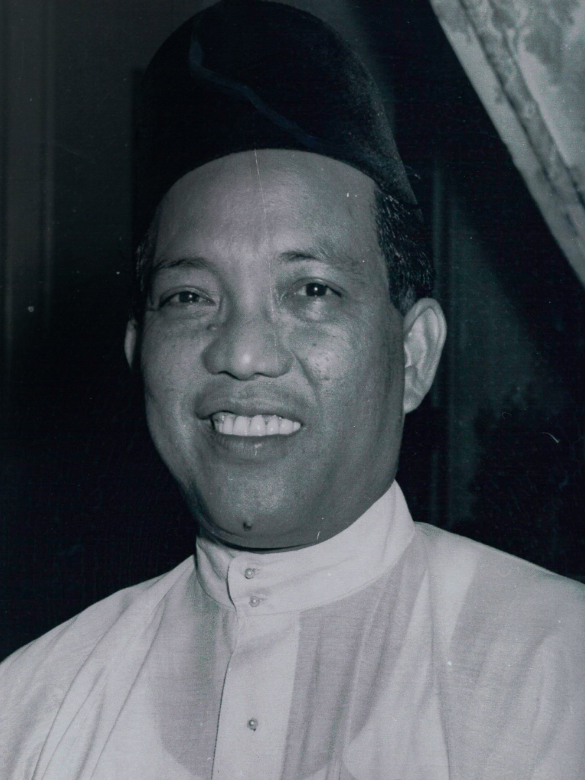

Minister of Transport
- In office 31 August 1957 – 7 October 1959
- Prime Minister: Tunku Abdul Rahman
- Preceded by: H. S. Lee
- Succeeded by: Sardon Jubir

Minister of Health
- In office 1962–1964
- Prime Minister: Tunku Abdul Rahman

Personal details
- Born: 1916 Temerloh, Pahang, Federated Malay States
- Died: 18 October 1968 (aged 51–52) Cairo, Egypt
- Party: United Malays National Organisation (UMNO)
- Other political affiliations: Alliance Party

Abdul Rahman bin Talib (1916 – 18 October 1968) was a former minister of Malaysia.

He served as minister of transport, health and education. In 1965, opposition MP DR Seenivasagam made an allegation of corruption against Abdul Rahman Talib in Parliament, and repeated it in front of a huge crowd, including Rahman, at the Chinese Assembly Hall.

Rahman sued DR for defamation but lost the case and ended up resigning as a minister.

== Elections result ==
Federal Legislative Council
Year	Constituency	Candidate	Votes	Pct	Opponent(s)	Votes	Pct	Ballots cast	Majority	Turnout
1955	Pahang Timor	Abdul Rahman Talib (UMNO)	16,763	92.62%	Sheikh Kadir Sheikh Omar (IND)	1,334	7.38%	18,536	15,429	83.15%

Parliament of the Federation of Malaya
Year	Constituency	Candidate	Votes	Pct	Opponent(s)	Votes	Pct	Ballots cast	Majority	Turnout
1959	P061 Kuantan	Abdul Rahman Talib (UMNO)	8,856	76.25%	Hamzah Dahaman (PMIP)	2,758	23.75%	11,720	6,098	70.81%

Parliament of Malaysia
Year	Constituency	Candidate	Votes	Pct	Opponent(s)	Votes	Pct	Ballots cast	Majority	Turnout
1964	P061 Kuantan	Abdul Rahman Talib (UMNO)	10,696	69.42%	Mohamed Kameil Ibrahim (PRM)	2,957	19.19%	16,118	7,739	73.64%
1964	P061 Kuantan	Abdul Rahman Talib (UMNO)	10,696	69.42%	Jamahir Idris (PMIP)	1,755	11.39%	16,118	7,739	73.64%

== Honours ==
- Malaysia
  - Recipient of the Malaysia Commemorative Medal (Silver) (PPM) (1965)
- Pahang
  - Recipient of the Meritorious Service Medal (PJK) (1959)
