= Sardon Jubir =

Malaysian politician (1917–1985)

Yang Amat Berbahagia Tun Dato' Sardon Jubir SMN SPMJ SPMK DUPN PMN
- سعدون زبير

4th Governor of Penang
- In office 2 February 1975 – 30 April 1981
- Chief Minister: Lim Chong Eu
- Preceded by: Syed Sheh Barakbah
- Succeeded by: Awang Hassan

3rd Youth Chief of the United Malays National Organisation
- In office 1951–1964
- President: Tunku Abdul Rahman
- Preceded by: Abdul Razak Hussein
- Succeeded by: Senu Abdul Rahman

Minister of Communications
- In office 1 January 1972 – 24 August 1974
- Monarch: Abdul Halim
- Prime Minister: Abdul Razak Hussein
- Deputy: Wong Seng Chow
- Preceded by: V. T. Sambanthan as Minister of Works, Posts and Telecommunications
- Succeeded by: V. Manickavasagam
- Constituency: Pontian Utara

Minister of Health
- In office 4 June 1969 – 1 January 1972
- Monarchs: Ismail Nasiruddin (1969–1970); Abdul Halim (1970–1972)
- Prime Minister: Tunku Abdul Rahman (1969–1970); Abdul Razak Hussein (1970–1972)
- Preceded by: Ng Kam Poh
- Succeeded by: Lee Siok Yew
- Constituency: Pontian Utara

Minister of Transport
- In office 22 August 1959 – 3 June 1969
- Monarchs: Abdul Rahman (1959–1960); Hisamuddin (1960); Putra (1960–1965); Ismail Nasiruddin (1965–1969)
- Prime Minister: Tunku Abdul Rahman
- Preceded by: Abdul Rahman Talib
- Succeeded by: V. Manickavasagam
- Constituency: Pontian Utara

Minister of Works, Posts and Telecommunications
- In office 31 August 1957 – 21 August 1959
- Monarch: Abdul Rahman
- Prime Minister: Tunku Abdul Rahman
- Preceded by: Himself as Minister of Works
- Succeeded by: V. T. Sambanthan
- Constituency: Segamat

Minister of Works
- In office 9 August 1955 – 31 August 1957
- Monarch: Elizabeth II
- Chief Minister: Tunku Abdul Rahman
- Assistant Minister: Abdul Khalid Awang Osman
- Preceded by: Position Established
- Succeeded by: Himself as Minister of Works, Posts and Telecommunications
- Constituency: Segamat

Member of the Legislative Council of Singapore for Rural East
- In office 1 April 1948 – 16 February 1951
- Preceded by: Constituency Established
- Succeeded by: Constituency Abolished

Personal details
- Born: 19 March 1917 Rengit, Batu Pahat, Johor, British Malaya (now Malaysia)
- Died: 14 December 1985 (aged 68) Kuala Lumpur, Malaysia
- Resting place: Makam Pahlawan, Masjid Negara, Kuala Lumpur
- Party: United Malays National Organisation (UMNO)
- Spouse: Saadiah Abdullah (m. 1944)
- Education: Victoria School; Raffles Institution
- Alma mater: Inns of Court School of Law (LLB); Inner Temple
- Occupation: Politician

Sardon bin Jubir (Jawi: سعدون بن زبير, Malay pronunciation: [sardon]; 19 March 1917 – 14 December 1985) was a Malaysian politician who had served as the 4th Governor of Penang from 1975 to 1981. Prior to his governorship, he had served as Minister of Health, Minister of Works and Communications and was the 3rd UMNO Youth Chief.

== Early life and education ==
Sardon was born in Rengit, Batu Pahat, Johor on 19 March 1917. His father, Haji Jubir bin Haji Mohd Amin was a plantation owner and a kathi in Singapore.

Sardon was educated at Victoria Bridge School and Raffles Institution in Singapore. At Raffles, he formed a Malay literary association with friends including Aziz Ishak, Abdul Hamid Jumat, and Ahmad Ibrahim and contributed articles on the Malays and their plight to Warta Malaya, a leading Malay newspaper in Singapore. This was done through Aziz's brother, Yusof Ishak who was already working as a journalist. Yusof later became the first President of Singapore.

After passing his Senior Cambridge examination, Tun Sardon pursued a career in law in London and qualified as a barrister from Lincoln's Inner Temple. He returned to Singapore in 1941 and had his practice in Singapore and later in Johor Bahru. He was called to the English Bar in 1938 at the same time as Tun Suffian Hashim who later retired as the Lord President of the Supreme Court.

== Political career ==
Tun Sardon held the post of Minister of Health until 1972. He retired from politics in 1974 and was made Ambassador to the United Nations–a post then normally associated with retired politicians. In 1975, he was appointed Yang di-Pertua Negeri of Penang.

== Personal life ==
Sardon married Toh Puan Hajjah Saadiah Abdullah in 1944. They had three sons and two adopted daughters.

== Death ==
Sardon died on 14 December 1985 and was buried at Makam Pahlawan near Masjid Negara, Kuala Lumpur.

== Legacy ==
With the support from business and community leaders from Penang, the Tun Sardon Foundation was incorporated on 13 June 1978 as a company limited by guarantee and not having a share capital under the Companies Act 1965 to carry out charitable objects, including giving relief to the poor and needy, in particular the widows and orphans, victims of fire, floods, famine or other calamity and to those in need of moral or social rehabilitation or welfare.

Several projects and institutions were named after him, including:

- Taman Tun Sardon in Gelugor, Penang
- Jalan Tun Sardon a major road from Balik Pulau to Paya Terubong
- SMK Tun Sardon in Rengit, Johor
- Bilik Mesyuarat Tun Sardon Jubir, a conference room at Pos Malaysia National Mail Centre in Shah Alam, Selangor
- Laluan Makmal Sains Tun Sardon Jubir, a science laboratory hallway in a MARA institutional boarding school, MRSM Baling, Kedah

== Honours ==
=== Honours of Malaysia ===
- Malaya
  - Commander of the Order of the Defender of the Realm (PMN) – Tan Sri (1961)
- Malaysia
  - Grand Commander of the Order of the Defender of the Realm (SMN) – Tun (1976)
  - Recipient of the Malaysian Commemorative Medal (Gold) (PPM) (1965)
- Johor
  - Knight Grand Commander of the Order of the Crown of Johor (SPMJ) – Dato' (1972)
- Kelantan
  - Knight Grand Commander of the Order of the Crown of Kelantan (SPMK) – Dato' (1972)
- Penang
  - Knight Grand Commander (DUPN) with title Dato' Seri Utama
  - Grand Master of the Order of the Defender of State

=== Foreign Honours ===
- Belgium
  - Grand Cross of the Order of Leopold II (1967)

Preceded by Syed Sheh Hassan Barakbah	Yang di-Pertua Negeri of Penang; 1975–1981	Succeeded by Awang Hassan
