= Kota Star Utara =

Kedah constituency

Defunct federal constituency
- Legislature: Dewan Rakyat
- Constituency created: 1958
- Constituency abolished: 1974
- First contested: 1959
- Last contested: 1969

Kota Star Utara was a federal constituency in Kedah, Malaysia, that was represented in the Dewan Rakyat from 1959 to 1974.

The federal constituency was created in the 1974 redistribution and was mandated to return a single member to the Dewan Rakyat under the first past the post voting system.

== History ==
It was abolished in 1974 when it was redistributed.

=== Representation history ===
Members of Parliament for Kota Star Utara
Parliament	No	Years	Member	Party	Vote Share
Constituency created from Kota Star
Parliament of the Federation of Malaya
1st	P006	1959–1963	Abdul Khalid Awang Osman (عبدالخالد اوڠ عثمان)	Alliance (UMNO)	8,942; 58.75%
Parliament of Malaysia
1st	P006	1963–1964	Abdul Khalid Awang Osman (عبدالخالد اوڠ عثمان)	Alliance (UMNO)	8,942; 58.75%
2nd	P006	1964–1969	Abdul Khalid Awang Osman (عبدالخالد اوڠ عثمان)	Alliance (UMNO)	11,847; 63.12%
		1969–1971	Parliament was suspended		
3rd	P006	1971–1973	Mawardi Lebai Teh (ماورد ليباي تيه)	PMIP	12,176; 53.73%
3rd	P006	1973–1974	Mawardi Lebai Teh (ماورد ليباي تيه)	BN (PMIP)	12,176; 53.73%
Constituency abolished, split into Kota Setar and Padang Terap

=== State constituency ===
Parliamentary constituency	State constituency						
Parliamentary constituency	1955–1959*	1959–1974	1974–1986	1986–1995	1995–2004	2004–2018	2018–present
Kota Star Utara		Langgar-Limbong					
Kota Star Utara		Pokok Sena					

=== Historical boundaries ===
State Constituency	Area
State Constituency	1959
Langgar-Limbong	Bukit Pinang; Langgar; Limbong; Penyarom; Tajar
Pokok Sena	Bukit Payung; Jabi; Kubur Panjang; Pokok Sena; Senara

== Election results ==
Malaysian general election, 1969: Kota Star Utara
Party	Candidate	Votes	%	∆%
PMIP	Mawardi Lebai Teh	12,176	53.73	▼16.85
Alliance	Mohamed Zahir Ismail	10,487	46.27	▲16.85
Total valid votes		22,663	100.00	
Total rejected ballots		805		
Unreturned ballots		0		
Turnout		23,468	79.16	▼2.58
Registered electors		29,646		
Majority		1,689	7.46	▼18.78
PMIP gain from Alliance		Swing		?

Malaysian general election, 1964: Kota Star Utara
Party	Candidate	Votes	%	∆%
Alliance	Abdul Khalid Awang Osman	11,847	63.12	▲4.37
PMIP	Abu Bakar Umar	6,922	36.88	▼4.37
Total valid votes		18,769	100.00	
Total rejected ballots		835		
Unreturned ballots		0		
Turnout		19,604	81.74	▲4.88
Registered electors		23,982		
Majority		4,925	26.24	▲8.74
Alliance hold		Swing		

Malayan general election, 1959: Kota Star Utara
Party	Candidate	Votes	%
Alliance	Abdul Khalid Awang Osman	8,942	58.75
PMIP	Abu Bakar Umar	6,279	41.25
Total valid votes		15,221	100.00
Total rejected ballots		191	
Unreturned ballots		0	
Turnout		15,412	76.86
Registered electors		20,053	
Majority		2,663	17.50
This was a new constituency created.
