= Tan Siew Sin =

Malaysian politician, Former Minister of Finance and Commerce and Industry

Yang Amat Berbahagia Tun Tan Siew Sin SSM SPMS JP
- 陳修信

3rd President of the Malaysian Chinese Association
- In office November 1961 – 8 April 1974
- Preceded by: Cheah Toon Lok (Acting); Lim Chong Eu
- Succeeded by: Lee San Choon

Minister of Finance
- In office 22 August 1959 – 8 April 1974
- Prime Minister: Tunku Abdul Rahman; Abdul Razak
- Preceded by: H.S. Lee
- Succeeded by: Hussein Onn

Personal details
- Born: 21 May 1916 Malacca, Straits Settlements
- Died: 17 March 1988 (aged 71) Kuala Lumpur, Malaysia
- Party: Malayan Chinese Association (MCA)
- Spouse: Toh Puan Datin Seri Catherine Lim Cheng Neo (林清娘)
- Children: 3
- Parent: Tun Sir Tan Cheng Lock (father)
- Occupation: Politician

Tan Siew Sin (simplified Chinese: 陈修信; traditional Chinese: 陳修信; Pe̍h-ōe-jī: Tân Siu-sìn; pinyin: Chén Xīuxìn; 21 May 1916 – 17 March 1988) was a Malaysian politician who served as the Minister of Commerce and Industry, Minister of Finance, and 3rd President of the Malaysian Chinese Association (MCA, formerly Malayan Chinese Association) – a major component party of Alliance and later Barisan Nasional (BN) coalitions. In his term as the Minister of Finance, a new Malaysian currency, the Malaysian Ringgit, was introduced. He is the longest-serving Minister of Finance, having served in the position for 15 years.

== Early life ==
Tan was born in Malacca on 21 May 1916 as the only son of Malaysian statesman and Malayan Chinese Association (MCA) founder Tan Cheng Lock. Of Peranakan heritage, he did not speak Mandarin. He was educated at Malacca High School and later studied at Raffles College in Singapore. Tan was also a cousin of Goh Keng Swee, who would later become a key architect of Singapore's economic development and serve in several important ministerial roles, including Minister for Finance and Minister for Defence. Despite their familial ties, Tan and Goh became political opponents during the period of Singapore's merger with and subsequent separation from Malaysia.

In 1935, he fell ill and was diagnosed as having tuberculosis. He fully recovered after an operation in Switzerland for treatment. Three years later, he moved on to his higher education in the field of law in England. He never completed his legal studies. Fearing an outbreak of war in Europe, in July 1939, his father ordered him and his two sisters to leave London and return to Malacca. On 1 September 1939, Adolf Hitler invaded Poland, an event that marked the start of World War II. For this reason, he studied only one year of law. He returned from London to take over the family's plantation business that year.

== Political career ==
Tan Siew Sin was elected a Member of Parliament for Malacca in 1955. He joined the Malaysian cabinet first as minister of trade and industry, and later became the finance minister in 1959. He then took over as president of the MCA in November 1961, and held on to both positions until 1974. Tan was appointed the Deputy Chairman of the Alliance in 1964. He led his party to victory in the 1964 General Election, winning 27 of the 33 parliamentary seats contested.

Tan however came under criticism for not pushing for the recognition of Mandarin as an official language and the establishment of a Mandarin language university. In March 1968, Tan proposed setting up the Tunku Abdul Rahman College for Chinese youths who would otherwise be denied an opportunity to tertiary education. The college was formally set up on February 24, 1969. Under Tan's stewardship, the MCA also set up Koperasi Serbaguna Malaysia (KSM), an initiative of MCA Youth based on the cooperative principle.

In the 1969 general election, MCA lost more than half its seats to the new, mainly Chinese Malaysian, opposition parties Democratic Action Party (DAP) and Parti Gerakan Rakyat Malaysia (Gerakan). Tan considered taking the party out of the Alliance but decided against it. In order to regain Chinese support, Tan attempted to broaden the appeal of the party previously seen as a party of the taukeh (tou jia, rich men), and invited professionals to join the party. Other initiatives included the Chinese Unity Movement and the Perak Task Force to help built support in New Villages in Perak. In 1973, Tan Siew Sin requested a position as Deputy Prime Minister in the cabinet reshuffle following the death of Tun Dr. Ismail, but this was refused by Tun Abdul Razak, which angered Tan. Tan retired from politics on 8 April 1974 after undergoing lung surgery. After his resignation he became a financial advisor to the government on economic issues.

== Business career ==
After his retirement from politics, Tan was nominated chairman of Sime Darby. He was also the chairman of United Malacca Rubber Estates, and sat on the boards of a number of companies, including Unitac, Siemens, Pacific Bank, Highlands & Lowlands, and Guardian Royal Exchange Assurance. Tan was also president of the National Shooting Association of Malaysia.

== Death ==
Tan Siew Sin died on 17 March 1988 in Kuala Lumpur, and was buried in the family burial ground in Malacca.

His widow, Catherine Lim Cheng Neo, whom he married on 8 February 1947 was an active campaigner for family planning. They had three daughters.

In Kuala Lumpur, there is a street, Jalan Tun Tan Siew Sin (formerly Jalan Silang) which was renamed after him in 2003. At Tunku Abdul Rahman University College 's Main Campus in Kuala Lumpur there is a new building named after him, known as "Bangunan Tun Tan Siew Sin".

== Election results ==
Federal Legislative Council
Year	Constituency	Candidate	Votes	Pct	Opponent(s)	Votes	Pct	Ballots cast	Majority	Turnout
1955	Malacca Central	Tan Siew Sin (MCA)	17,104	84.26%	Karim Bakar (IND)	3,194	15.74%	20,298	13,910	82.09%

Parliament of the Federation of Malaya
Year	Constituency	Candidate	Votes	Pct	Opponent(s)	Votes	Pct	Ballots cast	Majority	Turnout
1959	P085 Malacca Tengah	Tan Siew Sin (MCA)	13,635	74.55%	Abdul Majid Hussin (PMIP)	4,655	25.45%	18,477	8,980	78.64%

Parliament of Malaysia
Year	Constituency	Candidate	Votes	Pct	Opponent(s)	Votes	Pct	Ballots cast	Majority	Turnout
1964	P085 Malacca Tengah	Tan Siew Sin (MCA)	18,568	74.14%	Hasnul Abdul Hadi (PRM)	5,241	20.93%	25,766	13,327	84.29%
1964	P085 Malacca Tengah	Tan Siew Sin (MCA)	18,568	74.14%	Mohamed Kamal Sudin (PMIP)	1,236	4.94%	25,766	13,327	84.29%
1969	P085 Malacca Tengah	Tan Siew Sin (MCA)	13,790	52.15%	Kampo Radjo (PRM)	6,490	24.55%	28,061	7,300	78.79%
1969	P085 Malacca Tengah	Tan Siew Sin (MCA)	13,790	52.15%	Mohamed Kamal Sudin (PMIP)	6,161	23.30%	28,061	7,300	78.79%

== Honours ==
=== Honours of Malaysia ===
- Malaysia
  - Recipient of the Malaysian Commemorative Medal (Gold) (PPM) (1965)
  - Grand Commander of the Order of Loyalty to the Crown of Malaysia (SSM) – Tun (1967)
- Selangor
  - Knight Grand Commander of the Order of the Crown of Selangor (SPMS) – Dato' Seri (1985)

=== Foreign Honours ===
- Belgium
  - Grand Cross of the Order of Leopold II (1967)
- Indonesia
  - Star of Mahaputera 2nd Class
- Philippine
  - Grand Cross of the Order of Sikatuna, Rank of Datu (GCrS)

=== Other ===
On June 28, 2003, Prime Minister Mahathir Mohamad posthumously awarded Tan the National Integrity Award and paid tribute to his contributions to the nation.

Political offices
Preceded by Cheah Toon Lok (Acting); Lim Chong Eu	Malaysian Chinese Association (MCA) President; November, 1961 – April 8, 1974	Succeeded by Lee San Choon
