= February 1952 Kuala Lumpur Municipal Council election =

February 1952 Kuala Lumpur Municipal Council Election
- February 16, 1952

12 (of 18) seats on Kuala Lumpur Municipal Council 10 seats needed for a majority
- Registered: 11,675
- Turnout: 7,690 (68%)
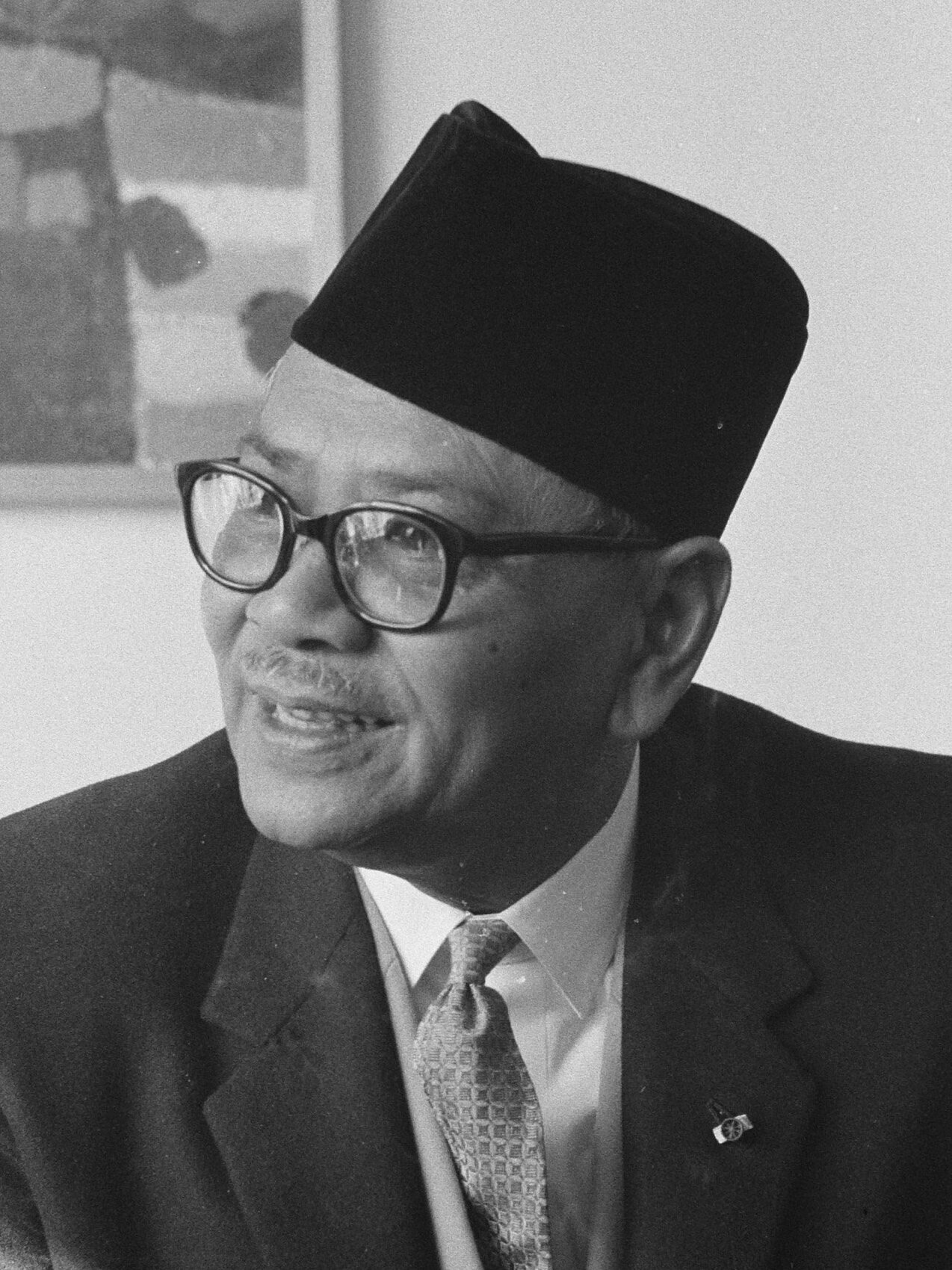

	Majority party	Minority party
Leader	Tunku Abdul Rahman	Onn Jaafar
Party	UMNO	Independence of Malaya Party
Alliance	UMNO-MCA
Seats before	Did not exist	Did not exist
Seats after	9	2
Seat change	▲9	▲2

The February 1952 Kuala Lumpur Municipal Council election took place on 16 February 1952 to elect 12 councillors to the Kuala Lumpur Municipal Council.

This was the first election held for the local government in Kuala Lumpur, and only the third local election to be held in Malaya after George Town, Penang and Malacca in the year before.

There were 12 out of 18 seats on the municipal council up for election, the remaining six seats were filled by appointed councillors. The newly formed UMNO-MCA electoral alliance contested an election for the first time, as was the Independence of Malaya Party (IMP) under the leadership of its founder and president Onn Jaafar, who left UMNO in the previous year. The Selangor Labour Party also contested the election, alongside the Rentpayers' Association and several other independents. Both the UMNO-MCA alliance and IMP fielded their candidate in all 12 contested seats.

The UMNO-MCA alliance won in a landslide, taking 9 out of 12 contested seats. The IMP secured 2 seats, while an independent took the remaining seat. The Selangor Labour Party failed to win any seat.

Councillors with the lowest winning votes from each ward had to retire in December that year to make way for the first regular annual election of the municipality.

Annual elections continued to take place except for 1959-60 when they were suspended by the federal government, resuming in 1961 before they were suspended again in 1965 by the Malaysian government citing Konfrontasi, and they were officially abolished under the Local Government Act 1976.

== Background ==
In the aftermath of World War II, the British colonial administration introduced local elections in the Federation of Malaya beginning in 1951 to familiarise Malayans with democratic and election processes. It was done to prepare the Federation for self governance and eventual independence.

The introduction of elections based on adult suffrage was made carefully to begin with local government, with the aim to gradually expand towards state and federal levels.

Preparations for municipal elections in Kuala Lumpur began in 1951, with the machinery being set up after the municipal elections bill was passed in May that year.

The municipality's constitution was also promulgated in the same year, which stipulated 12 of the 18 councillors were to be elected, and the remaining six were to be appointed. The council will also have a president and deputy president, roles exclusive of the councillors.

== Electoral system ==
12 of 18 councillors on the municipal council were to be elected in this election.

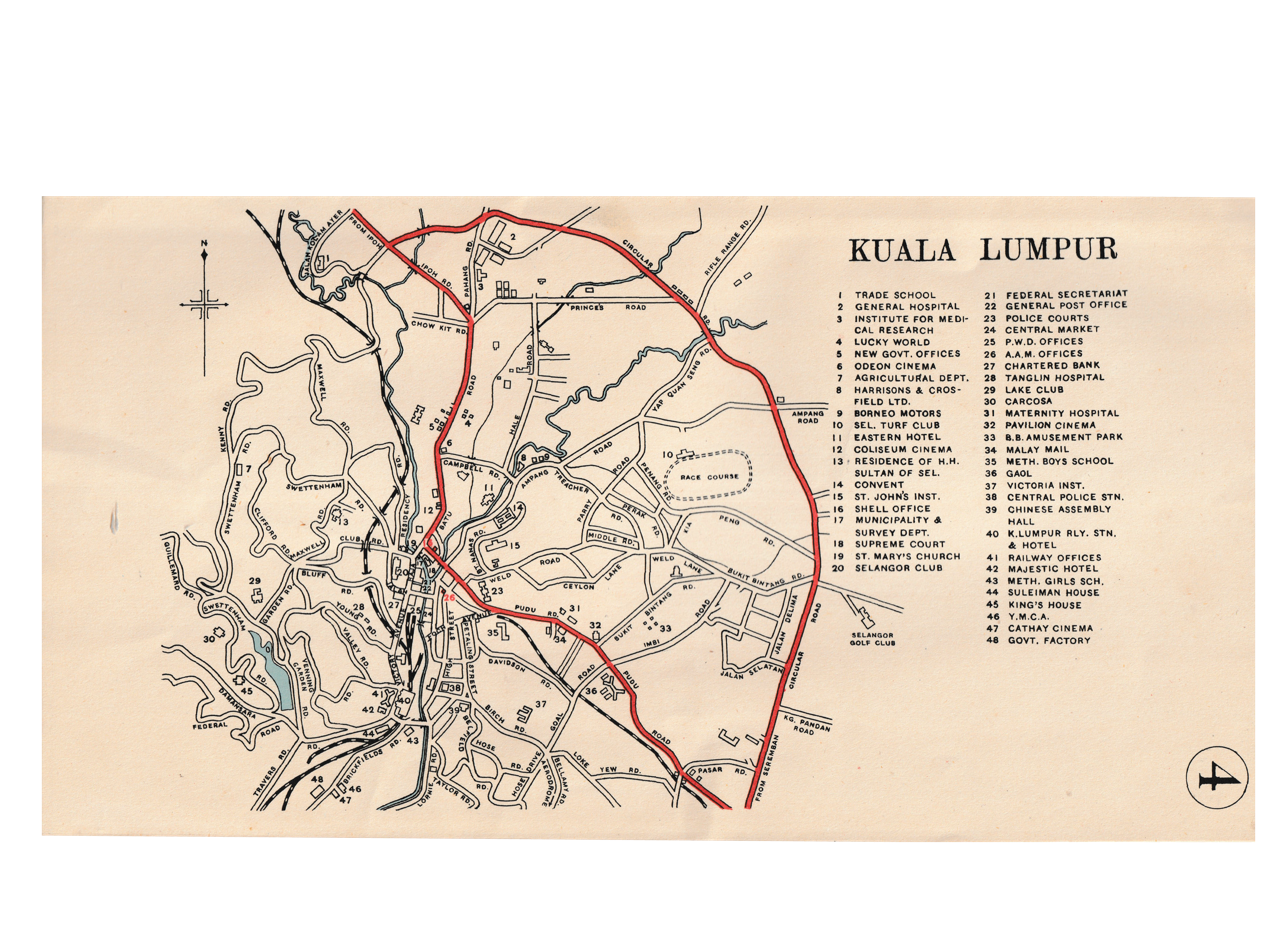
A map of Kuala Lumpur in 1951. The municipality was divided into four wards in the election: Petaling, Bungsar, Sentul, and Imbi.

The municipal council was divided into 4 wards: Bungsar, Imbi, Petaling, and Sentul. Each ward would elect 3 councillors, making a total of 12 elected councillors.

Under the municipal constitution, the 12 councillors elected in this election will retire in batches based on the amount of votes they received. The councillors who received the smallest winning votes from each ward would retire at the end of that year for the first regular annual election to take place. Councillors who received the second smallest winning votes will retire in second annual election, and councillors who received the largest votes will retire in the third annual election.

Voter registration began on May 1951 and closed in August that year. The total registered electorate stood at 11,657. It was approximately one-fifth of the estimated potential electorate based on the 1949 census.

Candidates were not officially listed with their political party affiliation in the election results gazette; however, their backgrounds were widely reported in the media.

=== Polling districts ===
According to the gazette issued on 18 January 1952, the Kuala Lumpur Municipal Council had 4 electoral wards and a total of 11 polling districts.

Electoral Ward	Polling Districts	Code	Location
Petaling	Tengah	PT	Chinese Assembly Hall
Petaling	Salak South	PSS	Railway Station, Pudu
Bungsar	Brickfields	BB	Y.M.C.A., Brickfields Road
Bungsar	Kolam Ayer	BKA	Information Centre, Batu Road
Sentul	Kampong Baharu "A"	SKB (A)	Malay School, Kampong Baharu
Sentul	Kampong Baharu "B"	SKB (B)	Malay Girls' School, Kampong Baharu
Sentul	Setapak	SS	Malay Girls' School, Setapak
Sentul	Workshops	SW	Railway Institute, Sentul
Imbi	Ampang	IA	Convent School, Peel Road
Imbi	Bukit Bintang	IBB	Pasar Road Malay School
Imbi	Bukit Nanas	IBN	St. John's Institution

== Campaign ==
Nomination of candidates for the inaugural election took place on 10 January, while polling date was set to be on 9 February, before it was postponed by a week to 16 February to accommodate for Thaipusam, which would affect polling especially among the Indian community. A total of 32 candidates contested the election.

The election saw the participation of newly formed political parties, as well as the forming of alliances in order to consolidate different voter bases, avoid vote splitting, and form an effective majority in the council. This is most notably done by UMNO and MCA, as this was the first time they cooperated with each other in an election. Their cooperation was the precursor to the future Alliance Party, and subsequently Barisan Nasional, which dominated Malayan and Malaysian politics for over 60 years.

=== UMNO-MCA alliance ===
The Kuala Lumpur division of UMNO and the Selangor branch of MCA, made a joint declaration on 8 January that stated they would contest the municipal election as an alliance. The move was seen as unexpected and took place just two days before nomination deadline for candidates. The parties said in a statement that the two organisations believed that inter-racial harmony was a pre-requisite to any successful administration.

The alliance contested all 12 elected seats, of which six candidates were from MCA, one was an associate member of MCA, and the remaining five were from UMNO.

The two parties released their manifestos separately. MCA released its 12-points manifesto on 3 January, saying it would put up both Chinese and non-Chinese candidates in the election, and called for a ban on politics in the municipal council, arguing local affairs should "neither be influenced by politics nor communal basis". It also called for better infrastructure, transportation, and sewage system; building more parks and community centres, addressing hawkers grievances, and speeding up approvals for housing plans, among others.

UMNO released its 18-points manifesto on 8 January, which among others, called for the formation of ward councils in each ward to learn the needs of the constituents. It called for improvement in health and sanitation in the municipality, including developing a sewage disposal system, cheap and adequate water supplies, extension of pre and post-natal services, and systemic clearance of slum areas. The party also focused on advancing Islamic welfare, including call for regulation of meat sales in markets to protect Islamic beliefs.

During the campaign, the forming of the alliance by the two parties was attacked by its opponents. Future prime minister of Malaysia Hussein Onn, who was a member of rivalling IMP at the time, claimed UMNO and MCA could never work together due to their policies being far apart, characterising the alliance as "an unequal marriage" and saying "the MCA is the man and UMNO the woman." The Rentpayers' Association, another opponent, also attacked the alliance, expressing surprise at the cooperation, and cast doubts that the merger received unanimous support from its members.

=== IMP ===
The Independence of Malaya Party (IMP), which was formed by Onn Jaafar after his exit from UMNO in the previous year, contested all 12 elected seats in the election. The party released a 10-point manifesto, calling for wider franchise, fully-elected council, better housing and municipal services, providing free and compulsory education within the city, and better medical facilities, among others.

The IMP said it will oppose any tax increase while fulfilling its pledges, and claimed that projects would be "financed out of savings."

=== Selangor Labour Party ===
The Selangor Labour Party was formed only in late December 1951, just a little more than a month and a half before the election took place. The party put forward five candidates to contest the election.

The party said it is the answer to monopolistic capitalism, and advocated, among other things, the abolition of nominated councilors. It argued that funding to carry out the party's agenda for the city's improvement would come from the government handing over entertainment and licensing duties, taxes from petrol, road vehicles, and other sources collected in Kuala Lumpur, to the municipality.

=== Rentpayers' Association ===
The Rentpayers' Association advocated for residential welfare in the city, and nominated one candidate, M Pawanchik, a clerk, to contest the Sentul ward. Another association member, T.R.P. Dawson, withdrew his candidacy on the last minute, citing his staunch support for the IMP.

The association released an 11-point manifesto which called for changing the status of unauthorised houses in the city to become permanent and supplying them with basic utilities, regulating vacant houses and cubicles, providing schooling for unschooled children, building community centers with reading rooms and libraries, and municipal takeover of bus services, among other pledges.

=== Women candidates in the election ===
This election also saw four women candidates contesting. Three were from IMP: E. Ramachandram (Imbi ward), Loke Soh Lip (Petaling ward), and Devaki Krishnan (Bungsar), who later won her seat. One woman candidate was from the UMNO-MCA alliance: Elsie Somasundram (Bungsar), who contested as an associate member of MCA under the UMNO-MCA alliance.

== Results ==
Results were announced on the same night as polling at the Kuala Lumpur town hall, with Commissioner-General Malcolm MacDonald, Selangor Mentri Besar Raja Uda Raja Muhammad among other prominent officials present.

The UMNO-MCA alliance won in a landslide, winning 9 out of 12 available seats, one short to form a majority on the council. The alliance swept all the seats in three wards: Imbi, Petaling, and Sentul, while failing to win any seat in the Bungsar ward. Among the seats the alliance won, six were from MCA, and three from UMNO.

The IMP won just two seats, both in the Bungsar ward. Independent candidate S.C.E. Singam obtained the highest vote in the Bungsar ward, earning him a seat on the municipal council. Selangor Labour Party and the Rentpayers' Association failed to win any seat.

Party	Votes	%	Seats	+/–
UMNO-MCA	10,338	50.71	9	New
Independence of Malaya Party	6,631	32.53	2	New
Independents	1,393	6.83	1	New
Selangor Labour Party	1,603	7.86	0	New
Rentpayers' Association	420	2.06	0	New
Appointed Councillors			6	New
Total	20,385	100.00	18	0
Valid votes	7,690	96.19		
Invalid/blank votes	305	3.81		
Total votes	7,995	100.00		
Registered voters/turnout	11,675	68.48		
Source: Federation of Malaya Government Gazette - Government of Selangor 1952; Tindak Malaysia

*As voters can cast vote for three candidates, the number of total votes do not tally with the number of valid votes. Information is presented as per government gazette records.

== Results by ward ==
=== Bungsar ===
Kuala Lumpur Municipal Council Election (February 1952): Bungsar (3 seats)
Party	Candidate	Votes	%	±%
Independent	S. C. E. Singam	718	-	-
IMP	K. L. Devaser	577	-	-
IMP	Devaki Krishnan	570	-	-
UMNO-MCA	Ahmad Mahmood	517	-	−
UMNO-MCA	Raja Mohamed Raja Alang	508	-	−
Labour	S. Karalasingam	466	-	−
IMP	T. Rajendra	422	-	−
UMNO-MCA	Elsie Somasundram	232	-	−
Total valid votes		1672	-	-
Rejected ballots		59	-	-
Turnout		1731	78.57	−
Registered electors		2,203	100	−
Source: Federation of Malaya Government Gazette - Selangor Government 1952 Vol 5 TindakMalaysia

=== Imbi ===
Kuala Lumpur Municipal Council Election (February 1952): Imbi (3 seats)
Party	Candidate	Votes	%	±%
UMNO-MCA	Chan Chee Hong	840	-	-
UMNO-MCA	Cheah Ewe Keat	833	-	-
UMNO-MCA	Douglas K. K. Lee	778	-	-
Labour	K. C. Chia	645	-	−
IMP	T. R. Marks	530	-	−
IMP	Chua Boon Guan	452	-	−
IMP	E. Ramachandram	419	-	−
Labour	Ho Tee Chim	-	-	−
Total valid votes		1785	100	-
Rejected ballots		41	-	-
Turnout		1,826	71.24	−
Registered electors		2,563	100	−
Source: Federation of Malaya Government Gazette - Selangor Government 1952 Vol 5 TindakMalaysia

=== Petaling ===
Kuala Lumpur Municipal Council Election (February 1952): Petaling (3 seats)
Party	Candidate	Votes	%	±%
UMNO-MCA	Chan Kwong Hon	871	-	-
UMNO-MCA	Ong Yoke Lin	856	-	-
UMNO-MCA	Lee Yoon Thim	750	-	-
IMP	Ng Kok Thoy	323	-	−
IMP	Leong Hoe Yeng	320	-	−
IMP	Loke Soh Lip	299	-	−
Independent	A. Tharmalingam	299	-	−
Independent	V. G. T. Singam	251	-	−
Labour	Yap Chong Kuen	115	-	−
Total valid votes		1531	100	-
Rejected ballots		56	-	-
Turnout		1,587	61.04	−
Registered electors		2,600	100	−
Source: Federation of Malaya Government Gazette - Selangor Government 1952 Vol 5 TindakMalaysia

=== Sentul ===
Kuala Lumpur Municipal Council Election (February 1952): Sentul
Party	Candidate	Votes	%	±%
UMNO-MCA	Abdullah Yassin	1616	59.80	-
UMNO-MCA	Yahaya Sheikh Ahmad	1296	47.96	-
UMNO-MCA	Mohamed Salleh Hakim	1243	46.00	-
IMP	Abdul Aziz Ishak	1151	42.59	−
IMP	Mohamed Tahir Kuteh	834	30.87	−
IMP	K. V. Thaver	744	27.54	−
Rentpayers' Association	Pawanchick Mohamed	420	15.54	−
Total valid votes		2702	100	-
Rejected ballots		149	5.23	-
Turnout		2,851	67.5	−
Registered electors		4,226	100	−
Source: Federation of Malaya Government Gazette - Selangor Government 1952 Vol 5 TindakMalaysia

== Reactions ==
The results showed a strong communal tendency among voters, as the UMNO-MCA alliance swept all but one ward in the election.

The president of UMNO, Tunku Abdul Rahman, telegraphed his congratulations to Selangor UMNO chairman Dato Yahaya Abdul Razak. Dato Yahaya said the results "vindicated our attitude", adding they had fought cleanly and without malice towards anyone.

H.S. Lee, who was the MCA head in Selangor, and whose son Douglas Lee won a seat in Imbi, said voters had shown active support of the UMNO-MCA alliance, and will now "extend their close co-operation to other states and settlements, in order to form a strong foundation for a united Malaya."

The IMP suffered its biggest setback since its formation in the previous year. Dato Onn Ja'afar, the founder of the party, congratulated the UMNO-MCA alliance, and said he hopes the alliance will implement what had been promised.

The Selangor Labour Party failed to win any seat. It's president, K.C. Chia, who lost the contest in the Imbi ward, said the party is undeterred by its failure to secure any seats. The party then planned to expand and develop itself further by recruiting more members.

== Aftermath ==
Councilors were sworn in and held its first meeting on 19 February, where the UMNO-MCA alliance holds key municipal council committees.

UMNO and MCA continued to expand their alliance beyond this municipal election, with more electoral pacts agreed in other states. This began with the discussions at the settlement and state level, such as in Penang and Kedah, before progressing to colony-wide alliance discussion between the two parties, with clear support from UMNO president and future prime minister of Malaya Tunku Abdul Rahman. Alliance cooperation between UMNO and MCA was also mooted in the Colony of Singapore, with Tunku urging the Singapore UMNO to support MCA if the latter contested there, while pledging in the same interview to dissolve UMNO as soon as Malaya achieved Independence.

== Legacy ==
This election held significance in Malaysian history, as it was only the third election that took place in Malaya, and the first in Kuala Lumpur, the capital of the federation at the time.

More local elections were soon held across Malaya, Singapore, Sarawak, and North Borneo (Sabah) in subsequent years, and elections were expanded to state level in 1952, and to the federal level, for Malaya in 1955, and Malaysia in 1964.

Local elections were suspended in 1959-1960 for the reorganisation of local governments to take place under the Local Government Elections Act 1960, and resumed in 1961. It was then suspended again in 1965 by the Malaysian federal government citing security concerns amid Indonesia's Konfrontasi campaign. The system of local government elections was abolished under the Local Government Act 1976, councillors were no longer elected but instead appointed directly by each state government.

This election is widely mentioned in academic and political discourse, especially when it comes to discussions and debates surrounding the revival of local elections in Malaysia.

== See also ==
- Local Governments in Malaysia
- 1952 Malayan Local Elections
