= H. S. Lee =

Malaysian politician and businessman

Yang Amat Berbahagia Colonel Tun Sir Henry Lee Hau Shik SMN KBE JP
- 李孝式
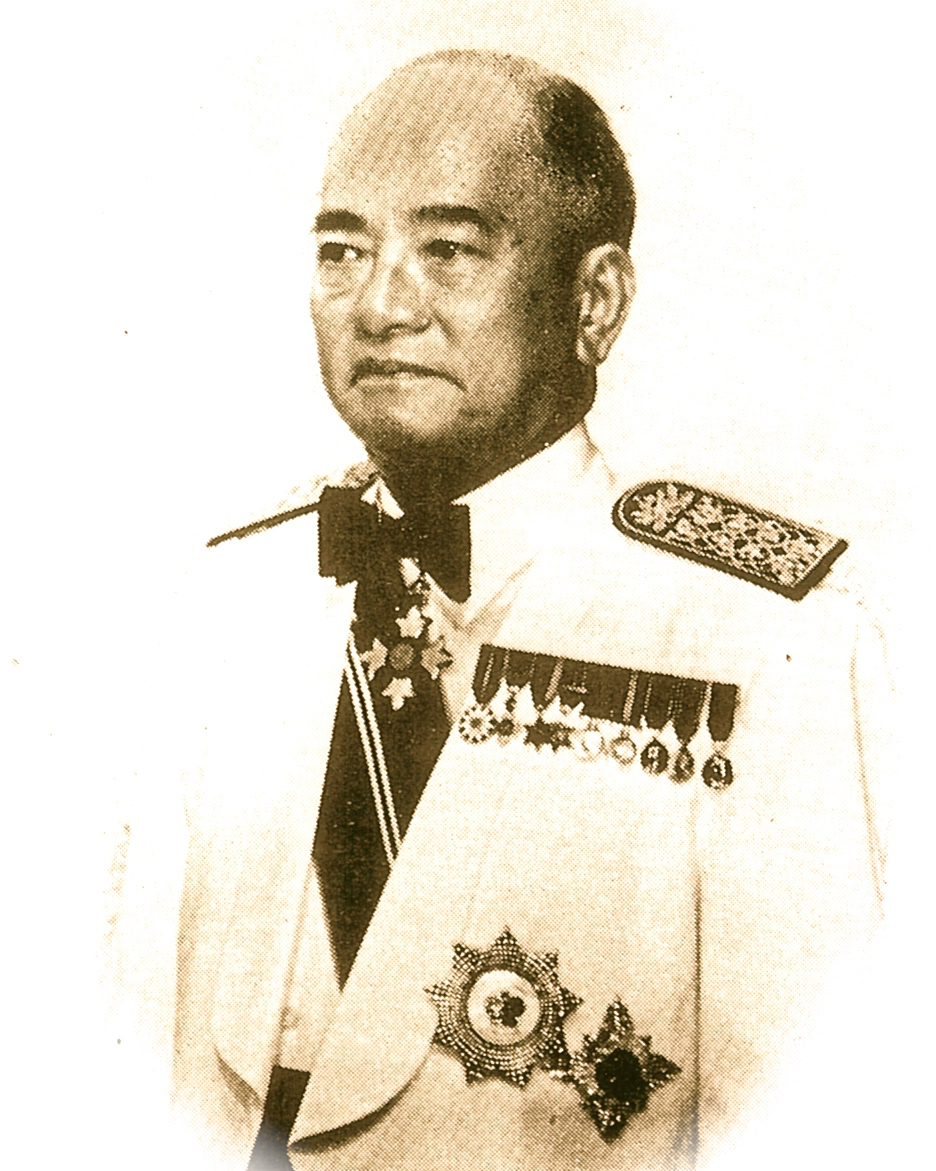
- Lee in 1957

Minister of Finance
- In office 31 August 1957 – 22 August 1959
- Monarch: Abdul Rahman
- Prime Minister: Tunku Abdul Rahman
- Preceded by: Position established
- Succeeded by: Tan Siew Sin

Minister of Transport
- In office 1 August 1955 – 31 August 1957
- Monarch: Elizabeth II
- Chief minister: Tunku Abdul Rahman
- Preceded by: Position established
- Succeeded by: Tan Siew Sin

Personal details
- Born: 19 November 1900 British Hong Kong
- Died: 22 June 1988 (aged 87) Kuala Lumpur, Malaysia
- Party: Kuomintang (KMT); Malaysian Chinese Association (MCA); Independence of Malaya Party (IMP)
- Spouse(s): Dawn Kathleen Glen; Kwan Choi Lin
- Education: St John's College, Cambridge; University of London
- Occupation: Politician, businessman, banker, lawyer

Military service
- Allegiance: Republic of China; United Kingdom; Malaysia
- Branch/service: National Revolutionary Army; British Indian Army
- Rank: Colonel
- Battles/wars: World War II

Sir Henry Lee Hau Shik (Yue Chinese: 李孝式; 19 November 1900 – 22 June 1988), also known as H. S. Lee, was a Malaysian politician and businessman who served as the Minister of Finance and Minister of Transport under former Chief Minister and former Prime Minister Tunku Abdul Rahman from August 1955 to August 1959 during which time Federation of Malaya gained independence from Britain in August 1957. He co-founded the Malaysian Chinese Association (MCA) and Alliance Party (Alliance), the predecessor of the Barisan Nasional (BN). He was also a member of the Merdeka mission to London and the only Chinese signatory to the Malayan independence agreement with Britain. He was the only major leader of the independence movement not born in Malaya, instead, he was born in British Hong Kong.

== Early life and education ==
Henry Lee Hau Shik was born on 19 November 1900 in Hong Kong, the eldest son of prominent and wealthy businessman Lee Kwai-Lim and Kam Kwok-Chun. His family ran a silk-trading firm, Kam Lun Tai, which later branched into remittance and mining, with offices in Hong Kong and Singapore. He had two brothers and two sisters.

Lee's great-grandfather had been a senior official during the reign of Emperor Tongzhi of the Qing dynasty while his grandfather was a famous scholar and philanthropist in his hometown of Zhenlong, Xinyi in Guangdong.

Lee received his secondary education in Guangzhou in 1914, before attending Queen's College in Hong Kong. He completed degrees in Economics and Law at the University of London and St John's College, Cambridge, where he came to know the future King George VI.

Lee's first job was as a government servant in Hainan, which he quit after three days as his boss would only play mahjong all day. He then worked at P&O Bank in Hong Kong.

=== Life in Malaya ===
Lee came to Malaya on holiday in 1924 and stayed on after acquiring a tin mine in Kepong, subsequently establishing himself as a major tin mine owner in Selangor and Perak.

In Malaya, Lee was deeply involved in Chinese guild and clan associations and became a recognised leader of the Guangdong and Gaozhou communities. He helped form the Kwantung Association, Chinese Mining Association and Chinese Chamber of Commerce. He was also president of the Miners' Association of Negeri Sembilan, Selangor and Pahang from 1938 to 1955 and president of the Pan-Malayan Association of Tin Miners between 1946 and 1955.

At various times, he was president of the Selangor Kwang Tung Association, National Kwang Tung Association, Pan-Malayan Kochow Association, United Lees' Association, Federation of Malaya Red Cross Association and Kuen Cheng Girls School.

When Japan invaded China in 1937, Lee, who was known for his association with China's Kuomintang Party, headed the Selangor China Relief Fund in support of China. On 26 October in the following year, Selangor Chinese originating from Guangdong Province organized the Kwang Tung Chinese Home-Relief Association (KTCHRA). At its inaugural congress, Lee, one of the sponsors of the movement, gave a speech in which he explained why the association was to be formed. A prominent leader of the Chinese community in general and the anti-Japanese movement in particular at that time, Cheong Yoke Choy, was appointed as its president, while Lee and Chong Khoon Lin were appointed as vice-presidents. He was later made Chief of the Passive Defence Forces of Kuala Lumpur in 1941. Due to his anti-Japanese war efforts, Lee was forced to flee with his family to Mumbai via Chongqing when the war reached Malaya that same year and the Japanese put out a bounty on him.

Lee was made a colonel in the Kuomintang army, then based in Burma, after meeting Chiang Kai-shek in Chongqing. Later, Lee was also made a colonel of the British Army in India and liaised between the two Allied armies along the China-Burma border for the remainder of the war.

== Political career ==
After World War II, Lee was appointed to committees tasked with rebuilding the Malayan economy, which had suffered during the Japanese occupation. When emergency rule was imposed by the British in 1948 in response to the communist insurgency, he was appointed to the Malayan Union Advisory Council, Federal Legislative Council and Federal Executive Council.

Lee was also advisor to the Director of Operations representing the mining and farming communities, and managed to persuade British High Commissioner to Malaya Gerald Templer to reorganise the Home Guard in the Kinta Valley so they could defend the tin mines. For his active opposition to the communists, he was branded a "running dog of the British" and a sum of 60,000 Malayan dollars was put on his head.

In time, Lee felt it was necessary for the Malayan Chinese community to distinguish itself from ethnic Chinese communist supporters and formed the Selangor Malayan Chinese Association (MCA), with the support of the Chinese Chamber of Commerce and Chinese guilds in the state. Other states eventually followed his lead and set up their own associations. Lee remained head of Selangor MCA until 1955, when he lost the post to Ong Yoke Lin.

Lee was also involved in founding the central body of the MCA in 1949. He drafted the party's rules and regulations together with Yong Shook Lin and Khoo Teik Ee, and was instrumental in getting Tan Cheng Lock to become chairman of the MCA steering committee and its first president.

=== Alliance Party ===
Lee played a key role in forging an ad hoc arrangement with the United Malays National Organisation (UMNO) to contest in the 1952 local elections that would later evolve into the Alliance Party, the predecessor of the Barisan Nasional coalition that has governed Malaysia since independence.

Lee, in his capacity as Selangor MCA chief, and Kuala Lumpur UMNO chairman Yahya Razak agreed to field a single slate of candidates in Kuala Lumpur to counter the formidable Independence of Malaya Party (IMP). The IMP was led by UMNO's founder Onn Jaafar and enjoyed support from several MCA leaders – including MCA president Tan Cheng Lock – due to the party's non-communal stance.

Lee had attracted Yahya's attention with the election manifesto he penned for Selangor MCA, which declared that "the interests of the members of the other communities should also be represented" despite Kuala Lumpur's large Chinese population. Yahya then contacted former Victoria Institution schoolmate Ong Yoke Lin, another MCA leader, who fixed a meeting of representatives from MCA and UMNO. On 7 January 1952, both sides agreed to contest jointly in elections, fielding 12 candidates – five Malays, six Chinese and one Indian.

The local electoral pact was at first opposed from within both MCA and UMNO. Senior MCA leaders Tan Siew Sin and Khoo Teik Ee declared during the campaign period that the party's central working committee had not approved the alliance and called on voters to support the non-racial IMP. Yahya was accused of selling out the Malays by working with the Chinese and his division head Datin Putih Mariah resigned just days before elections in protest.

In the end, the UMNO-MCA ticket won 9 of the 12 seats contested in Kuala Lumpur, failing only to win any seat in Bangsar. In the weeks after the Kuala Lumpur elections, Lee was in contact with UMNO president Tunku Abdul Rahman, who mooted a nationwide alliance of the two parties. Despite some initial reluctance, Tan Cheng Lock, who had preferred to work with Onn, eventually agreed to meet Tunku together with Lee on 18 March 1952 to discuss the merger. After several more rounds of talks with other MCA leaders, the Alliance Party was institutionalised.

Lee had managed to bring Tan around to his point of view by alerting him to the Select Committee's Report on the Immigration Ordinance of 1950, in which Onn was a signatory to a Majority Report with recommendations that were unfavourable to the Chinese and were opposed by Chinese members of the Legislative Council. This raised doubts in Tan's mind about Onn's commitment to multi-racial fairness.

The Alliance would go on to sweep local elections held elsewhere that year and decisively win the 1955 general election to form the first locally elected government, with Tunku as chief minister. Lee was appointed transport minister, one of three portfolios held by MCA in Tunku's Cabinet.

=== Road to independence ===
In 1956, Lee and Tan Tong Hye were selected to represent MCA as part of an Alliance delegation that went to London to pressure Britain into granting independence to Malaya. Lee was the only Chinese signatory to the independence agreement concluded in London that year. With independence in 1957, Tunku, now prime minister, appointed Lee as Malaya's first finance minister. His primary task included establishing the country's financial policy and the creation of a Central Bank of Malaya. Lee resigned from the post two years later due to ill health.

Upon retiring from politics in 1959, Lee assumed the post of Financial chairman for the Board of Commissioners of Currency, Malaya until 1961. In 1966, he established the Development and Commercial Bank (D&C Bank), which became Malaysia's fifth largest bank. He would head the bank until his death in 1988.

== Other achievements ==
Lee was a keen sportsman and avid golfer. He was appointed president of the Senior Golfers Club as well as the Golf Association of Malaya in 1957. Between 1957 and 1959, he headed the Federation of Malaya Olympics Council. In addition, he practised taijiquan for health reasons.

Lee was the first president of the Oxford and Cambridge Society of Malaysia.

He also founded China Press in 1946 to counter the communist influence of Min Sheng Pao, the only local Chinese newspaper at that time.

== Personal life ==
Lee met his first wife Dawn Kathleen Glen, an Englishwoman, while studying at Cambridge. They had two sons, Douglas and Vivien Leslie, in Hong Kong. Glen returned to Britain for good with Vivien after falling afoul of Lee's mother, who disliked her daughter-in-law's penchant for smoking and sports cars. Lee married his second wife, Kwan Choi Lin, with whom he had seven more children. He named his children after the places where they were born.

Lee had a grandson named Kenneth Lee Fook Mun, alias Omar Iskandar Lee Abdullah, who was involved in a road rage incident in August 2000 in which he fatally shot a female accountant named Linda Lee Good Yew. Kenneth was initially sentenced to 8 years in prison for culpable homicide in July 2003. But subsequently, in March 2005, upon the prosecution's appeal to the higher courts of Malaysia (Court of Appeal of Malaysia), he was found guilty of murder and sentenced to death, which was affirmed by the highest court of Malaysia (Federal Court of Malaysia) a year later. However, in January 2008, while awaiting execution, he was granted clemency by the Yang di-Pertuan Agong, leading to his death sentence being commuted to life imprisonment.

Two of his sons also entered politics. Dato' Douglas Lee Kim Kiu (1924–2022) contested successfully in the 1952 Kuala Lumpur municipal elections whilst Tan Sri Alexander Lee Yu Lung (1938–1999) was briefly in the MCA before joining Gerakan and assumed several deputy minister posts between 1989 and 1995.. His daughter-in-law, Datin Ruby Lee (wife of Douglas) was the longest serving Secretary General for the Malaysian Red Crescent, with a tenure of 32 years and awarded the Henry Dunant Medal.

== Honours ==
Lee was appointed a Commander of the Order of the British Empire (CBE) in 1948 by King George VI, and Knight Commander of the Order of the British Empire (KBE) in 1957 by Queen Elizabeth II in recognition of his services to the British colonial government.

In 1959, Lee was awarded the Seri Maharaja Mangku Negara, which carries with it the title "Tun", for his significant contributions to Malaya's independence struggle and nation-building. He was the 10th recipient of the award.

Jalan Bandar, originally known as High Street, was renamed Jalan Tun H.S. Lee in his honour in November 1988.

=== Honours of Malaya ===
- Malaya
  - Grand Commander of the Order of the Defender of the Realm (SMN) – Tun (1959)

=== Commonwealth honours ===
- United Kingdom
  - Commander of the Order of the British Empire (CBE) (1948)
  - Knight Commander of the Order of the British Empire (KBE) – Sir (1957)
