= History of Kuala Lumpur =

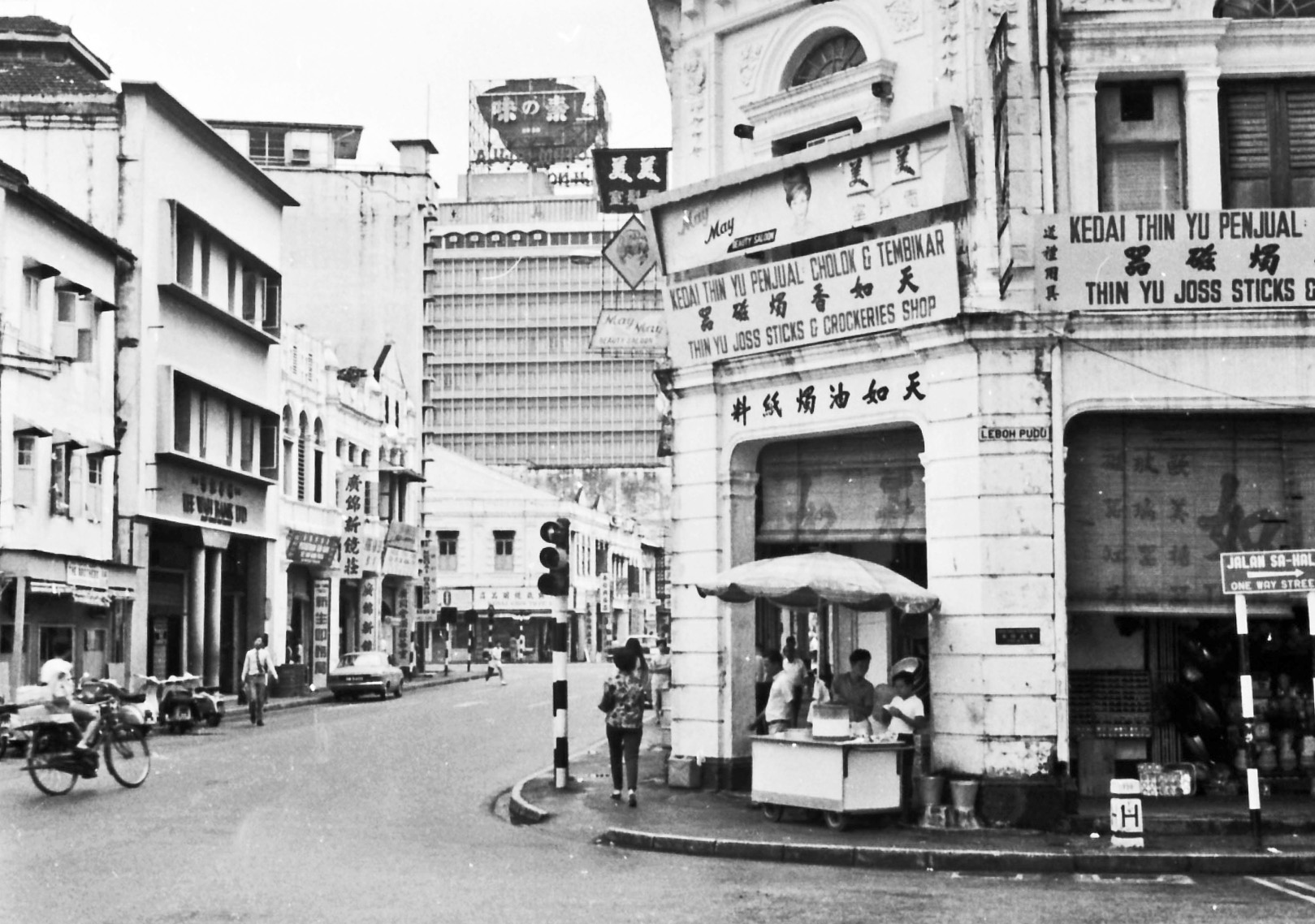
Kuala Lumpur in 1971.

Kuala Lumpur is the largest city in Malaysia; it is also the nation's capital. The history of Kuala Lumpur began in the middle of the 19th century with the rise of the tin mining industry, and boomed in the early 20th century with the development of rubber plantations in Selangor. It became the capital of Selangor, later the Federated Malay States, and then Malayan Union, Malaya and finally Malaysia.

== Pre-independence era (1857–1957) ==
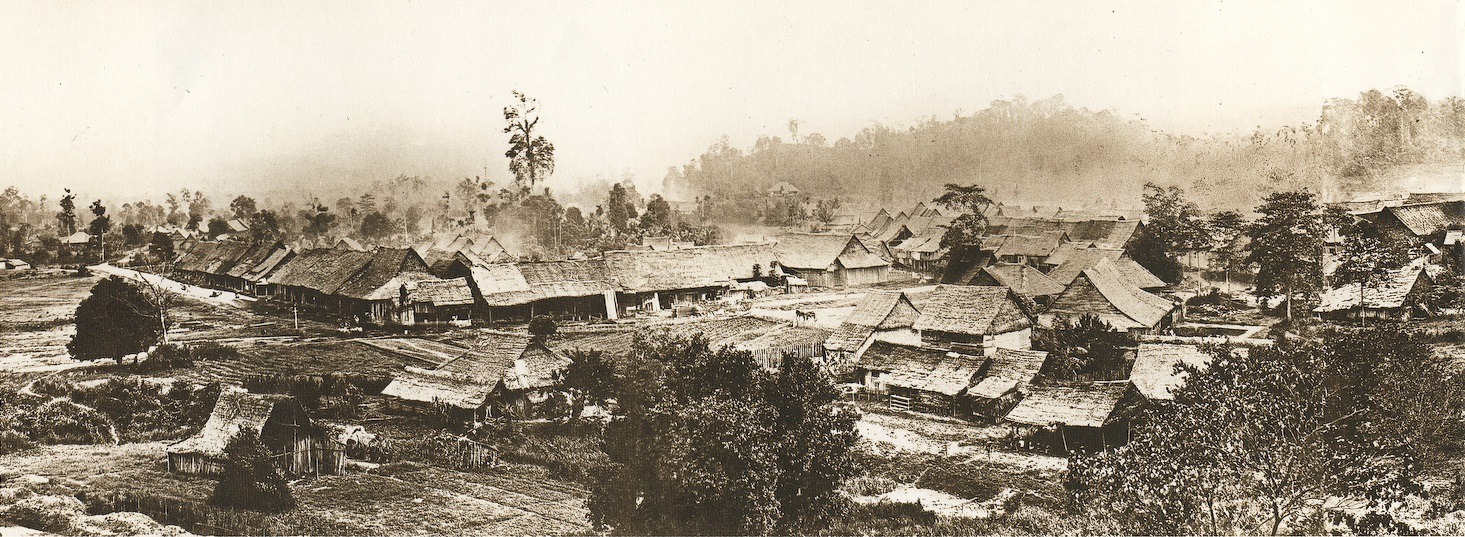
Kuala Lumpur, circa 1884.

Kuala Lumpur was founded ca. 1857 at the confluence of the Gombak and Klang rivers. In Malay, the name Kuala Lumpur literally means "muddy confluence". The venture into the muddy confluence started when a member of the Selangor royal family hired tin prospectors to open tin mines in the Klang Valley. The Journal of the Malayan Branch of the Royal Asiatic Society states that Raja Abdullah (who was involved in the Klang War) founded Kuala Lumpur, aside from also opening up tin-mines up river and had introduced the Chinese into the region. A total of 87 Chinese prospectors went up the river Klang and began prospecting in the Ampang area, which was then jungle. Despite 69 of them dying due to the pestilential conditions, a thriving tin mine was established.

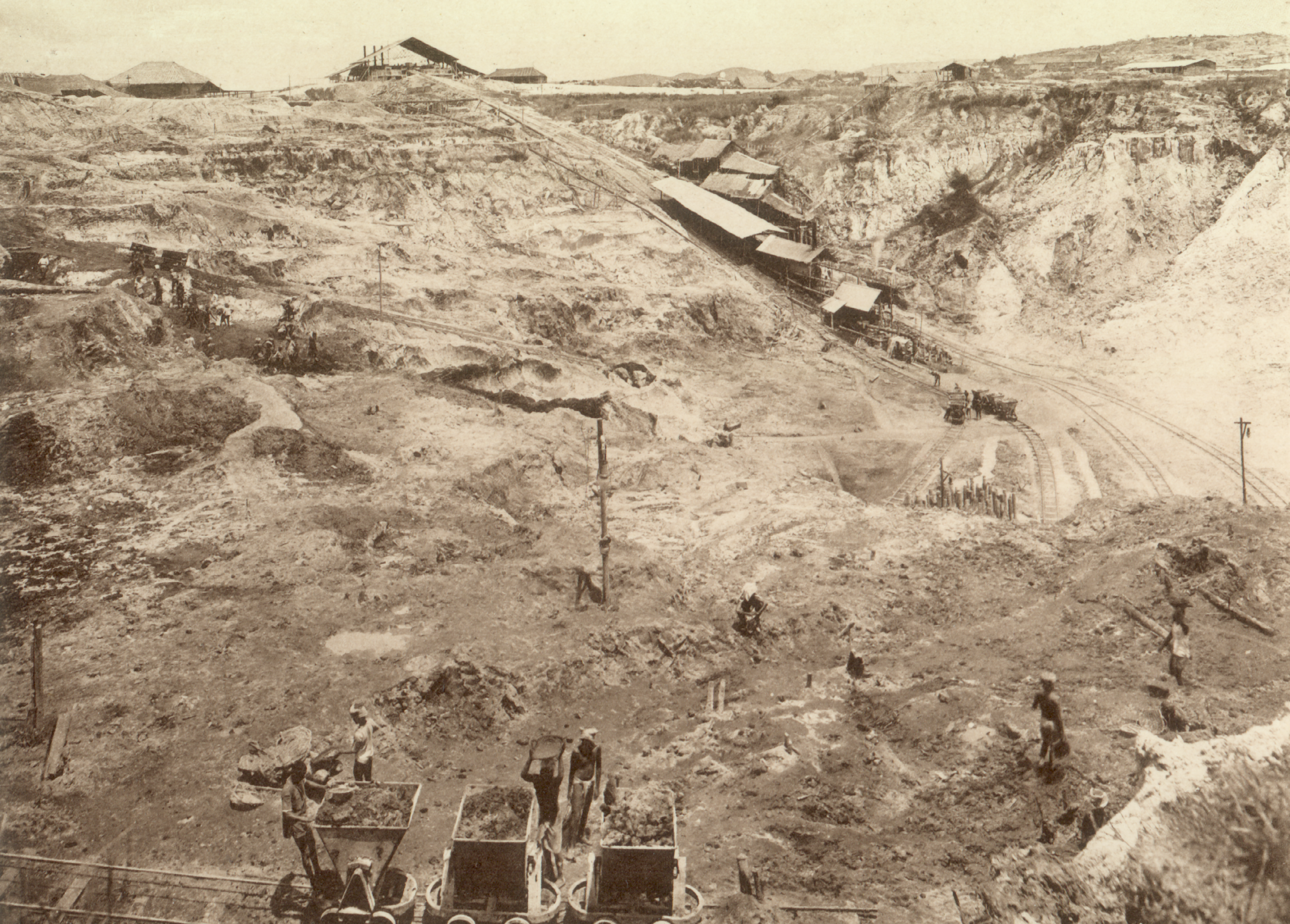
Tin mining in Sungei Besi circa 1910

This naturally attracted merchants who traded basic provisions to the miners in exchange for some of the tin. Sutan Puasa, an early explorer and trade at Ampang Road, invited two traders from Lukut, Hiu Siew and Yap Ah Sze to set up shops to sell provisions to the miners. Kuala Lumpur was the furthest point up the Klang River to which supplies could conveniently be brought by boat; it therefore became a collection and dispersal point serving the tin mines. The town, spurred on by tin-mining, started to develop beside the confluence of the Gombak and Klang rivers with the Old Market Square (Medan Pasar) its commercial centre. The Chinese mainly settled around the Market Square; the Malays, later also Indian Chettiars and Indian Muslims, resided further north in areas such as Kampung Rawa with Java Street (now Jalan Tun Perak) the boundary between the Chinese and Malay areas. Roads radiated out from the early town centre to other significant destinations; these roads connected Kuala Lumpur to Ampang (Ampang Road), then Pudu (Pudu Road) and Batu (Batu Road) where miners also started to settled in, as well as Petaling (Petaling Street) and Damansara (later part of Damansara Road).

=== Yap Ah Loy ===
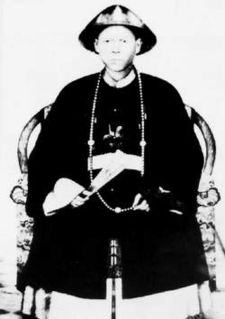
Kapitan Yap Ah Loy

The leaders of the Chinese community, who administered the Chinese settlement and ensured law and order, were conferred the title of Kapitan Cina (Chinese headman) by the Malay chief. Hiu Siew, the owner of a mine in Lukut and early shops in Kuala Lumpur, was chosen as the first Kapitan of Kuala Lumpur. It was however the third Kapitan Cina, Yap Ah Loy, who had the most impact on Kuala Lumpur in its early years. He set up Kuala Lumpur's first school and a shelter for the homeless. Yap also gave Kuala Lumpur a system of frontier justice which effectively maintained law and order, and ensured that Kuala Lumpur became the centre of commerce in Selangor. Kapitan Yap was involved in all aspects of commercial activities of early Kuala Lumpur, including the main market, as well as licensing of brothels, casinos and drinking saloons. Yap's Kuala Lumpur was very much a rough frontier town as Yap himself was a member of the Hai San triad and gang warfare was common, in particular, the conflict between Hai San and the Ghee Hin (based in the Kanching and Rawang area). In 1870, Yap's friend Ah Sze (the early pioneer of Kuala Lumpur) was murdered, presumably by Chong Chong, a headman in Kanching who wanted the Kapitanship of Kuala Lumpur. Yap led his men to Kanching in retaliation, and 12 Chinese and 8 Malays were killed, an event that would become known as 'the Kanching massacre', and Chong Chong was driven out of Kanching.

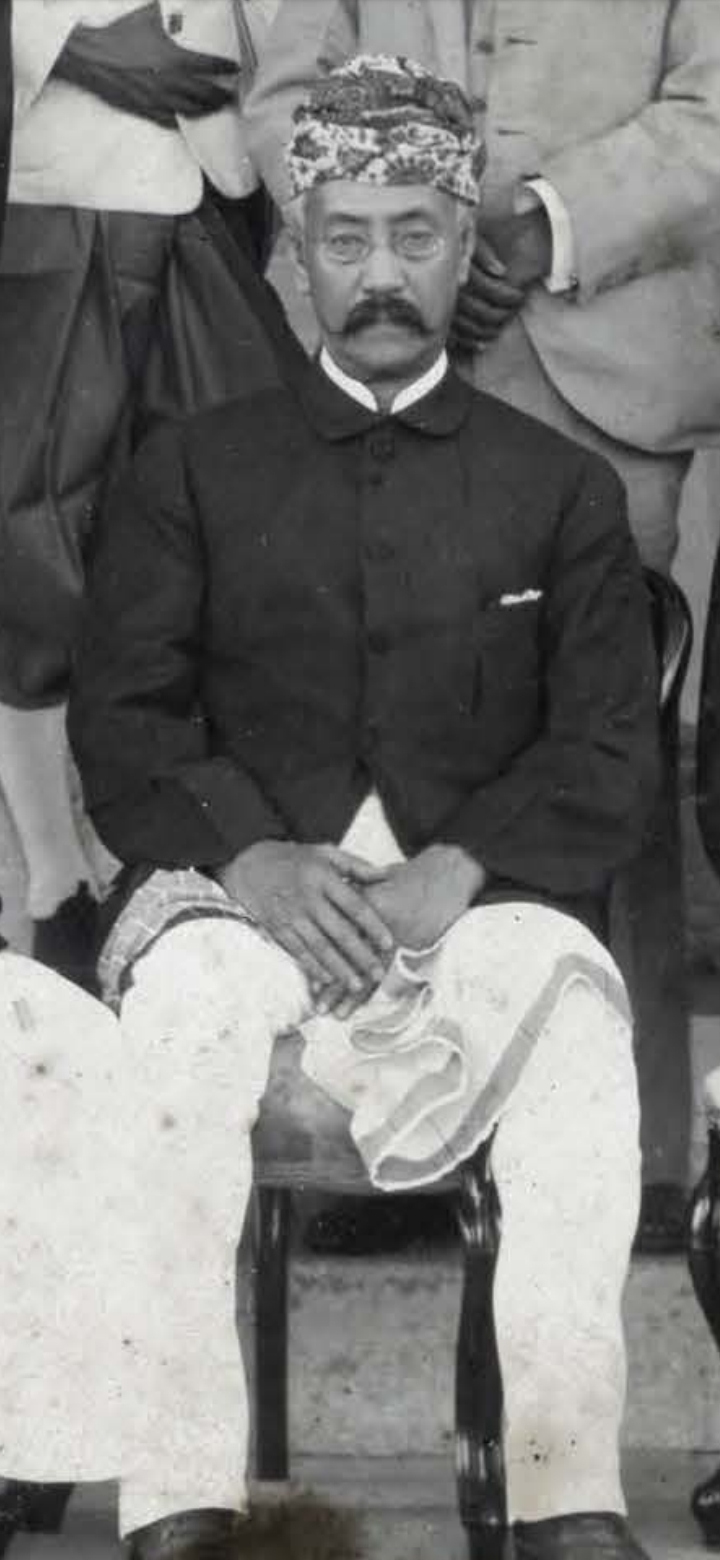
Tengku Kudin

Kuala Lumpur became embroiled in the Selangor Civil War, which was a fight between Selangor princes for political power and the revenue of tin mines. Chong Chong sided with Raja Mahdi, while Kapitan Yap aligned himself with Tengku Kudin. Yap repelled a couple of attacks on Kuala Lumpur by Raja Mahdi and Chong Chong's forces. In 1872, Raja Asal and Sutan Puasa who were leaders of Mandailing settlers in Selangor switched side to Raja Mahdi, and besieged Tengku Kudin's stronghold at Bukit Nanas. Tengku Kudin's men including European mercenaries attempted to escape, but were caught in Petaling and were killed. Kuala Lumpur was taken and burnt to the ground. Yap managed to escape to Klang where he reassembled a fighting force. Yap and Tengku Kudin then regained Kuala Lumpur with the help of Pahang Malays in 1873. Despite the town's destruction during the Civil War, Yap rebuilt Kuala Lumpur and repopulated the town. Yap also kept the town going through a difficult period when the price of tin slumped mid 1870s, and although he suffered severe losses, a recovery of the price of tin in 1879 would secure the future of Kuala Lumpur.

=== British administration ===
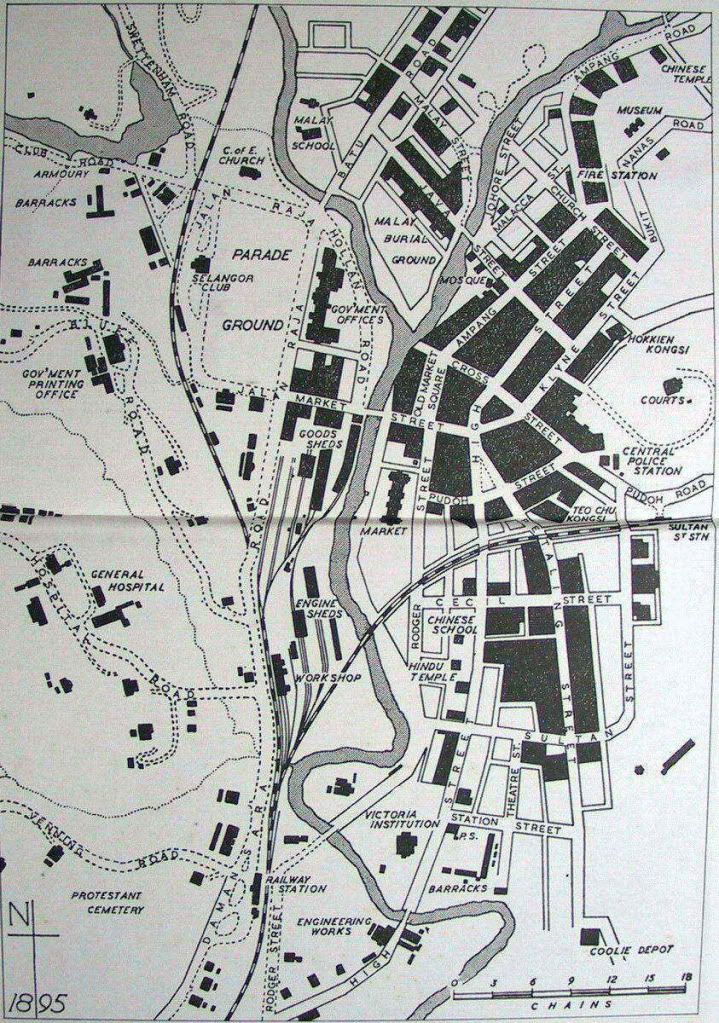
Map of Kuala Lumpur in 1895

In 1874, Sultan Abdul Samad of Selangor accepted a British Resident in a system allowed the British to rule while the Sultan remained the head. In 1880, Kuala Lumpur was made capital of Selangor and the British colonial administration moved from Klang to Kuala Lumpur. In 1880, the state capital of Selangor was moved from Klang to the more strategically advantageous Kuala Lumpur by the colonial administration, and the then British Resident William Bloomfield Douglas decided that the government buildings and living quarters should be located to the west of the river, separate from the Chinese and Malay settlements along the east bank of the Klang River. Government offices and a new police headquarter was built on Bukit Aman, and the Padang was created initially for police training. A police force of 2–300 was established by the British; most of them were Malays recruited from rural Malacca (plus a few Sikhs and Punjabis), and as many of them then brought their families here, they would form a significant part the Malay population in early Kuala Lumpur. The government offices were later moved from Bukit Aman to a more conveniently located Sultan Abdul Samad Building facing the Padang, now known as Merdeka Square, which became the centre of the British colonial administration.

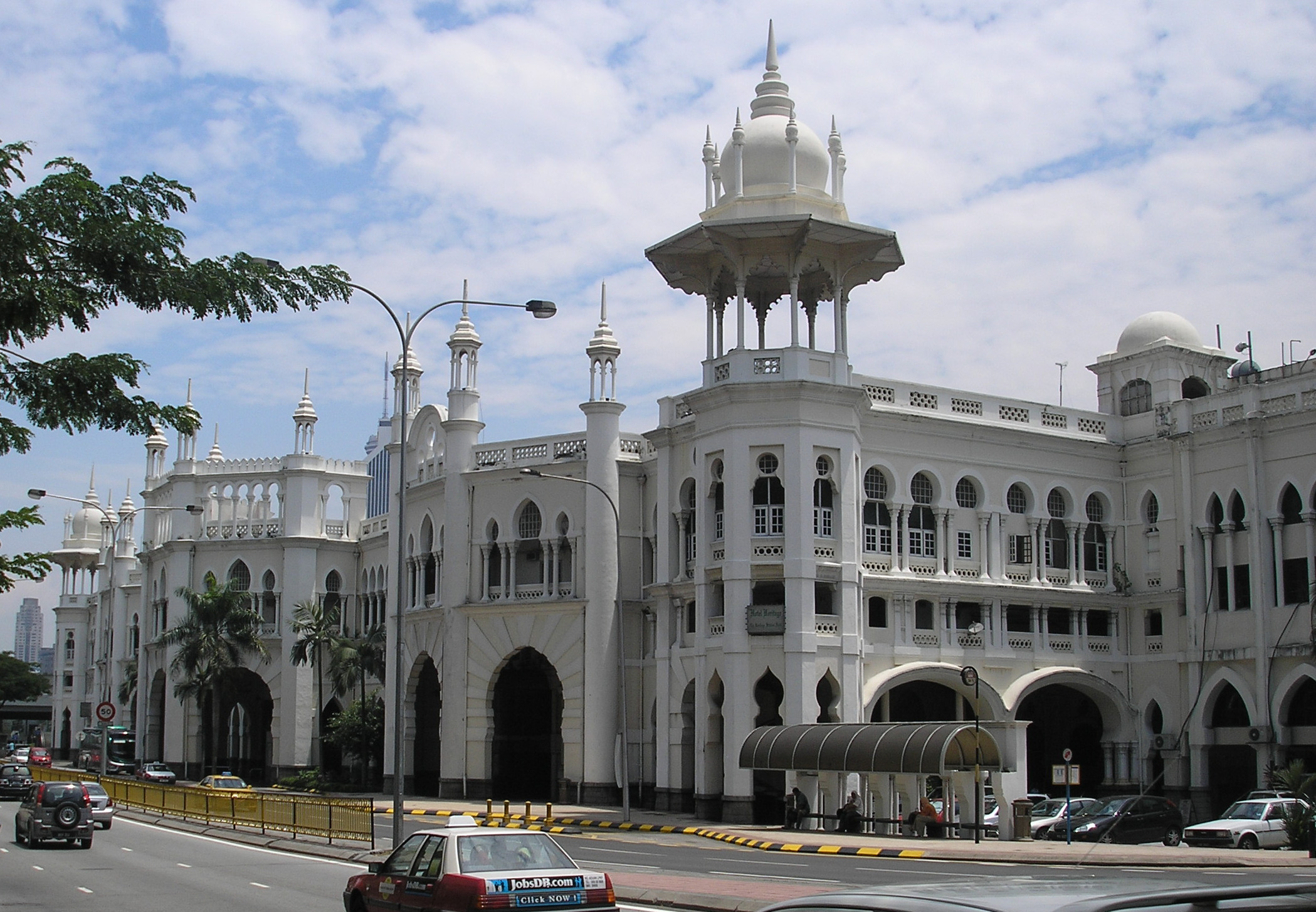
Kuala Lumpur railway station, the building of the railway line lead to rapid population increase

Frank Swettenham, who was appointed the Resident in 1882, has been credited with its rapid growth and development and its transformation into a major urban center. Early Kuala Lumpur was a small town that suffered from many social and political problems – the buildings were made of wood and atap (thatching) that were prone to fire, lack of proper sanitation plagued the town with diseases, and it suffered from a constant threat of flooding. A major outbreak of cholera in late 1870s caused many to flee the town. On 4 January 1881 the entire town was burnt down, and later the same year, the town was severely flooded.

Frank Swettenham, on becoming the British Resident, began improving the town by cleaning up the streets. He also stipulated that buildings should be constructed of brick and tile so that they would be less flammable. He ordered that Kuala Lumpur be rebuilt with wider streets, and the houses to be replaced with buildings in brick and tile street by street. The rebuilding program lasted about five years. Kapitan Yap Ah Loy bought a sprawling piece of real estate to set up a brick industry for the rebuilding of Kuala Lumpur; this place is the eponymous Brickfields. Destroyed atap buildings were replaced with brick and tiled ones, and many of the new brick buildings are characterised by the "five-foot ways" as well as Chinese carpentry work. This resulted in a distinct eclectic shop house architecture typical to this region.

Swettenham also initiated the construction of a railway line between Klang and Kuala Lumpur, opened in 1886, which increased accessibility to Kuala Lumpur and spurred the rapid growth of the town. The population grew from 4,500 in 1884 to 20,000 in 1890. When the Federated Malay States were incorporated with Swettenham as the Resident-General in 1896, Kuala Lumpur was made the capital.

As most of central KL grew in an organic fashion originally without significant planning in the early years, so the streets in the older parts of town are narrow, winding and congested. The architecture in this section is a unique colonial type, a hybrid of European and Chinese forms. As the population grew, it also created pressure on the management of sanitation, waste disposal and other health issue. A Sanitary Board was therefore created on 14 May 1890 which was responsible for sanitation, upkeep of roads, lighting of street, planning and other functions. This would eventually become the Kuala Lumpur Municipal Council.

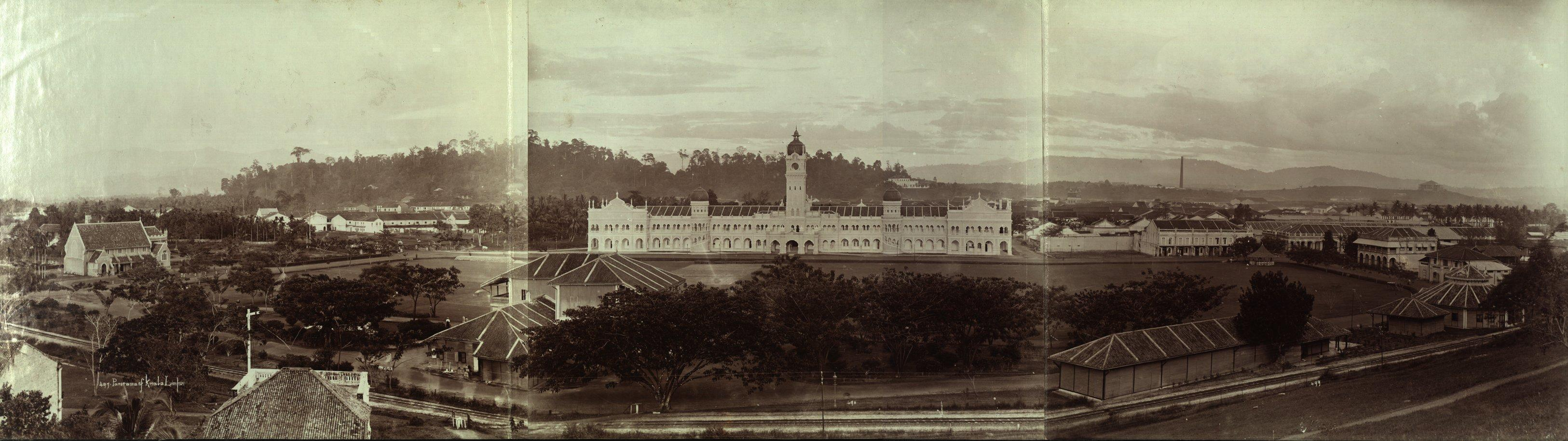
Sultan Abdul Samad Building and the Padang, Kuala Lumpur, circa 1900. Also visible in the foreground is the old Selangor Club, later rebuilt.

=== Expansion in the 20th century ===
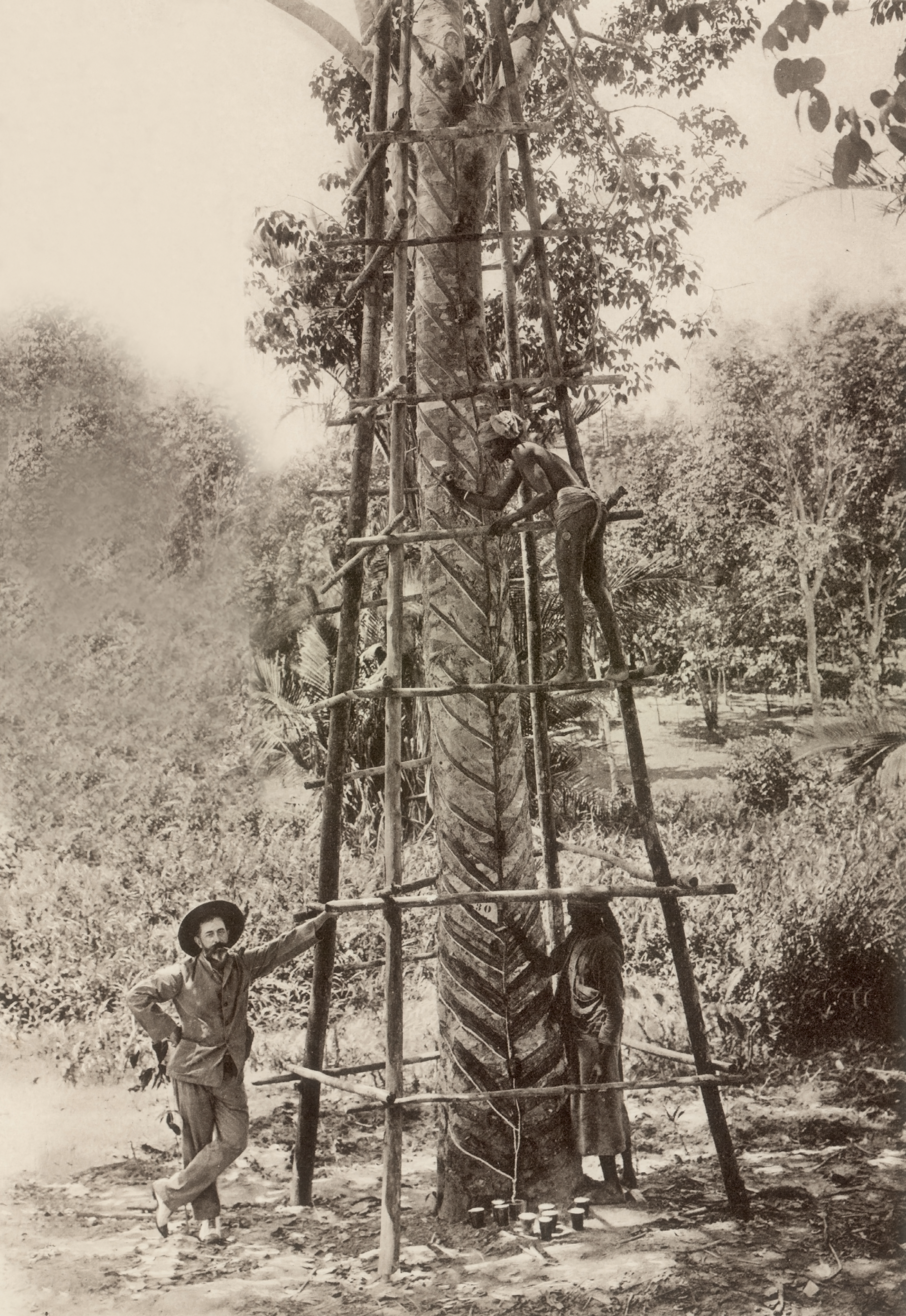
Rubber tapping in Malaya, circa 1910

Kuala Lumpur grew from a small settlement to become Malaysia's biggest city in the 20th century. Kuala Lumpur was only 0.65 km^{2} in 1895, but it expanded to 20 km^{2} in 1903, and by the time it became a municipality in 1948 it had expanded to 93 km^{2}, and then after independence to 243 km^{2} in 1974 as a Federal Territory.

The development of the rubber industry in Selangor fueled by the demand for car tyres in the early 20th century led to a boom of the town, with the population of Kuala Lumpur increasing from 30,000 in 1900 to 80,000 in 1920, and over 110,000 by 1931. In the late 19th and early 20th centuries, the commercial activities of Kuala Lumpur were primarily run by Chinese businessmen such as Loke Yew, then the richest and most influential Chinese of Kuala Lumpur; Choo Kia Peng, the successor to Loke Yew; Yap Kwan Seng, the last Capitan of Kuala Lumpur; Cheong Yoke Choy, one of Loke Yew's nephews and trusted lieutenants; and Eu Tong Sen. The growth of the rubber industry led to an influx of foreign capital and planters, with new companies and industries becoming established in Kuala Lumpur, and other companies previously based in Singapore and elsewhere, such as Guthrie, Harrisons and Crosfield, and Dunlop also finding a presence here. However, due to the nature of the rubber industry – the rubber trees take some years before they can be tapped, in a period of boom this led to over-planting, which would then be followed by over-production of rubber some years later when the trees started to be tapped – it resulted in cycles of boom and bust, leading to widespread unemployment, for example in the early 1920s.

A major flood hit Kuala Lumpur in 1926. In an attempt to reduce the risk of flooding, part of the Klang River below the Gombak-Klang confluence was shortened and straightened. A channel (part of which runs beside the present Jalan Syed Putra) with flood retention banks was dug to divert the river and it was completed in 1932.

=== Japanese occupation ===
Kuala Lumpur was occupied by Japanese from 11 January 1942 to 15 August 1945. The period, called "3 years and 8 months", almost halted the economy of Kuala Lumpur. The occupation of the city resulted in significant loss of lives; at least 5,000 Chinese were killed in Kuala Lumpur in just a few weeks of the occupation by Japanese forces, and thousands of Indians were sent as forced labour to work on the Burma Railway where a large number died.

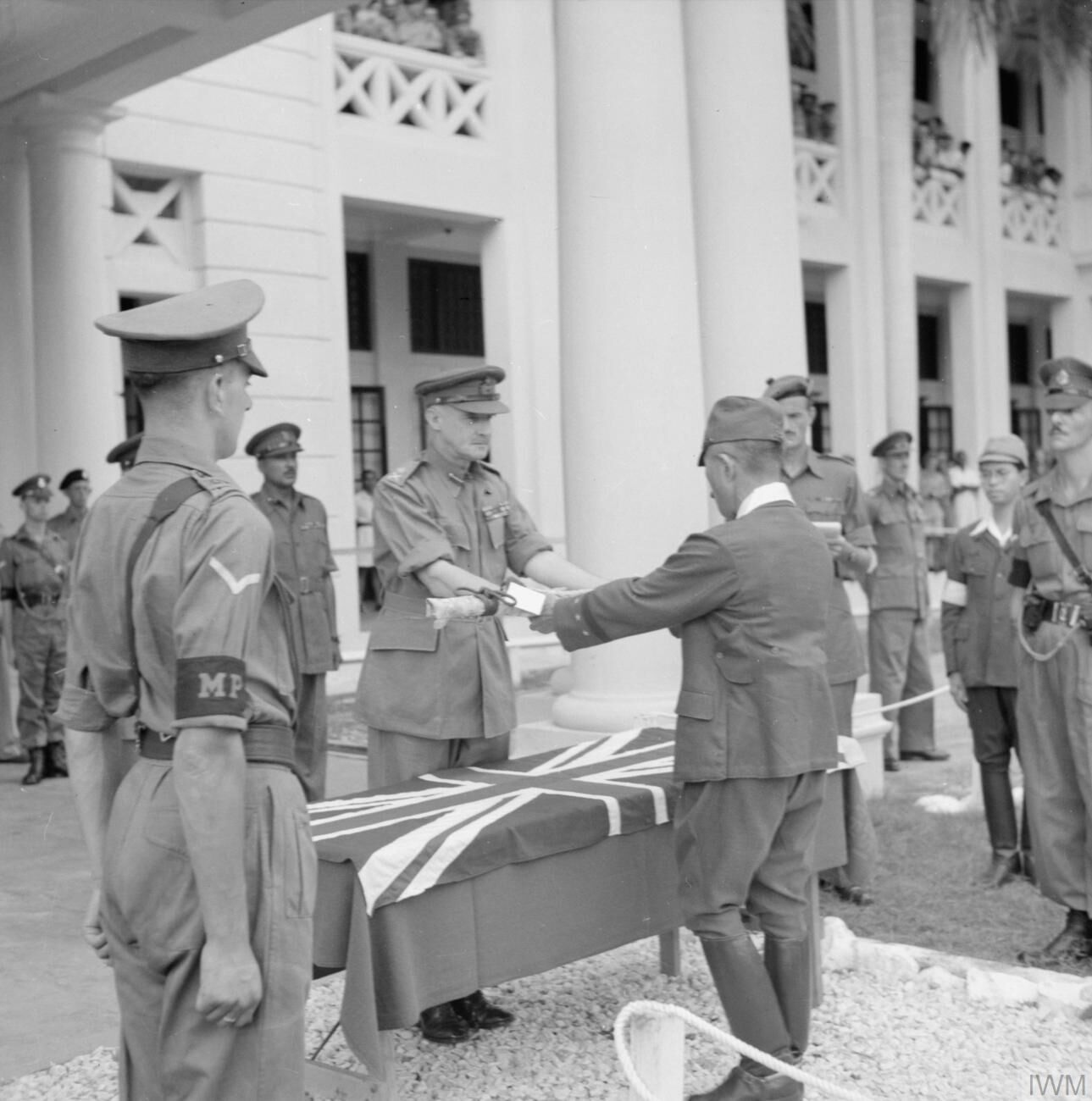
Formal ceremony of Japanese surrender in Kuala Lumpur in 1946

During the Japanese Occupation, the military launched numerous policies such as the selective policy where the ethnic Chinese were treated poorly because they supported the Chinese Government during the First Sino-Japanese War in 1895 and the Second Sino-Japanese War in 1937. On the other hand, the ethnic Malays were treated well with promise of independence after the war so that they would co-operate in order for the Japanese to continue administering Kuala Lumpur. The Japanese Social Policy was implemented during the Japanese Military Administratives; in this policy, all English and Chinese schools were ordered to close down and every morning in schools, Kimigayo (the Japanese National Anthem) had to be sung to show loyalty to the Japanese Emperor.

While the Japanese Military occupies Kuala Lumpur, the Japanese Military Yen or commonly known as Banana notes were introduced. Due to currency without reserves issued by the Japanese Imperial Army administration and over printing of Japanese Military Yen, hyper-inflation occurred and food rationing became the norm of daily lives.

United States Army Air Forces heavy bombers bombed the Central Railroad Repair Shops in Kuala Lumpur on 18 February and 10 March 1945. After the atomic bombings of Hiroshima and Nagasaki in August 1945, the commander of the 29th Army Lieutenant-General Ishiguro surrendered to the British army on 13 September 1945. Another ceremony was held on 22 February 1946 in Kuala Lumpur for the formal surrender by the commander in chief of the Japanese Seventh Area Army in Singapore and Malaysia, Seishirō Itagaki, to the British administration

=== Malayan Union ===
After the Japanese surrendered, the British Military Administration returned to Kuala Lumpur. On 1 April 1946, the British officially declared the Malayan Union in King's House (now known as Carcosa Seri Negara).

During the Malayan Emergency, when the colonial government of Malaya was preoccupied with the Communist insurgency, New Villages were established on the outskirts of the city in the 1950s in an attempt to control covert support for the guerrillas. The largest of these is Jinjang New Village in Kepong to the north of Kuala Lumpur. As people were moved from regions such as Ulu Klang and Lower Ampang into these new villages, the policy also increased the population of Kuala Lumpur.

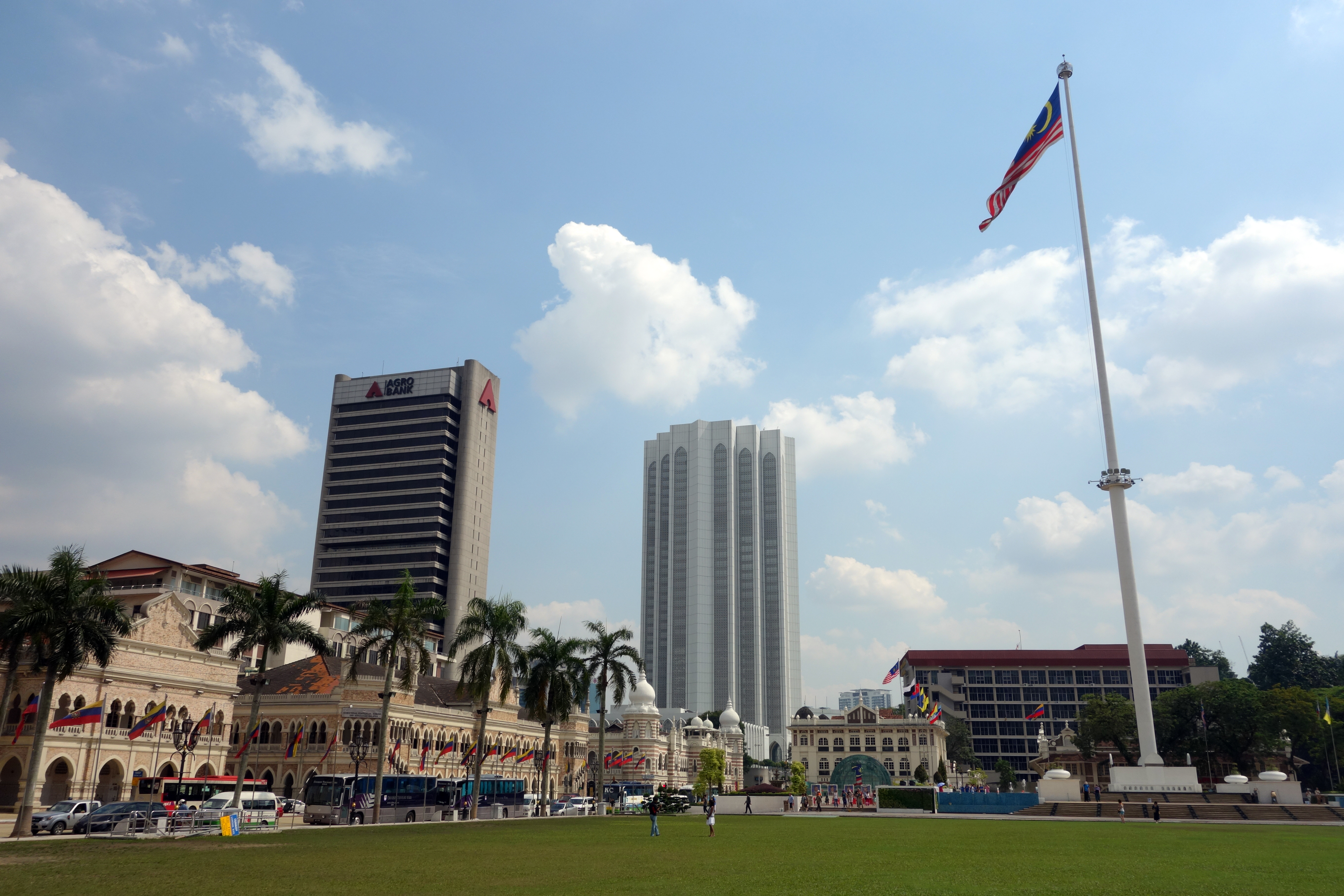
Dataran Merdeka (Independence Square) in central Kuala Lumpur, where the independence of Malaya was declared in 1957

.

=== Pre-independence elections ===
Kuala Lumpur was one of the first Malayan cities to hold an election. The first municipal election was held on 16 February 1952; the United Malays National Organisation and Malaysian Chinese Association formed an ad hoc alliance to contest the election, winning 9 seats out of 12 seats. The two parties would later formalise their relationship with the formation of the Alliance Party together with the Malaysian Indian Congress in 1954 to contest the first Malayan General Election in 1955.

=== Independence day ===
Kuala Lumpur gained historical significance again in 1957 when the first Malayan flag was raised on the grounds of the cricket field, Merdeka Square, to mark the country's independence from British rule. Kuala Lumpur came of age in 1974, when it was formally detached from its mother state of Selangor and made into a unit of its own called the Federal Territory.

== Post-independence era (1957–1990) ==
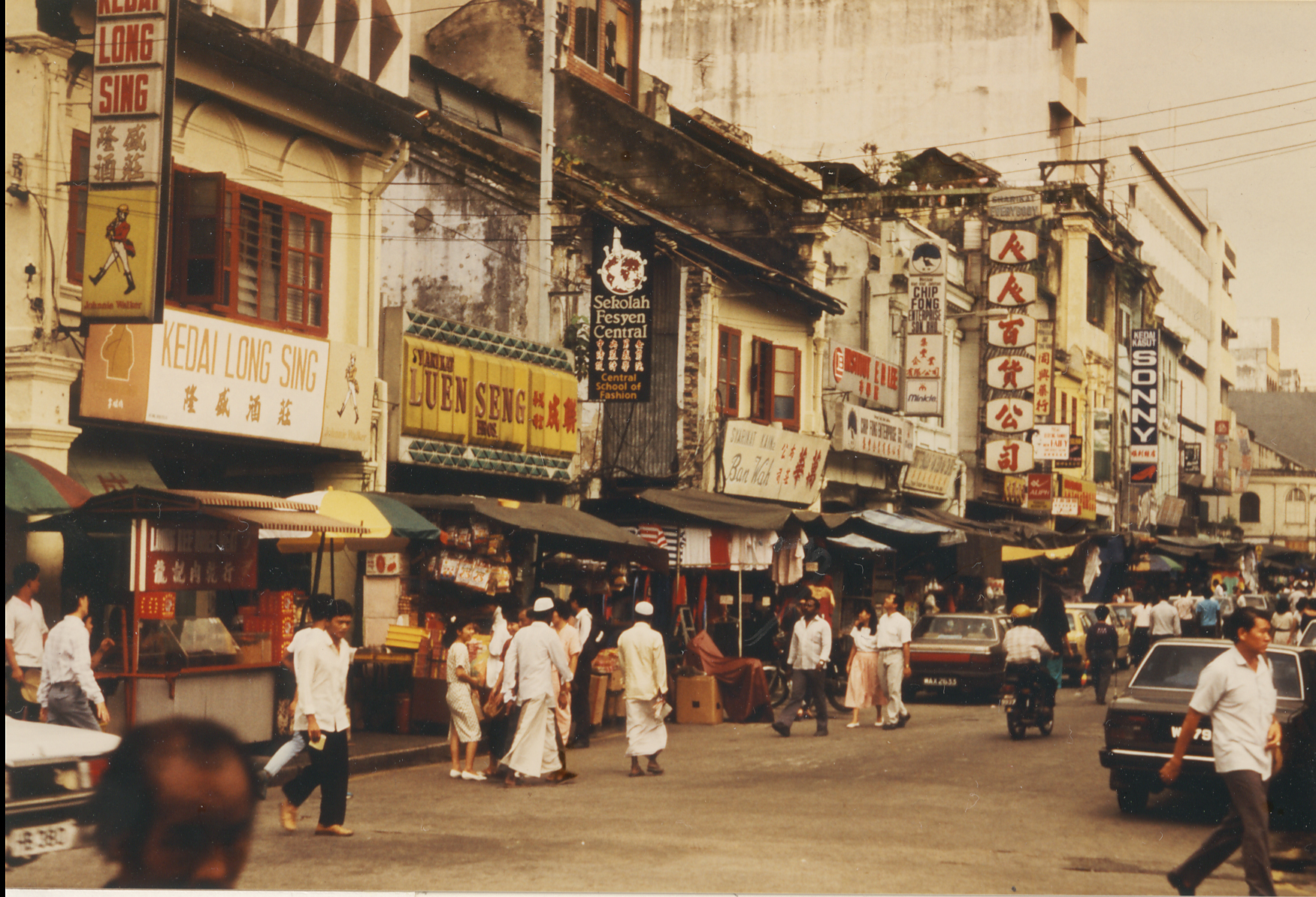
Jalan Sultan Ismail in 1989.

After independence in 1957, Kuala Lumpur became the capital of the Federation of Malaya and continued to be the capital of the enlarged Federation of Malaysia in 1963. For the occasion of independence, a large stadium, Stadium Merdeka (Independence Stadium), was built, where Malaysia's first prime Minister, Tunku Abdul Rahman, declared Malaya's independence in front of a massive crowd. The Union Jack was lowered from the flagpole at Dataran Merdeka (Independence Square), and the Malayan flag was raised.

In 1969, parts of the city were damaged in one of the worst racial riots in Malaysian history, known as the May 13 incident. The violence was the result of Malaysian Malays being dissatisfied with their socio-political status. The riots caused the deaths of 196 people, most of them Chinese. The Malaysian parliament was suspended for two years until 1971, and led to major changes in the country's economic policy to promote and prioritise Malay economic development over that of the other ethnicities.

On 1 February 1972, Kuala Lumpur was given city status under the City of Kuala Lumpur Act 1971, becoming the second city in Malaysia after George Town, and the first city in Malaysia after Malaya's independence in 1957.

On 1 February 1974, with the commencement of Constitution (Amendment) (No. 2) Act 1973 and the signing of the 1974 Federal Territory of Kuala Lumpur Agreement, Kuala Lumpur seceded from Selangor and the city became a Federal Territory (Malay: Wilayah Persekutuan), thereby placing it under the direct control of the federal government.

On 5 August 1975, The terrorist organisation named Japanese Red Army, took more than 50 hostages at the AIA building, which housed several embassies. The hostages included the United States consul and the Swedish chargé d'affaires. The gunmen won the release of five imprisoned comrades and flew with them to Libya. The organisation carried out many attacks and assassinations in the 1970s, including the Lod Airport massacre in Tel Aviv three years earlier.

== Contemporary era (1990–present) ==
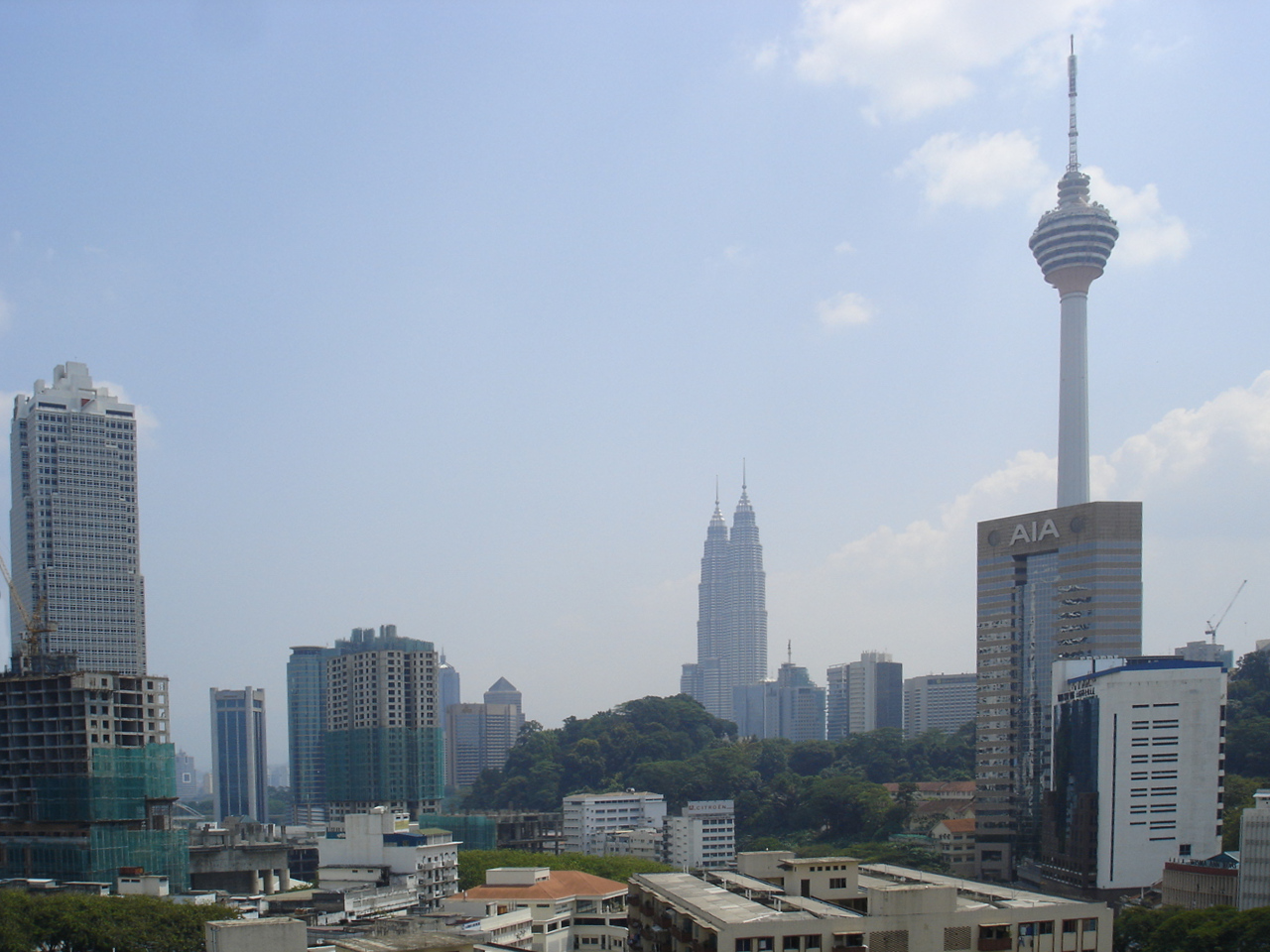
Petronas Twin Towers and the KL Tower

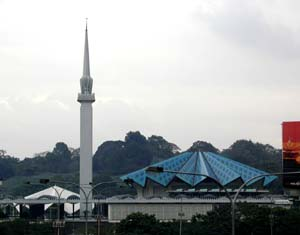
Masjid Negara (National Mosque), one of the largest mosques in East Asia

Starting from the early 1990s, Kuala Lumpur experience considerable development since the Asian Economic Boom of the early 1990s (when economic growth was averaging at 10%). Under the initiative the Prime Minister Mahathir Mohamad at globalisation, major urban developments in the Klang Valley has resulted in an extended Kuala Lumpur Metropolitan Area. This area, which extends from the Federal Territory of Kuala Lumpur westward to Port Klang, east to the Titiwangsa Mountains as well as to the north and south and includes other administratively separate towns and cities such as Klang, Shah Alam, Putrajaya and others, is known as Greater Kuala Lumpur. Notable projects undertaken within Kuala Lumpur itself include the development of a new Kuala Lumpur City Centre around Jalan Ampang. Skyscrapers have shot up and Kuala Lumpur, formerly a languid colonial outpost, has become one of the most lively, advanced and vibrant cities in South East Asia.

The stretch of road facing Dataran Merdeka is perhaps the most famous road in Kuala Lumpur. The Sultan Abdul Samad building with its signature copper domes and Moorish architecture stands here, as does one of the tallest flagpoles in the world, which stands in the Dataran Merdeka itself. Up until 2004, the superior courts of the federation (the Court of Appeal and the Federal Court) were housed in the Sultan Abdul Samad Building, since then the Court of Appeal and the Federal Court have moved to the Palace of Justice in Putrajaya. The Dayabumi building is visible, being down the road. This area used to be the focal point of Malaysia's Independence Day parade, which was televised all over Malaysia. In 2003 however, the parade was moved to the boulevard in Putrajaya, keeping with Putrajaya's status as the new administrative capital of Malaysia. The white Police Headquarters located atop Bukit Aman (literally "Peace Hill") also faces the Dataran.

The rest of the city has mostly developed in the standard way, similar with other capital cities in other countries. Aware of this, architects have been urged to incorporate traditional design elements into their work. Notable examples of this fusion are the Dayabumi building, Kuala Lumpur's first skyscraper, the Tabung Haji Building and Menara Telekom, both designed by local architect Hijjas Kasturi, and the Petronas Twin Towers.

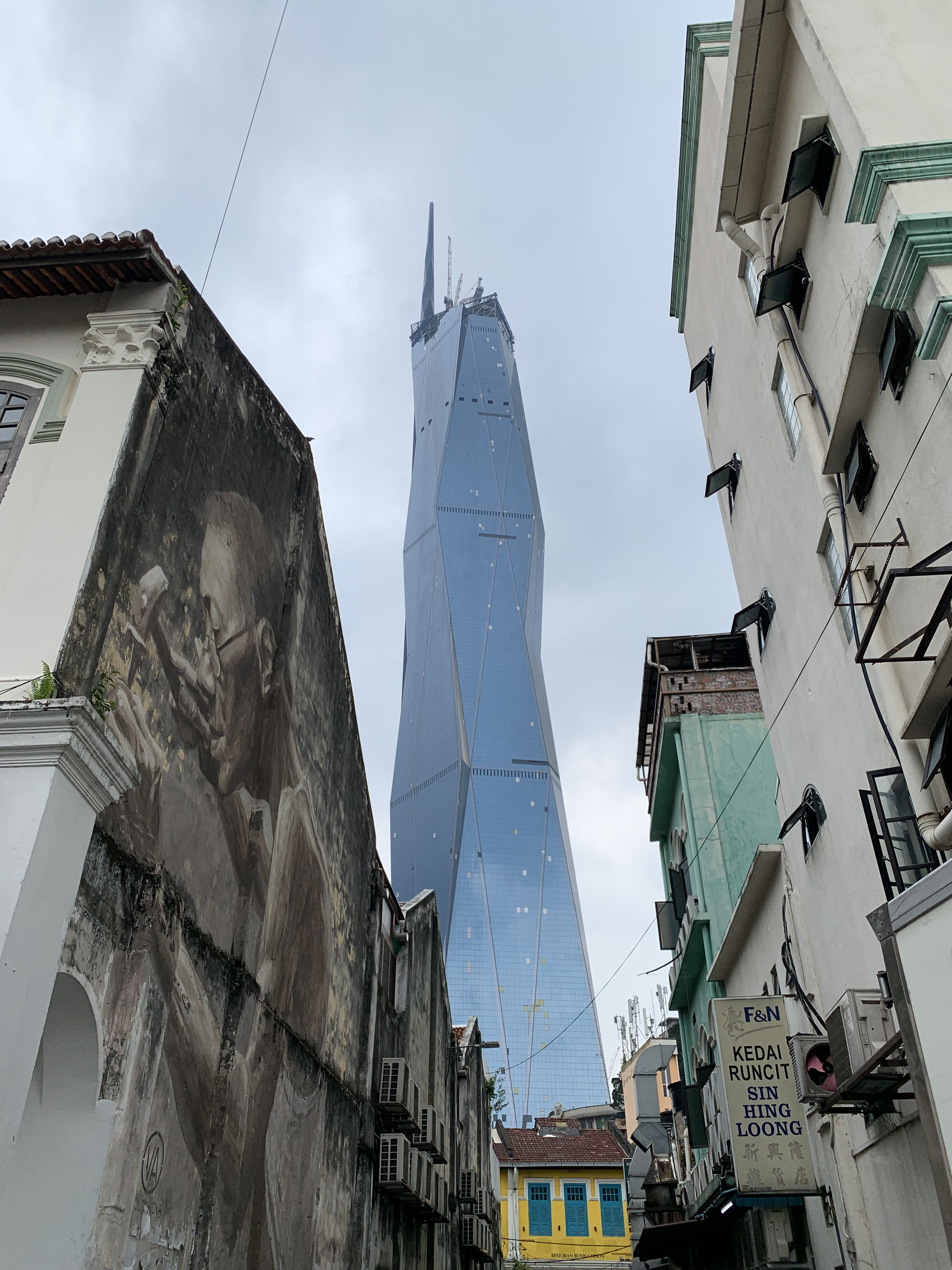
Merdeka 118 in 2022.

The accelerated development of the city has seen older structures demolished or altered to make way for shopping centres, offices and residential developments. Efforts to conserve heritage buildings in the city exist but are limited. While preservation of landmarks such as the Sultan Abdul Samad Building, Kuala Lumpur Railway Station, Carcosa Seri Negara and Central Market, as well as a handful of shophouses and homes, are active, a fraction of pre-independence buildings in the area have been poorly maintained, misused, neglected, razed in fires or demolished through the 1990s and 2000s (decade). Recent controversy has been raised with a (presently dropped) government proposal in mid-2006 to acquire the operational Coliseum Theatre and convert it into a cultural heritage center, as well as the government's inaction toward the demolition of the Bok House in late 2006.

In November 2007, two of the largest political rallies since 1998 took place in the city—the Bersih rally on 10 November, and the HINDRAF rally on 25 November. The Bersih rally was organised by a number of non-governmental organisations and opposition political parties to demand electoral reform in the country, whereby about 50,000 people took to the streets. The HINDRAF rally was organised by HINDRAF (Hindu Rights Action Front) and was attended by at least 10,000 mainly ethnic Indian protesters demanding equal social and economic rights from the Bumiputras.

Kuala Lumpur was voted as one of top ten cities in Asia by a leading Asia magazine Asiaweek.
