= Perlis (Federal Legislative Council constituency) =

Perlis constituency

Defunct federal constituency
- Legislature: Dewan Rakyat
- Constituency created: 1955
- Constituency abolished: 1959
- First contested: 1955
- Last contested: 1955

Perlis was a federal constituency in Perlis, Malaysia, that has been represented in the Federal Legislative Council from 1955 to 1959.

The federal constituency was created in the 1955 redistribution and is mandated to return a single member to the Federal Legislative Council under the first past the post voting system.

== History ==
It was abolished in 1959 when it was redistributed.

=== Representation history ===
Members of Parliament for Perlis
| Parliament | Years | Member | Party | Vote Share |
Constituency created
| 1st | 1955–1959 | Sheikh Ahmad Mohd Hashim (شيخ احمد محمد هشيم) | Alliance (UMNO) | 17,769; 66.84% |
Constituency abolished, split into Perlis Utara and Perlis Selatan

=== State constituency ===
| Parliamentary constituency | State constituency | | | | | | |
| Parliamentary constituency | 1955–1959* | 1959–1974 | 1974–1986 | 1986–1995 | 1995–2004 | 2004–2018 | 2018–present |
|---|---|---|---|---|---|---|---|
| Perlis | Arau | | | | | | |
| Perlis | Beseri-Titi Tinggi | | | | | | |
| Perlis | Kangar | | | | | | |
| Perlis | Kuala Perlis | | | | | | |
| Perlis | Kurong Anai | | | | | | |
| Perlis | Mata Ayer | | | | | | |
| Perlis | Paya | | | | | | |
| Perlis | Sanglang | | | | | | |
| Perlis | Utan Aji | | | | | | |

== Election results ==
Malayan general election, 1955: Perlis
| Party | Candidate | Votes | % |
|---|---|---|---|
| Alliance | Sheikh Ahmad Mohd Hashim | 17,769 | 66.84 |
| Independent | Mat Kassim | 8,814 | 33.16 |
| Total valid votes | | 26,583 | 100.00 |
| Total rejected ballots | | | |
| Unreturned ballots | | | |
| Turnout | | 26,583 | 85.93 |
| Registered electors | | 30,936 | |
| Majority | | 8,955 | 33.68 |
This was a new constituency created.
Source(s): The Straits Times.
