= Ahmad Tuan Hussein =

Malayan politician (1906–1978)

Ahmad Tuan Hussein (17 June 1906 – 25 February 1978) was a Malayan politician and Islamic religious teacher. He was born in Alor Setar, Kedah with Islamic teaching families.

He served in the pre-independence Federal Legislative Council of Malaya, having been elected to the chamber in the 1955 election for the seat of Krian, Perak. He was a member of the party later known as the Pan-Malaysian Islamic Party (PAS).

Of the 52 Council members elected in 1955, Ahmad was the only one not from the Alliance coalition. He was also the first PAS candidate ever elected to a legislative assembly.

After not contesting the next election, he continue to serve Islamic teaching until he died in 1978 at Penang.
