= 1952 Malayan local elections =

The local elections were held in a common date (6 December 1952) for all six municipal and town councils in the Federation of Malaya.

== Municipal election ==
=== George Town ===
Date: 6 December 1952; Electorate: 17,544; Turnout: 51.8%
| Wards | Elected councillor | Elected party | Votes | Majority | Opponent(s) | Party | Votes |
Radicals 1 (6) | UMNO-Muslim League 1 (2) | Labour 1 (1)
| Jelutong | 1. A. Raja Gopal | Labour | | | S. Mohd. Baboo; Aziz Ibrahim | UMNO-Muslim League; Radicals | |
| Kelawei | 1. C. O. Lim | Radicals | 666 | 133 | A. Sabapathy; S. M. Hussain | Labour; UMNO-Muslim League | |
| Tanjong | 1. A. M. Abu Bakar | UMNO-Muslim League | | | Wong Kok Kee; N. Ponnudurai | Radicals; Labour | |

=== Kuala Lumpur ===
Date: 16 February 1952; Electorate: 11,005; Turnout: 68%
| Wards | Elected councillor | Elected party | Votes | Majority | Opponent(s) | Party | Votes |
UMNO-MCA 9 (9) | IMP 2 (2) | Independent 1 (1)
| Bangsar | 1. S. C. E. Singam; 2. K. L. Devaser; 3. Devaki Krishnan | Ind. IMP; IMP | 718; 577; 570 | 141 | 4. Ahmad Mahmood; 5. Raja Mohamed Raja Alang; 6. S. Karalasingam; 7. T. Rajendra; 8. Elsie Somasundram | UMNO-MCA; UMNO-MCA; Labour; IMP; UMNO-MCA | 517; 508; 466; 422; 232 |
| Imbi | 1. Chan Chee Hong; 2. Cheah Ewe Keat; 3. Douglas Lee | UMNO-MCA; UMNO-MCA; UMNO-MCA | 840; 833; 778 | 7 | 4. K. C. Chia; 5. T. R. Marks; 6. Chua Boon Guan; 7. E. Ramachandram; 8. Ho Tee Chim | Labour; IMP; IMP; IMP; Labour | 645; 530; 452; 419; 377 |
| Petaling | 1. Chan Kwong Hon; 2. Ong Yoke Lin; 3. Lee Yoon Thim | UMNO-MCA; UMNO-MCA; UMNO-MCA | 871; 856; 750 | 15 | 4. Ng Kok Thoy; 5. Leong Hoe Yeng; 6. Loke Soh Lip; 7. A. Tharmalingam; 8. V. G. T. Singam; 9. Yap Chong Kuen | IMP; IMP; IMP; Ind. Ind. Labour | 323; 320; 299; 299; 251; 115 |
| Sentul | 1. Abdullah Yassin; 2. Yahaya Sheikh Ahmad; 3. Mohamed Salleh Hakim | UMNO-MCA; UMNO-MCA; UMNO-MCA | 1,616; 1,296; 1,243 | 320 | 4. Abdul Aziz Ishak; 5. Mohamed Tahir Kuteh; 6. K. V. Thaver; 7. Pawanchick Mohamed | IMP; IMP; IMP; Rentpayers | 1,151; 834; 744; 420 |

Date: 6 December 1952; Electorate: 13,503; Turnout: 53%
| Wards | Elected councillor | Elected party | Votes | Majority | Opponent(s) | Party | Votes | Electorate | Turnout |
UMNO-MCA 3 (9) | IMP 1 (2) | Independent 0 (1)
| Bangsar | 1. Devaki Krishnan | IMP | | | 2. Foong Soon Seng | UMNO-MCA | | | |
| Imbi | 1. Douglas Lee | UMNO-MCA | | | 2. K. C. Chin | Labour | | | |
| Petaling | 1. Lee Yoon Thim | UMNO-MCA | | 168 | 2. A. Tharmalingam | Labour | | | |
| Sentul | 1. Raja Mohamad Raja Alang | UMNO-MCA | | | 2. Goh Swee Seng | IMP | | 4,541 | 38% |

=== Malacca ===
Date: 6 December 1952; Electorate: 8,334; Turnout:
| Wards | Elected councillor | Elected party | Votes | Majority | Opponent(s) | Party | Votes | Electorate |
UMNO-MCA 2 (2) | Labour 1 (3) | Progressive 0 (3) | Independent 0 (1)
| Bukit China | 1. Amy Joseph | Labour | | | Mohd. Yusoff Sulong | UMNO-MCA | | 3,217 |
| Fort | 1. Chan Geok Eng | UMNO-MCA | | | Wee Hock Chye; S. Shunmugam | Labour; Progressive | | 2,401 |
| Tranquerah | 1. Goh Kay Seng | UMNO-MCA | | | Allan Acton; Hashim Abdul Ghani | Labour; Progressive | | 2,716 |

== Town councils election ==
=== Bandar Maharani, Muar ===
Date: 6 December 1952; Electorate: Turnout:
| Wards | Elected councillor | Elected party | Votes | Majority | Opponent(s) | Party | Votes |
UMNO-MCA 7 (7) | ?
| Maharani | 1. 2. 3. | | | | Ahmad Ariffin; Ho Koon Toh; Ja'afar A. Manan; Lim Ah Sitt; Sulaiman Ninam Shah | | |
| Parit Stongkat | 1. 2. 3. | | | | A. Jabbar A. Majid; Chan Shi Shi; Chua Huck Yew; Ibrahim M. Yunos; Sheikh Ahmad Said | | |
| Sultan Ibrahim | 1. 2. 3. | | | | Fatimah M. Yunos; Ashari Abdullah; H. N. McLeod; Omar Ahmad; Shahdan M. Salleh | | |

=== Bandar Penggaram, Batu Pahat ===
Date: 6 December 1952; Electorate: Turnout:
| Wards | Elected councillor | Elected party | Votes | Majority | Opponent(s) | Party | Votes | Turnout |
UMNO-MCA 5 (5) | ?
| Gunong Soga | 1. 2. 3 | | | | Abu Bakar Haron; Ahmad Abbas; S. C. MacIntyre; Syed Ahmad Alwee; Tan Peng Koon | | | 87% |
| Jalan Sultanah | 1. 2. 3 | | | | Ahmad Daud; Frank Tan Ah Mong; Ismail Abu Bakar; Syed Mustaffa; Syed; Tan Joo Soon | | | |
| Kampong Petani | 1. 2. 3 | | | | Abdul Samad Puteh; Taha Zakaria; Kang Kock Seng; Sulaiman Abdul Rahman; Zahrah Mohamed Taib | | | |

=== Johore Bahru ===
Date: 6 December 1952; Electorate: 4,599; Turnout: 84.5%
| Wards | Elected councillor | Elected party | Votes | Majority | Opponent(s) | Party | Votes | Electorate | Turnout |
UMNO-MCA 9 (9)
| Ayer Molek | 1. M. Birchee; 2. Ahmad Mohd. Shah; 3. Wong Sze Ming | UMNO-MCA; UMNO-MCA; UMNO-MCA | 1,097; 1,088; 904 | 9 | 4. Mohamed Arshad Awang; 5. Ong See Jiang; 6. Mohd. Salleh Mustapha; 7. Ahmad A. Hamid; 8. Osman A. Raschid | IMP; IMP; IMP; Ind. PMU | 302; 250; 223; 217; 95 | 1,772 | 82.6% |
| Nong Chik | 1. Ismail Abdul Rahman; 2. Mansoor Bakri; 3. Uda Awang | UMNO-MCA; UMNO-MCA; UMNO-MCA | 1,114; 942; 871 | 172 | 4. Chan Chong Wen; 5. Jamaliah Mustapha; 6. Zaharah Abdul Hamid; 7. Abdul Mubin Abdullah; 8. Abdullah Taib | IMP; IMP; IMP; Ind. Ind. | 416; 380; 303; 260; 247 | 1,771 | 86.5% |
| Tebrau | 1. Sardon Zubir; 2. Syed Abdul Rahman Ahmad; 3. Wong Peng Long | UMNO-MCA; UMNO-MCA; UMNO-MCA | 713; 710; 695 | 3 | 4. K. H. Han; 5. Hussein Abdullah; 6. M. N. Roy | IMP; IMP; IMP | 163; 154; 119 | 1,056 | 84.2% |

== Local councils election ==
=== Pasir Pinji New Village ===
The Pasir Pinji New Village local council election is the first election to be held in Perak in December 1952.
