= Kuala Lumpur Barat (Federal Legislative Council constituency) =

Former constituency in Malaysia

Selangor constituency

Defunct federal constituency
- Legislature: Dewan Rakyat
- Constituency created: 1955
- Constituency abolished: 1959
- First contested: 1955
- Last contested: 1955

Kuala Lumpur Barat was a federal constituency in Selangor, Malaysia, that has been represented in the Federal Legislative Council from 1955 to 1959.

The federal constituency was created in the 1955 redistribution and was mandated to return a single member to the Federal Legislative Council under the first past the post voting system.

== History ==
It was abolished in 1959 when it was redistributed.

=== Representation history ===
Members of Parliament for Kuala Lumpur Barat
Parliament	Years	Member	Party	Vote Share
Constituency created
1st	1955-1959	Omar Ong Yoke Lin (翁毓麟)	Alliance (MCA)	4,667; 66.14%
Constituency abolished, split into Bungsar and Batu

=== State constituency ===
Parliamentary constituency	State constituency						
Parliamentary constituency	1955–59*	1959–1974	1974–1986	1986–1995	1995–2004	2004–2018	2018–present
Kuala Lumpur Barat	Kuala Lumpur Municipality West						
Kuala Lumpur Barat	Kuala Lumpur West						

== Election result ==
Malayan general election, 1955: Kuala Lumpur Barat
Party	Candidate	Votes	%
Alliance	Ong Yoke Lin	4,667	66.14
NEGARA	Abdullah Ibrahim	1,371	19.43
Labour	Tan Tuan Boon	1,018	14.43
Total valid votes		7,056	100.00
Total rejected ballots			
Unreturned ballots			
Turnout		7,056	80.10
Registered electors		8,809	
Majority		3,296	46.71
This was a new constituency created.
Source(s): The Straits Times.
