= Ong Yoke Lin =

Malaysian politician (1917–2010)

Yang Amat Berbahagia Tun Dato' Seri Omar Ong Yoke Lin SSM SPMS SPDK PMN DPMS PPM
- 翁毓麟
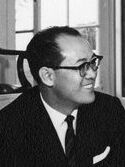
- Ong in the White House, 1962

President of the Dewan Negara
- In office 23 February 1973 – 30 December 1980
- Monarchs: Abdul Halim; Yahya Petra; Ahmad Shah
- Preceded by: Abdul Hamid Khan
- Succeeded by: Ismail Khan

Personal details
- Born: Ong Yoke Lin; 23 July 1917 Kuala Lumpur, Selangor, Federated Malay States
- Died: 1 July 2010 (aged 92) Kuala Lumpur, Malaysia
- Resting place: Makam Pahlawan, Masjid Negara, Kuala Lumpur
- Party: MCA
- Spouse: Aishah Chan-Ong (m. 1974)
- Children: 3

Chinese name
- Chinese: 翁毓麟
- Hanyu Pinyin: Wēng Yùlín
- Hokkien POJ: Ong Io̍k-lîn

Omar Ong Yoke Lin (Chinese: 翁毓麟; 23 July 1917 – 1 July 2010) was a Malaysian Chinese Muslim politician, diplomat and businessman. He was a founding member of the Malaysian Chinese Association, and was a key figure in the country's road to independence. Ong served various positions in the government of Malaya and Malaysia, as a Cabinet minister and ambassador.

== Early life and education ==
Ong Yoke Lin was born on 23 July 1917 in Kuala Lumpur, he attended Pudu Girls' English School and later Victoria Institution, where he was contemporaries of, among others, Yahya Abdul Razak, Lee Siew Choh, Yaacob Latiff and Mahmood Ambak, the father-in-law of Abdullah Ahmad Badawi, the fifth Prime Minister of Malaysia. He passed the London Matriculation in 1935 and trained as a chartered accountant. He intended to read law, but his studies were put on hold by the Japanese occupation of Malaya.

== Politics ==
Omar helped found and joined the Malayan Chinese Association (MCA) in 1949. As a prominent Chinese leader, Ong was selected by the British High Commissioner as a member of the then fully appointed Selangor State Council and Federal Legislative Council.

In 1952, he and Yahya Abdul Razak mooted the idea of an alliance between MCA and the United Malays National Organisation (UMNO) for the Kuala Lumpur Municipal Council elections. This was the precursor to the formal Alliance Party. He contested and won a seat in that election, and was chosen as leader of the Alliance Party in the Municipal Council.

Omar went on to become MCA vice-president and the member of parliament for Hulu Selangor.

In 1955, the Alliance Party won the first ever elections to the Federal Legislative Council under the leadership of Tunku Abdul Rahman. Omar was appointed Minister for Post and Telecoms in the Tunku's first Cabinet. Following the overwhelming support shown for the Alliance Party during the elections and the forming of the government, the Tunku led the Merdeka Delegation to London which successfully negotiated independence from the British. Omar joined the Tunku on his second trip to London in April 1957 to finalise the newly drafted Constitution of Malaya.

=== Independence and the formation of Malaysia ===
On 31 August 1957, Omar was appointed to the first Rahman cabinet of the newly independent Federation of Malaya, holding the Labour and Social Welfare portfolio. In 1959, he became health minister.

During negotiations to unite Malaya, Singapore, Sarawak and British North Borneo (later known as Sabah), Ong was ambassador to the United Nations as Malaya focused on diplomacy amid regional tensions with Indonesia (Konfrontasi).

Following the proclamation of the Federation of Malaysia, Ong continued to serve in the Cabinet as minister without portfolio until 1973. He served concurrently as High Commissioner to Canada in 1966 and as ambassador to Brazil from 1967 to 1972.

In 1973, he was elected President of the Dewan Negara and served until 1980.

== Personal life ==
Tun Omar was married to Toh Puan Dr. Aishah Chan binti Abdullah, also a Chinese Muslim convert and had three children. He converted to Islam in 1961.

== Death ==
Ong died on 1 July 2010 due to old age. He was 92. His body was laid to rest at Makam Pahlawan near Masjid Negara, Kuala Lumpur. He one of the last surviving members of Malaysian founding fathers after Tunku's death in 1990.

== Election results ==
Federal Legislative Council
Year	Constituency	Candidate	Votes	Pct	Opponent(s)	Votes	Pct	Ballots cast	Majority	Turnout
1955	Kuala Lumpur Barat	Ong Yoke Lin (MCA)	4,667	66.14%	Abdullah Ibrahim (NEGARA)	1,371	19.43%	7,056	3,296	80.10%
1955	Kuala Lumpur Barat	Ong Yoke Lin (MCA)	4,667	66.14%	Tan Tuan Boon (Lab)	1,018	14.43%	7,056	3,296	80.10%

Parliament of the Federation of Malaya
Year	Constituency	Candidate	Votes	Pct	Opponent(s)	Votes	Pct	Ballots cast	Majority	Turnout
1959	P078 Ulu Selangor	Ong Yoke Lin (MCA)	6,537	56.07%	Chai Yoke Kin (IND)	5,121	43.93%	11,801	1,416	82.67%

== Honours ==
- Malaya
  - Commander of the Order of the Defender of the Realm (PMN) – Tan Sri (1959)
- Malaysia
  - Recipient of the Malaysian Commemorative Medal (Gold) (PPM) (1965)
  - Grand Commander of the Order of Loyalty to the Crown of Malaysia (SSM) – Tun (1979)
- Selangor
  - Knight Grand Commander of the Order of the Crown of Selangor (SPMS) – Dato' Seri (1973)
  - Knight Commander of the Order of the Crown of Selangor (DPMS) – Dato' (1971)
- Sabah
  - Grand Commander of the Order of Kinabalu (SPDK) – Datuk Seri Panglima (1973)
