= Kanching Falls =

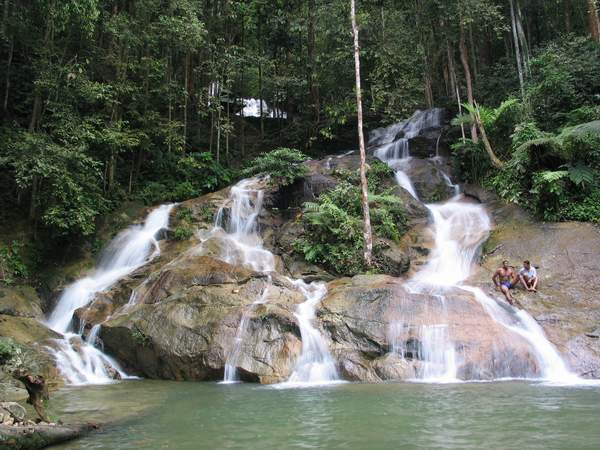
- Main Kanching Fall

- Location within Malaysia
- Location: Kuala Lumpur, Selangor, Malaysia
- Coordinates: 3°18′07″N 101°37′10″EOpenStreetMap
- Number of drops: 7

The Kanching Falls are located between Kuala Lumpur and Rawang in Selangor, Malaysia, and is a popular tourist destination in Kuala Lumpur. The waterfalls consist of seven tiers. A well-maintained recreation park provides access to the lower falls. To reach the upper falls uphill scrambling may be necessary.

== See also ==
- List of waterfalls
