= 1951 Malayan local elections =

The first election in the Federation of Malaya was for the Municipal Council of George Town in Penang held on 1 December 1951.

== Municipal election ==
=== George Town ===
Date: 1 December 1951; Registered voters: 14,514; Turnout: 72.1%
Wards	Elected councillor	Elected party	Votes	Majority
Radicals 6 (6) | Labour 1 (1) | UMNO 1 (1) | Independent 1 (1)
Jelutong	1. N. K. Menon; 2. C. M. Ismail; 3. Cheah Cheng Poh	Radicals; UMNO; Independent	1,149; 987; 949	162
Kelawei	1. Nancy Yeap Chin Poh; 2. A. C. Reutens; 3. C. O. Lim	Radicals; Radicals; Radicals	1,142; 831; 719	311
Tanjong	1. Lee Thean Chu; 2. M. E. M. Meera Hussain; 3. N. Ponnudurai	Radicals; Radicals; Labour	2,241; 2,054; 1,792	187

=== Malacca ===
Date: ~~1 December 1951~~; Electorate: Turnout: nil
Wards	Elected councillor	Elected party	Votes	Majority
Progressive 4 (4) | Labour 3 (3) | UMNO 1 (1) | Independent 1 (1)
Bukit China	1. Ali Maidin; 2. N. M. Ghouse; 3. Amy Joseph	Progressive; Independent; Labour	Unopposed	
Fort	1. S. Shanmugam; 2. J. L. D'Cruz; 3. Ee Yew Kim	Progressive; Labour; Progressive	Unopposed	
Tranquerah	1. P. G. M. G. Mahindasa; 2. V. E. Dias; 3. Hashim Ghani	Progressive; Labour; UMNO	Unopposed	
