= Devaki Krishnan =

Malayan politician (1923–2024)

Yang Berbahagia Tan Sri Devaki Krishnan PSM JMN AMN
- தேவகி கிருஷ்ணன்

Personal details
- Born: Devaki Ayathurai Krishnan; 11 March 1923 Port Dickson, Negeri Sembilan, Federated Malay States, British Malaya
- Died: 20 January 2024 (aged 100)
- Party: Malaysian Indian Congress
- Spouse: P. Krishnan (died 1998)
- Children: 3
- Relatives: Ramanan Ramakrishnan (grandson)

Tan Sri Devaki Ayathurai Krishnan (Tamil: தேவகி கிருஷ்ணன்; 11 March 1923 – 20 January 2024) was a Malaysian politician. She became the first woman elected to public office in Malaysia when she won a seat on the Municipal Council in Kuala Lumpur in 1952. She later became a life member of the Malaysian Indian Congress (MIC). She was the grandmother of Minister of Human Resources and Member of Parliament (MP) for Sungai Buloh Ramanan Ramakrishnan.

== Early life ==
Of Sri Lankan Tamil descent, Krishnan was born in Port Dickson, Negri Sembilan, and was the eldest of six children. Her father was acting controller of Post and Telecoms Malaya, and her mother was a college-trained Tamil school teacher.

Krishnan was educated at St. Mary's School, Kuala Lumpur. Upon graduation she became a school teacher. In 1949, she became an active member of the Selangor Indian Association where she served as chairman of the entertainment and social committee. She was also actively involved in the Women's International Club where she spent her time raising funds for disaster victims.

== Political career ==
=== Independence of Malaya Party ===
In December 1951, Devaki learned from her husband that the community had nominated her to stand for election in the Kuala Lumpur Municipal elections. She was then approached by the late Dato' Onn Jaafar to become a member of the Independence of Malaya Party (IMP). "When I stood as a candidate, I needed help to address the audience, so I would sit with Datuk Onn and another lawyer, R. Ramani, at his office," she recalled, adding that the IMP quarters were in what is now the landmark Sultan Abdul Samad Building. In her 1952 election manifesto, she stated, "I will interest myself particularly in the lot of the women of Kuala Lumpur and in extending the programme of social work already carried out by the municipality." Devaki won election to the Municipal Council, thus becoming the first woman in the country to be elected to public office.

In 1955, she stood for a second term for the municipal council in Bangsar, Kuala Lumpur, and won. After her victory, she was paraded in an open-top car, accompanied by over 50 cars along Jalan Tuanku Abdul Rahman, Kuala Lumpur.

=== Malaysian Indian Congress ===
After the election, Krishnan became a member of the MIC, which was then only a social and welfare association. She contested the Sentul constituency in the 1959 state election under the Alliance ticket but lost.

Krishnan was also a champion for the involvement of women in the Malaysian political system. In those days, most women stayed at home. Wanita (Women) MIC was created in 1975. Devaki recruited women throughout the nation for this branch of the party, with considerable success. "No one taught them to come out as they were shy and had strict upbringings. Wherever they opened branches in MIC, I would open a women's branch. I will take the women aside, talk to them, and tell them what they would gain and how they could go about becoming members." In 1975, Devaki was appointed Wanita MIC secretary and Wanita deputy president in 1984 (a position she held for ten years).

Krishnan was vice-president of the Selangor MIC and chairman of the Selangor Wanita MIC. She became the first chairman of the MIC marriage bureau which was set up in 1984. As chair of the MIC's Syed Putra branch, Krishnan continued to recruit women members and encourage them to register as voters. In August 2021, she was the longest-standing member of the party.

== Social contributions ==
Krishnan joined the Civil Defence Corp in 1953 where she underwent training in firefighting and welfare. She was later made an instructor. Her intensive training paid off during the May 1969 riots when Devaki helped take care of the riot victims and the homeless, numbering around 3,500, at Stadium Merdeka. She was in charge of the medical clinic, and continued serving there for several months until all the victims had been cared for and released.

Krishnan was a committee member of the Indian Welfare Society, the Family Planning Association of Selangor, the Pure Life Society and chairman of the St John's Ambulance Association. She served on the Social Welfare Committee of Kuala Lumpur for over 15 years and was a committee member of the Tengku Budriah Orphanage and the Serendah Boys Home. She was also a Juvenile Court adviser.

Krishnan, an active member in women's organisations, was also an Executive Council member of the National Council of Women's Organisation (NCWO). She was also instrumental in the passing of the Guardianship Act 1999. "We had to canvass even from the opposition, and the National Council of Women's Organisation (NCWO) was the main vehicle. What took 12 years was worth it as it managed to allow single women to take care of their children."

== Personal life ==
Her husband, P. Krishnan, was a wealthy businessman, uninvolved in politics. He died in 1998. They had three children and five grandchildren. Their eldest grandson Ramanan Ramakrishnan was an MIC treasurer and is a Member of Parliament for Sungai Buloh under the Pakatan Harapan banner.

Krishnan turned 100 on 11 March 2023 and died on 20 January 2024.

== Awards and recognition ==
In 1974, Devaki was honoured by Queen Elizabeth II with the Serving Sister of St John Award for her St John's Ambulance activities. In 1985, she was named Tokoh Wanita by the National Council of Women Organisation (NCWO) and Sevai Mamani at the World Hindu Women Conference. She was awarded the 1991 Avon-Tan Sri Fatimah award and Tun Fatimah Award by NCWO for her welfare services. In August 1995, she was conferred the Panglima Setia Mahkota by the Yang di-Pertuan Agong, entitling her to use the title Tan Sri. She became the first Malaysian Sri Lankan woman to receive the award.

=== Honours of Malaysia ===
- Malaya
  - Member of the Order of the Defender of the Realm (AMN) (1961)
- Malaysia
  - Companion of the Order of the Defender of the Realm (JMN) (1990)
  - Commander of the Order of Loyalty to the Crown of Malaysia (PSM) – Tan Sri (1995)

== Sources ==
- First woman to stand for election, Sunday Mail, 8 August 2003.
- Spirit of the Pioneer, The Star, 8 July 2007.
- Mothers of substance, The Star, 20 August 2007.
- Spirit of the pioneer, The Star, 29 August 2007.
