= Independence of Malaya Party =

Political Party

- President: Onn Jaafar
- Founder: Onn Jaafar
- Founded: 16 September 1951
- Dissolved: 16 March 1954
- Split from: UMNO
- Succeeded by: Parti Negara
- Headquarters: Kuala Lumpur, Malaysia
- Ideology: Multiculturalism; Malayan independence
- Colours: Grey

The Independence of Malaya Party (Malay: Parti Kemerdekaan Malaya) was a political party in British-ruled Malaya that stood for political independence. Founded by Onn Ja'afar after he left UMNO in 1951, it opposed the UMNO policy of Malay supremacy

== History ==
The party were formed on 16 September 1951 at Hotel Majestic (Kuala Lumpur), fast forward from initial date of 22 September. The party received backing from communal leaders, including Tan Cheng Lock, president of Malaysian Chinese Association (MCA) and Cheong Yoke Choy, philanthropist and Chinese community leader.

The party was open to all races of Malaya initially, before being limited after. The party received support mainly from ethnic Indians. The IMP headquarters were in what is now the landmark Sultan Abdul Samad Building.

The IMP contested in the 1952 Kuala Lumpur Municipal Elections in alliance with the Malayan Indian Congress under Dato' Onn and other non-communal organisations. However the 1952 elections proved the MIC's attempt to preach and practise non-communalism would not prevail in Malayan politics when communalism was the winning factor.

The IMP won its only seat in the 1952 municipal elections via Devaki Krishnan. Thus she became the first woman in the country to be elected to public office. In her 1952 election manifesto, she stated, "I will interest myself particularly in the lot of the women of Kuala Lumpur and in extending the programme of social work already carried out by the municipality."

After noticing that support for the party was unfavorable, Onn dissolved the party in 1954 and formed the Parti Negara.

== List of party leaders ==
President

| # | Name | Took office | Left office | Remarks |
|---|---|---|---|---|
| 1 | Onn Jaafar | 16 September 1951 | 16 March 1954 | |

== See also ==
- Politics of Malaysia
- List of political parties in Malaysia
- Parti Negara
