= Federal Legislative Council =

Legislative body of the Federation of Malaya

Federal Legislative Council of the Federation of Malaya Majlis Perundangan Persekutuan Tanah Melayu

Type
- Type: Unicameral

History
- Founded: 24 February 1948; 78 years ago
- Disbanded: 27 June 1959; 67 years ago
- Succeeded by: Parliament of the Federation of Malaya

Constitution
- Federation of Malaya Agreement 1948 (1948–1957); Federal Constitution of the Federation of Malaya (1957–1959)

The Federal Legislative Council (also known simply as the Legislative Council) was the legislative body of the Federation of Malaya and the predecessor of the Malaysian Parliament. It was formed in 1948 after the abolition of the Malayan Union and the formation of the federation, as part of the United Kingdom's promise to grant self-rule to the Malayans. The council convened in Kuala Lumpur.

The council was composed of representatives from the Malay, the Chinese and the Indian communities. Initially, all representatives were appointed by the British High Commissioner for Malaya. In 1948, the Federal Legislative Council consisted of 75 members (three ex-officio, 11 from the Malay states and the Straits Settlements, 11 British officials and 50 unofficial members). This was the first time the Legislative Council had two thirds unofficial majority. The Legislative Council first sat on 24 February 1948, roughly three weeks after the Federation of Malaya was formed.

The British High Commissioner ceased to preside over the Council in 1953. In his place a Speaker was appointed. The first Speaker of the Federal Legislative Council was Dato' Sir Mahmud bin Mat.

In 1955, a general election was held for the first time. 52 seats were contested, with the majority party earning the right to appoint seven more. In the election, the Alliance Party contested all 52 seats and won 51, while the Pan-Malayan Islamic Party won the remaining seat. Following the elections, Raja Uda Raja Muhammad was elected as the Speaker of the Council, similar to the present Speaker of the Dewan Rakyat.

Members of the Federal Legislative Council in 1955 were increased to 98 members, 52 elected members replaced 50 unofficial members, 35 nominated members represented various interests, the remaining 11 was made up of the Chief Ministers of the nine Malay states and one representative each from Penang and Malacca.

The Federal Legislative Council passed the Malayan Constitution (later, the Malaysian Constitution) on 15 August 1957. Malaya gained independence on 31 August 1957. The Federal Legislative Council continued to sit as the legislative body of the new country until it was dissolved on 27 June 1959 to pave way for the 1959 election, in which a new Parliament was elected.

== See also ==
- Parliament of Malaysia
- Members of the Federal Legislative Council (1955–59)
