= 1955 Malayan general election =

- 27 July 1955

52 of the 98 seats in the Federal Legislative Council 27 seats needed for a majority
- Registered: 1,240,058
- Turnout: 82.84%
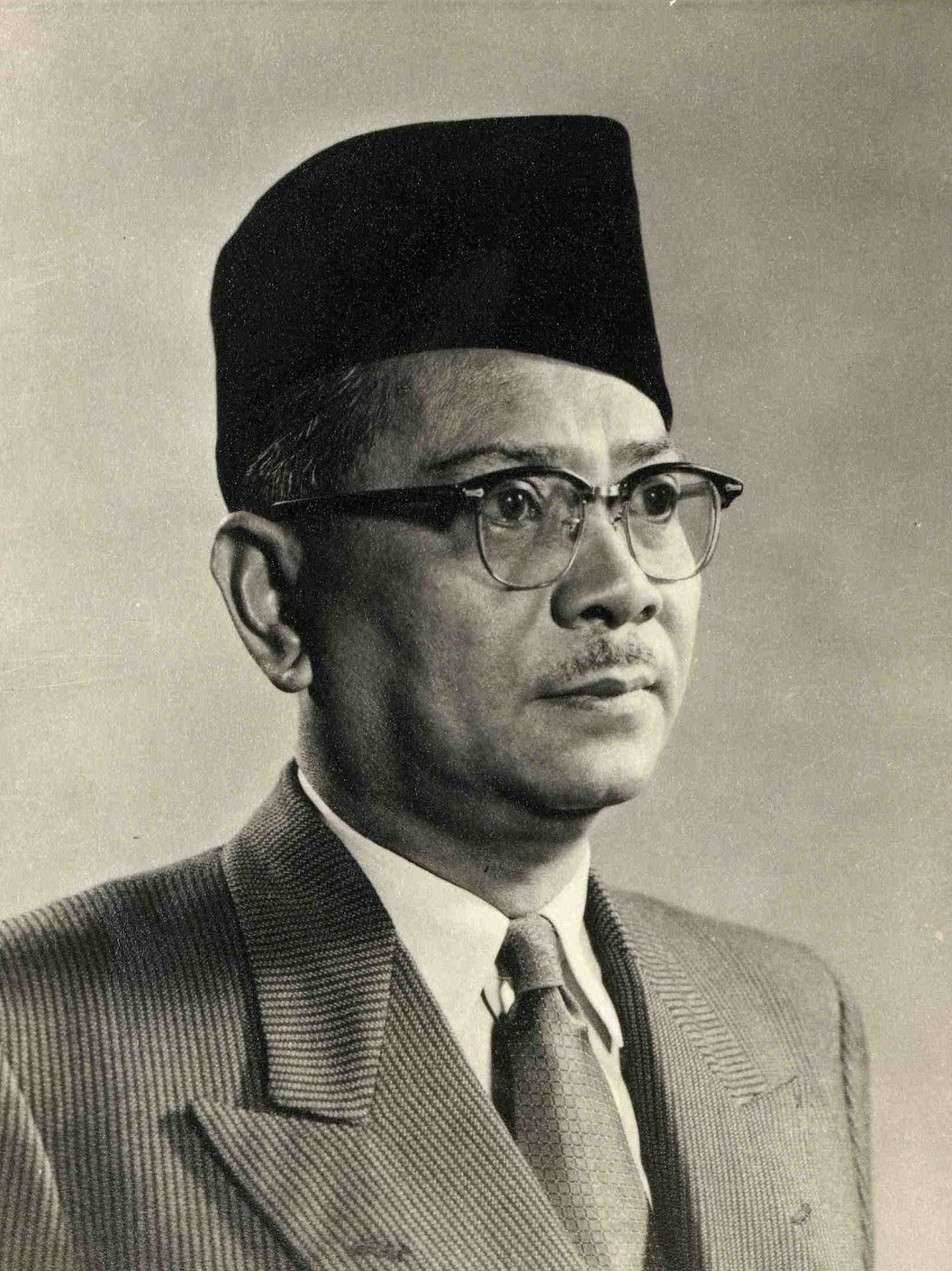

	First party	Second party
Leader	Tunku Abdul Rahman	Abbas Alias
Party	UMNO	PMIP
Alliance	Alliance
Seats won	51	1
Popular vote	818,013	40,667
Percentage	81.68%	4.06%
- Results by constituency
Elected Chief Minister
Tunku Abdul Rahman
Alliance

General elections were held in the Federation of Malaya on Wednesday, 27 July 1955, the only general election before independence in 1957. They were held to elect members of the Federal Legislative Council, whose members had previously been fully appointed by the British High Commissioner. Voting took place in all 52 federal constituencies, each electing one member. State elections also took place in all 136 state constituencies in nine states of Malaya and two settlements from 10 October 1954 to 12 November 1955, each electing one councillor to the State Council or Settlement Council.

The Pan-Malayan Islamic Party (PMIP) was formed primarily to contest in the 1955 elections. Previously the PMIP had been known as the "Pan-Malayan Islamic Association", as a part of the United Malays National Organisation (UMNO). PMIP won support by proclaiming its aim of making Islam the base of the Malay society in the north of Malay Peninsula, which was facing the lowest economic growth in Malaya.

The elections resulted in a decisive win for the Alliance Party, an alliance of the UMNO, the Malayan Chinese Association (MCA) and Malayan Indian Congress (MIC), and a resounding defeat for Parti Negara, led by former UMNO president Onn Jaafar. Onn himself failed to win a seat, while the Alliance proceeded to form the new government, with its leader Tunku Abdul Rahman becoming Chief Minister.

Thirty Alliance candidates had majorities of over 10,000 votes. Nine of them had majorities of over 20,000. Forty-three of their opponents lost their deposits.

== Timelines ==
=== Federal Legislative Council ===
- Nomination Date : 15 June 1955
- Election day : 27 July 1955

=== State Council ===
State	Nomination Date	State election
Johor	1 September 1954	10 October 1954
Terengganu		29 October 1954
Selangor	11 August 1955	27 September 1955
Kedah	14 August 1955	nil
Kelantan	15 August 1955	19 September 1955
Perlis	17 August 1955	24 September 1955
Pahang	25 August 1955	26 September 1955
Negeri Sembilan	8 September 1955	12 October 1955
Perak	1 October 1955	12 November 1955

=== Settlement Council ===
Settlement	Nomination Date	State election
Penang	13 January 1955	19 February 1955
Malacca	4 August 1955	nil

== Results ==
The Alliance Party won around 80% of the total vote and 51 out of 52 seats contested. PMIP won their only seat in Krian, Perak. Its sole winning candidate, Haji Ahmad Tuan Hussein, an Islamic scholar, was subsequently nicknamed "Mr. Opposition". Voter turnout was 82.8%.

Party or alliance		Votes	%	Seats
Alliance Party	United Malays National Organisation	589,933	58.90	34
Alliance Party	Malayan Chinese Association	201,212	20.09	15
Alliance Party	Malayan Indian Congress	26,868	2.68	2
Alliance Party	Total	818,013	81.68	51
Parti Negara		78,909	7.88	0
Pan-Malayan Islamic Party		40,667	4.06	1
National Association of Perak		20,996	2.10	0
Perak Malay League		5,433	0.54	0
Labour Party of Malaya		4,786	0.48	0
Perak Progressive Party		1,081	0.11	0
Independents		31,642	3.16	0
Total		1,001,527	100.00	52
Valid votes		1,001,527	97.50	
Invalid/blank votes		25,723	2.50	
Total votes		1,027,250	100.00	
Registered voters/turnout		1,240,058	82.84	
Source: The Malayan Elections, Francis G. Carnell.

Total Electorate including Uncontested Constituency (Wellesley North) was 1268248

=== Results by state ===
==== Johore ====
Party	Votes	%	Seats
Malayan Chinese Association	52,261	36.98	3
United Malays National Organisation	50,419	35.67	4
Parti Negara	19,433	13.75	0
Malayan Indian Congress	18,968	13.42	1
Independents	253	0.18	0
Total	141,334	100.00	8
Valid votes	141,334	97.99	
Invalid/blank votes	2,900	2.01	
Total votes	144,234	100.00	
Registered voters/turnout	178,114	80.98	

==== Kedah ====
Party	Votes	%	Seats
United Malays National Organisation	106,204	63.89	4
Malayan Chinese Association	48,947	29.45	2
Parti Negara	6,692	4.03	0
Pan-Malayan Islamic Party	1,563	0.94	0
Independents	2,817	1.69	0
Total	166,223	100.00	6
Valid votes	166,223	98.11	
Invalid/blank votes	3,201	1.89	
Total votes	169,424	100.00	
Registered voters/turnout	193,865	87.39	

==== Kelantan ====
Party	Votes	%	Seats
United Malays National Organisation	130,513	78.09	5
Parti Negara	20,459	12.24	0
Pan-Malayan Islamic Party	13,399	8.02	0
Independents	2,758	1.65	0
Total	167,129	100.00	5
Valid votes	167,129	96.83	
Invalid/blank votes	5,466	3.17	
Total votes	172,595	100.00	
Registered voters/turnout	205,901	83.82	

==== Malacca ====
Party	Votes	%	Seats
United Malays National Organisation	26,790	53.68	1
Malayan Chinese Association	17,104	34.27	1
Parti Negara	2,821	5.65	0
Independents	3,194	6.40	0
Total	49,909	100.00	2
Valid votes	49,909	98.08	
Invalid/blank votes	976	1.92	
Total votes	50,885	100.00	
Registered voters/turnout	64,708	78.64	

==== Negri Sembilan ====
Party	Votes	%	Seats
United Malays National Organisation	33,254	66.34	2
Malayan Chinese Association	8,402	16.76	1
Parti Negara	7,968	15.89	0
Independents	506	1.01	0
Total	50,130	100.00	3
Valid votes	50,130	98.23	
Invalid/blank votes	903	1.77	
Total votes	51,033	100.00	
Registered voters/turnout	58,318	87.51	

==== Pahang ====
Party	Votes	%	Seats
United Malays National Organisation	46,932	89.95	3
Pan-Malayan Islamic Party	1,999	3.83	0
Independents	3,244	6.22	0
Total	52,175	100.00	3
Valid votes	52,175	97.80	
Invalid/blank votes	1,171	2.20	
Total votes	53,346	100.00	
Registered voters/turnout	65,240	81.77	

==== Penang ====
Party	Votes	%	Seats
Malayan Chinese Association	22,950	48.48	1
United Malays National Organisation	14,865	31.40	4
Pan-Malayan Islamic Party	3,523	7.44	0
Labour Party of Malaya	2,650	5.60	0
Independents	3,354	7.08	0
Total	47,342	100.00	5
Valid votes	47,342	98.44	
Invalid/blank votes	749	1.56	
Total votes	48,091	100.00	
Registered voters/turnout	71,536	67.23	

Total Electorate for Penang is 99726. However, the registered voter count above refers to the four constituencies that were contested and excludes Wellesley North (Uncontested constituency)

==== Perak ====
Party	Votes	%	Seats
United Malays National Organisation	72,694	44.58	5
Malayan Chinese Association	34,439	21.12	3
National Association of Perak	20,996	12.88	0
Pan-Malayan Islamic Party	13,694	8.40	1
Malayan Indian Congress	7,900	4.85	1
Perak Malay League	5,433	3.33	0
Labour Party of Malaya	1,118	0.69	0
Perak Progressive Party	1,081	0.66	0
Independents	5,699	3.50	0
Total	163,054	100.00	10
Valid votes	163,054	96.84	
Invalid/blank votes	5,322	3.16	
Total votes	168,376	100.00	
Registered voters/turnout	206,466	81.55	

==== Perlis ====
Party	Votes	%	Seats
United Malays National Organisation	17,769	66.84	1
Independents	8,814	33.16	0
Total	26,583	100.00	1
Valid votes	26,583	97.83	
Invalid/blank votes	590	2.17	
Total votes	27,173	100.00	
Registered voters/turnout	30,936	87.84	

==== Selangor ====
Party	Votes	%	Seats
United Malays National Organisation	33,069	46.92	4
Malayan Chinese Association	17,109	24.27	3
Parti Negara	11,796	16.74	0
Pan-Malayan Islamic Party	6,489	9.21	0
Labour Party of Malaya	1,018	1.44	0
Independents	1,003	1.42	0
Total	70,484	100.00	7
Valid votes	70,484	98.01	
Invalid/blank votes	1,429	1.99	
Total votes	71,913	100.00	
Registered voters/turnout	85,579	84.03	

==== Terengganu ====
Party	Votes	%	Seats
United Malays National Organisation	57,424	84.87	3
Parti Negara	10,240	15.13	0
Total	67,664	100.00	3
Valid votes	67,664	95.73	
Invalid/blank votes	3,016	4.27	
Total votes	70,680	100.00	
Registered voters/turnout	92,948	76.04	
