= Minister of Communications (Malaysia) =

- Kementerian Komunikasi

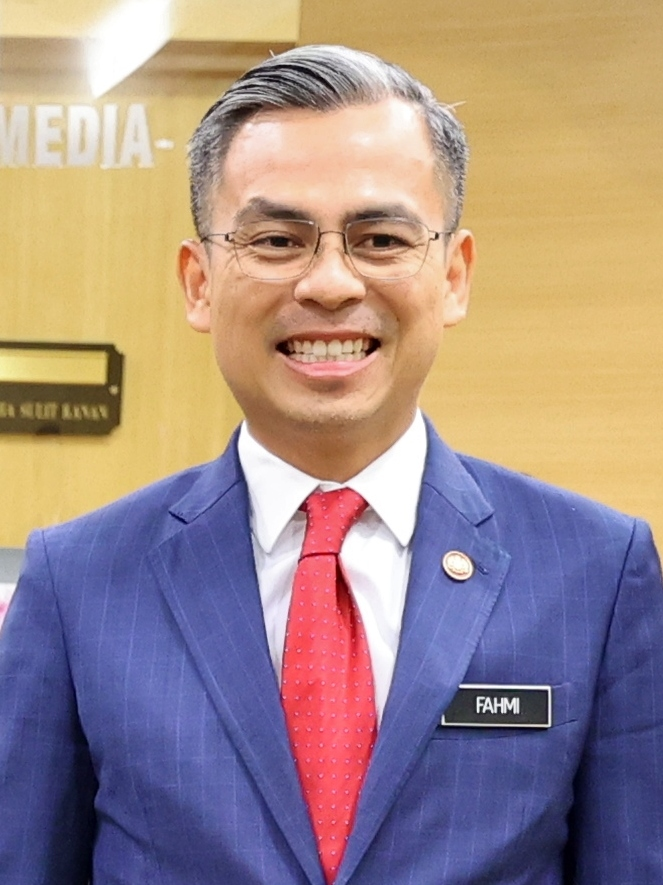
- Incumbent; Fahmi Fadzil since 3 December 2022
- Ministry of Communications
- Style: Yang Berhormat Menteri (The Honourable Minister)
- Abbreviation: KOMUNIKASI
- Member of: Cabinet of Malaysia
- Reports to: Parliament of Malaysia
- Seat: Putrajaya
- Appointer: Yang di-Pertuan Agong on the recommendation of the Prime Minister of Malaysia
- Formation: 1955
- First holder: Ong Yoke Lin (Minister of Communications, Telecommunications and Posts)
- Deputy: Teo Nie Ching
- Website: www.kkd.gov.my

The Minister of Communications has been Fahmi Fadzil since 12 December 2023. The minister was supported by Deputy Minister of Communications, which is Teo Nie Ching, since 12 December 2023. The minister administers the portfolio through the Ministry of Communications.

In the December 2023 Cabinet reshuffle, the Digital portfolio was split from this ministry, with a separate Minister of Digital appointed.

== List of ministers ==
=== Communications ===
The following individuals have been appointed as Minister of Communications, or any of its precedent titles:

Political party: Alliance/BN PH PN

Portrait	Name (Birth–Death) Constituency	Political party	Title	Took office	Left office	Deputy Minister	Prime Minister (Cabinet)
	Ong Yoke Lin (1917–2010); MP for Kuala Lumpur Barat	Alliance (MCA)	Minister of Communications, Telecommunications and Posts	1955	1957	Vacant	Chief Minister of the Federation of Malaya; Tunku Abdul Rahman
	Sardon Jubir (1917–1985); MP for Pontian Utara	Alliance (UMNO)	Minister of Communications	5 January 1972	9 April 1974	Wong Seng Chow	Abdul Razak Hussein (I)
	V. Manickavasagam (1926–1979); MP for Pelabuhan Kelang	BN (MIC)	Minister of Communications	1974	1978	Wan Abdul Kadir Ismail (1974–1976); Mohd Ali M. Shariff (1976–1978)	Abdul Razak Hussein (II); Hussein Onn (I)
	Leo Moggie Irok (b. 1941); MP for Kanowit	BN (PBDS)	Minister of Energy, Communications and Multimedia	4 May 1995	14 December 1999	Chan Kong Choy	Mahathir Mohamad (V)
	Leo Moggie Irok (b. 1941); MP for Kanowit	BN (PBDS)	Minister of Energy, Water and Communications	15 December 1999	26 March 2004	Tan Chai Ho	Mahathir Mohamad (VI); Abdullah Ahmad Badawi (I)
	Lim Keng Yaik (1939–2012); MP for Beruas	BN (Gerakan)	Minister of Energy, Water and Communications	27 March 2004	18 March 2008	Shaziman Abu Mansor	Abdullah Ahmad Badawi (II)
	Shaziman Abu Mansor (b. 1964); MP for Tampin	BN (UMNO)	Minister of Energy, Water and Communications	19 March 2008	9 April 2009	Joseph Salang Gandum	Abdullah Ahmad Badawi (III)
	Rais Yatim (b. 1942); MP for Jelebu	BN (UMNO)	Minister of Information, Communications, Arts and Culture	2009	2013	Heng Sai Kie (2009–2010); Joseph Salang Gandum (2009–2013); Maglin Dennis d'Cruz (2010–2013)	Najib Razak (I)
	Rais Yatim (b. 1942); MP for Jelebu	BN (UMNO)	Minister of Information, Communications and Culture	2009	2013	Heng Sai Kie (2009–2010); Joseph Salang Gandum (2009–2013); Maglin Dennis d'Cruz (2010–2013)	Najib Razak (I)
	Ahmad Shabery Cheek (b. 1958); MP for Kemaman	BN (UMNO)	Minister of Communications and Multimedia	2013	2015	Jailani Johari	Najib Razak (II)
	Salleh Said Keruak (b. 1958); Senator	BN (UMNO)	Minister of Communications and Multimedia	29 July 2015	9 May 2018	Jailani Johari	Najib Razak (II)
	Gobind Singh Deo (b. 1973); MP for Puchong	PH (DAP)	Minister of Communications and Multimedia	21 May 2018	24 February 2020	Eddin Syazlee Shith	Mahathir Mohamad (VII)
	Saifuddin Abdullah (b. 1961); MP for Indera Mahkota	PN (BERSATU)	Minister of Communications and Multimedia	10 March 2020	16 August 2021	Zahidi Zainul Abidin	Muhyiddin Yassin (I)
	Annuar Musa (b. 1956); MP for Ketereh	BN (UMNO)	Minister of Communications and Multimedia	30 August 2021	24 November 2022	Zahidi Zainul Abidin	Ismail Sabri Yaakob (I)
	Fahmi Fadzil (b. 1981); MP for Lembah Pantai	PH (PKR)	Minister of Communications and Digital	3 December 2022	12 December 2023	Teo Nie Ching	Anwar Ibrahim (I)
	Fahmi Fadzil (b. 1981); MP for Lembah Pantai	PH (PKR)	Minister of Communications	12 December 2023	Incumbent	Teo Nie Ching	Anwar Ibrahim (I)

=== Multimedia ===
The following individuals have been appointed as Minister of Multimedia, or any of its precedent titles:

Political party: BN PH PN

Portrait	Name (Birth–Death) Constituency	Political party	Title	Took office	Left office	Deputy Minister	Prime Minister (Cabinet)
	Leo Moggie Irok (b. 1941); MP for Kanowit	BN (PBDS)	Minister of Energy, Communications and Multimedia	4 May 1995	14 December 1999	Tan Chai Ho	Mahathir Mohamad (V)
	Ahmad Shabery Cheek (b. 1958); MP for Kemaman	BN (UMNO)	Minister of Communications and Multimedia	2013	2015	Jailani Johari	Najib Razak (II)
	Salleh Said Keruak (b. 1958); Senator	BN (UMNO)	Minister of Communications and Multimedia	29 July 2015	9 May 2018	Jailani Johari	Najib Razak (II)
	Gobind Singh Deo (b. 1973); MP for Puchong	PH (DAP)	Minister of Communications and Multimedia	21 May 2018	24 February 2020	Eddin Syazlee Shith	Mahathir Mohamad (VII)
	Saifuddin Abdullah (b. 1961); MP for Indera Mahkota	PN (BERSATU)	Minister of Communications and Multimedia	10 March 2020	16 August 2021	Zahidi Zainul Abidin	Muhyiddin Yassin (I)
	Annuar Musa (b. 1956); MP for Ketereh	BN (UMNO)	Minister of Communications and Multimedia	30 August 2021	24 November 2022	Zahidi Zainul Abidin	Ismail Sabri Yaakob (I)

=== Telecommunications ===
The following individuals have been appointed as Minister of Telecommunications, or any of its precedent titles:

Political party: Alliance/BN

Portrait	Name (Birth–Death) Constituency	Political party	Title	Took office	Left office	Deputy Minister	Prime Minister (Cabinet)
	Ong Yoke Lin (1917–2010); MP for Kuala Lumpur Barat	Alliance (MCA)	Minister of Communications, Telecommunications and Posts	1955	1957	Vacant	Chief Minister of the Federation of Malaya; Tunku Abdul Rahman
	Sardon Jubir (1917–1985); MP for Segamat	Alliance (UMNO)	Minister of Works, Posts and Telecommunications	1957	1959	Vacant	Tunku Abdul Rahman
	V. T. Sambanthan (1919–1979); MP for Sungei Siput	Alliance (MIC)	Minister of Works, Posts and Telecommunications	2 April 1956	31 December 1971	Vacant	Tunku Abdul Rahman (I • II • III • IV); Abdul Razak Hussein (I)
	Leo Moggie Irok (b. 1941); MP for Kanowit	BN (SNAP) (PBDS)	Minister of Energy, Telecommunications and Posts	1978	15 June 1989	Najib Razak (1978–1979); Nik Hussein Abdul Rahman (1979–1981); Clarence E. Mansul (1981–1983); Suhaimi Kamaruddin (1983–1984); Abdul Rahim Abu Bakar (1984–1986); Zainal Abidin Zin (1986–1987); Abdul Ghani Othman (1987–1989)	Hussein Onn (II); Mahathir Mohamad (I · II · III)
	Samy Vellu (1937–2022); MP for Sungai Siput	BN (MIC)	Minister of Energy, Telecommunications and Posts	15 June 1989	3 May 1995	Abdul Ghani Othman (1989–1990); Tajol Rosli Mohd Ghazali (1990–1995)	Mahathir Mohamad (III · IV)

=== Posts ===
The following individuals have been appointed as Minister of Posts, or any of its precedent titles:

Political party: Alliance/BN

Portrait	Name (Birth–Death) Constituency	Political party	Title	Took office	Left office	Deputy Minister	Prime Minister (Cabinet)
	Ong Yoke Lin (1917–2010); MP for Kuala Lumpur Barat	Alliance (MCA)	Minister of Communications, Telecommunications and Posts	1955	1957	Vacant	Chief Minister of the Federation of Malaya; Tunku Abdul Rahman
	Sardon Jubir (1917–1985); MP for Segamat	Alliance (UMNO)	Minister of Works, Posts and Telecommunications	1957	1959	Vacant	Tunku Abdul Rahman
	V. T. Sambanthan (1919–1979); MP for Sungei Siput	Alliance (MIC)	Minister of Works, Posts and Telecommunications	2 April 1956	31 December 1971	Vacant	Tunku Abdul Rahman (I • II • III • IV); Abdul Razak Hussein (I)
	Leo Moggie Irok (b. 1941); MP for Kanowit	BN (SNAP) (PBDS)	Minister of Energy, Telecommunications and Posts	1978	15 June 1989	Najib Razak (1978–1979); Nik Hussein Abdul Rahman (1979–1981); Clarence E. Mansul (1981–1983); Suhaimi Kamaruddin (1983–1984); Abdul Rahim Abu Bakar (1984–1986); Zainal Abidin Zin (1986–1987); Abdul Ghani Othman (1987–1989)	Hussein Onn (II); Mahathir Mohamad (I · II · III)
	Samy Vellu (1937–2022); MP for Sungai Siput	BN (MIC)	Minister of Energy, Telecommunications and Posts	15 June 1989	3 May 1995	Abdul Ghani Othman (1989–1990); Tajol Rosli Mohd Ghazali (1990–1995)	Mahathir Mohamad (III · IV)

=== Information ===
The following individuals have been appointed as Minister of Information, or any of its precedent titles:

Political party: Alliance/BN

Portrait	Name (Birth–Death) Constituency	Political party	Title	Took office	Left office	Deputy Minister	Prime Minister (Cabinet)
	Tunku Abdul Rahman (1903–1990); MP for Kuala Kedah	Alliance (UMNO)	Minister of Information and Broadcasting	1961	1966	Vacant	Tunku Abdul Rahman (II • III)
	Senu Abdul Rahman (1919–1995); MP for Kubang Pasu Barat	Alliance (UMNO)	Minister of Information and Broadcasting	1966	1969	Vacant	Tunku Abdul Rahman (III)
	Hamzah Abu Samah (1924–2012); MP for Raub	Alliance (UMNO)	Minister of Information	1969	1971	Vacant	Tunku Abdul Rahman (IV); Abdul Razak Hussein (I)
	Ghazali Shafie (1922–2010); MP for Lipis	BN (UMNO)	Minister of Information	1971	1974	Vacant	Abdul Razak Hussein (I)
	Tengku Ahmad Rithauddeen Tengku Ismail (1932–2022); MP for Kota Bharu	BN (UMNO)	Minister of Information	1974	1975	Shariff Ahmad	Abdul Razak Hussein (II)
	Abdul Taib Mahmud (1936–2024); MP for Samarahan	BN (PBB)	Minister of Information	1975	1978	Shariff Ahmad (1975–1976); Ling Liong Sik (1976–1978); Othman Abdullah (1976–1978)	Abdul Razak Hussein (II); Hussein Onn (I)
	Mohamed Rahmat (1938–2010); MP for Pulai	BN (UMNO)	Minister of Information	1978	1982	Ling Liong Sik (1978–1981); Embong Yahya (1981–1982)	Hussein Onn (II); Mahathir Mohamad (I)
	Mohd Adib Mohamad Adam (b. 1941); MP for Alor Gajah	BN (UMNO)	Minister of Information	1982	1984	Rahmah Othman; Chan Siang Sun	Mahathir Mohamad (II)
	Rais Yatim (b. 1942); MP for Jelebu	BN (UMNO)	Minister of Information	1984	1986	Chan Siang Sun (1984–1986); Mohd Kassim Ahmed (1984–1986); Ng Cheng Kuai (1986)	Mahathir Mohamad (II)
	Tengku Ahmad Rithauddeen Tengku Ismail (1932-2022); MP for Kota Bharu	BN (UMNO)	Minister of Information	1986	1987	Railey Jeffrey	Mahathir Mohamad (III)
	Mohamed Rahmat (1938–2010); MP for Pulai	BN (UMNO)	Minister of Information	1987	1999	Railey Jeffrey (1987–1995); Suleiman Mohamed (1995–1999)	Mahathir Mohamad (III • IV • V)
	Mohd Khalil Yaakob (b. 1937); MP for Kuantan	BN (UMNO)	Minister of Information	1999	2004	Mohd Khalid Mohd Yunos (1999–2002); Zainuddin Maidin (2002–2004); Donald Lim Siang Chai (2003–2004)	Mahathir Mohamad (VI); Abdullah Ahmad Badawi (I)
	Abdul Kadir Sheikh Fadzir (b. 1939); MP for Kulim-Bandar Baharu	BN (UMNO)	Minister of Information	2004	2006	Zainuddin Maidin; Donald Lim Siang Chai	Abdullah Ahmad Badawi (II)
	Zainuddin Maidin (1939–2018); MP for Merbok	BN (UMNO)	Minister of Information	2006	2008	Ahmad Zahid Hamidi; Chia Kwang Chye	Abdullah Ahmad Badawi (II)
	Ahmad Shabery Cheek (b. 1958); MP for Kemaman	BN (UMNO)	Minister of Information	2008	2009	Tan Lian Hoe	Abdullah Ahmad Badawi (III)
	Rais Yatim (b. 1942); MP for Jelebu	BN (UMNO)	Minister of Information, Communications, Arts and Culture	2009	2013	Heng Sai Kie (2009–2010); Joseph Salang Gandum (2009–2013); Maglin Dennis d'Cruz (2010–2013)	Najib Razak (I)
	Rais Yatim (b. 1942); MP for Jelebu	BN (UMNO)	Minister of Information, Communications and Culture	2009	2013	Heng Sai Kie (2009–2010); Joseph Salang Gandum (2009–2013); Maglin Dennis d'Cruz (2010–2013)	Najib Razak (I)

=== Broadcasting ===
The following individuals have been appointed as Minister of Broadcasting, or any of its precedent titles:

Political party: Alliance

Portrait	Name (Birth–Death) Constituency	Political party	Title	Took office	Left office	Deputy Minister	Prime Minister (Cabinet)
	Tunku Abdul Rahman (1903–1990); MP for Kuala Kedah	Alliance (UMNO)	Minister of Information and Broadcasting	1961	1966	Vacant	Tunku Abdul Rahman (II • III)
	Senu Abdul Rahman (1919–1995); MP for Kubang Pasu Barat	Alliance (UMNO)	Minister of Information and Broadcasting	1966	1969	Vacant	Tunku Abdul Rahman (III)
