= Hasnol Zam Zam Ahmad =

Malaysian civil servant

Yang Berbahagia Datuk Seri Hasnol Zam Zam Ahmad SMW DSAP JMW KMN AMN
- حسن الزمزم أحمد

Secretary-General of the Ministry of Health
- Incumbent
- Assumed office 9 March 2026
- Minister: Dzulkefly Ahmad
- Preceded by: Suriani Ahmad

Secretary-General of the Ministry of Science, Technology and Innovation
- In office 10 March 2025 – 8 March 2026
- Minister: Chang Lih Kang
- Preceded by: Aminuddin Hassim
- Succeeded by: Nagulendran Kangayatkarasu

Secretary-General of the Ministry of National Unity
- In office 5 September 2024 – 9 March 2025
- Minister: Aaron Ago Dagang
- Preceded by: Azman Mohd Yusof
- Succeeded by: Ruji Ubi

Personal details
- Born: Hasnol Zam Zam bin Ahmad; 31 March 1967 (age 59) Selangor, Malaysia
- Citizenship: Malaysia
- Occupation: Civil servant

Hasnol Zam Zam bin Ahmad is a Malaysian civil servant who has served as Secretary-General of the Ministry of Health since March 2026 and previously held several high government positions.

== Education ==
Hasnol holds a Bachelor of Science in Urban Planning from the University of Utah a Master of Urban Planning from the University of Pennsylvania.

== Civil career ==
Hasnol Zam Zam joined the civil service as an Administrative and Diplomatic Officer on 1 December 1992. Hasnol served as Senior Secretary of the Management Division of Higher Education Sector in the Ministry of Education on 8 January 2014. On 17 August 2016, Hasnol served as Deputy Director General (Management) of Royal Malaysian Customs Department in the Ministry of Finance. On 21 August 2017, he served as Deputy Secretary-General (Management) of the Ministry of Health. On 17 April 2019, Hasnol served as Senior Deputy Secretary-General in the Prime Minister's Department went on succeed Mohd Zuki Ali.

On 1 February 2020, he served as Secretary-General of the Ministry of Domestic Trade and Consumer Affairs. On 1 April 2020, he was appointed as Chairman of the Companies Commission of Malaysia. On 30 March 2022, he served as Secretary of the Perlis State Government. On 4 April 2023, he served as Secretary-General of the Ministry of Works. On 5 September 2024, Hasnol served as Secretary-General of the Ministry of National Unity. On 10 March 2025, he served as Secretary-General of the Ministry of Science, Technology and Innovation.

== Honours ==
- Malaysia
  - Officer of the Order of the Defender of the Realm (KMN) (2011)
  - Member of the Order of the Defender of the Realm (AMN) (2007)
- Federal Territory (Malaysia)
  - Grand Commander of the Order of the Territorial Crown (SMW) – Datuk Seri (2020)
  - Companion of the Order of the Territorial Crown (JMW) (2008)
- Pahang
  - Knight Companion of the Order of Sultan Ahmad Shah of Pahang (DSAP) – Dato' (2016)
