= Ruji Ubi =

Malaysian politician and former civil servant

Yang Berbahagia Datuk Ruji Ubi DIMP PGDK KMN ADK BSK JP
- روجي أوبي

Secretary-General of the Ministry of National Unity
- In office 10 March 2025 – 22 June 2025
- Minister: Aaron Ago Dagang
- Preceded by: Hasnol Zam Zam Ahmad
- Succeeded by: Haslina Abdul Hamid

Secretary-General of the Ministry of Education
- In office 5 September 2024 – 9 March 2025
- Minister: Fadhlina Sidek
- Preceded by: Nik Nasarudin bin Mohd Zawawi
- Succeeded by: Aminuddin Hashim

Secretary-General of the Ministry of Home Affairs
- In office 20 February 2023 – 4 September 2024
- Minister: Saifuddin Nasution Ismail
- Preceded by: Wan Ahmad Dahlan Abdul Aziz
- Succeeded by: Awang Alik Jeman

Director-General of the Implementation Coordination Unit
- In office 12 October 2021 – 19 February 2023
- Prime Minister: Ismail Sabri Yaakob (2021–2022); Anwar Ibrahim (2022–2023)
- Preceded by: Nor Azri Zulfakar
- Succeeded by: Wan Ahmad Dahlan Abdul Aziz

Personal details
- Born: 18 June 1970 (age 56) Sabah, Malaysia
- Party: People's Justice Party (PKR) (2025–present)
- Other political affiliations: Pakatan Harapan (PH) (2025–present)
- Spouse: Kamariah Abd Rahman
- Education: Universiti Malaya
- Occupation: Civil Servant

Ruji bin Ubi is a Malaysian politician and retired civil servant who in his last post served as the Secretary-General of the Ministry of National Unity from March 2025 until June 2025 and previously held several high government positions. He is a member of the People's Justice Party (PKR), a component party of the Pakatan Harapan (PH) coalition.

== Career ==
Ruji Ubi has been in civil service since 1997. He was appointed as CEO of the Eastern Sabah Security Command (ESSCOM) on 1 September 2014. On 16 December 2015, Ruji become Director of the Sabah State Development Office in the Implementation Coordination Unit based on Prime Minister's Department. On 12 October 2021, Ruji was appointed as the Director-General of the Implementation Coordination Unit based on Prime Minister's Department, previously he served as Deputy Secretary-General (Development) of the Ministry of Defence.

On 20 February 2023, he was appointed as Secretary-General of the Ministry of Home Affairs, succeeding Wan Ahmad Dahlan Abdul Aziz, who became Director General of the Implementation Coordination Unit. On 5 September 2024, he was appointed as Secretary-General of the Ministry of Education, succeeding Nik Nasarudin Mohd Zawawi. On 10 March 2025, he served as Secretary-General of the Ministry of National Unity.

== Political career ==
Ruji Ubi joined PKR in 2025.

On 25 January 2026, he was appointed as an ex-officio member of the Central Leadership Council of PKR alongside fellow Sabahan PKR members Jamawi Ja'afar and Yamani Hafez Musa.

== Election result ==
Sabah State Legislative Assembly
Year	Constituency	Candidate	Votes	Pct	Opponent(s)	Votes	Pct	Ballots cast	Majority	Turnout
2025	N72 Merotai	Ruji Ubi (PKR)	4,839	31.81%	Sarifuddin Hata (WARISAN)	8,855	58.21%	15,373	4,016	58.87%
2025	N72 Merotai	Ruji Ubi (PKR)	4,839	31.81%	Hasan Haris (PAS)	1,288	8.47%	15,373	4,016	58.87%
2025	N72 Merotai	Ruji Ubi (PKR)	4,839	31.81%	Rhyme @ Reymie Kassim (IMPIAN)	231	1.52%	15,373	4,016	58.87%

== Honours ==
- Malaysia
  - Officer of the Order of the Defender of the Realm (KMN) (2013)
- Pahang
  - Knight Companion of the Order of the Crown of Pahang (DIMP) – Dato' (2015)
- Sabah
  - Commander of the Order of Kinabalu (PGDK) – Datuk (2018)
  - Member of the Order of Kinabalu (ADK) (2013)
  - Grand Star of the Order of Kinabalu (BSK) (2005)
  - Justice of the Peace (JP) (2021)
