= Minister of National Unity (Malaysia) =

Government ministry

- Kementerian Perpaduan Negara
- Incumbent; Aaron Ago Dagang since 3 December 2022
- Ministry of National Unity
- Style: Yang Berhormat Menteri (The Honourable Minister)
- Abbreviation: PERPADUAN
- Member of: Cabinet of Malaysia
- Reports to: Parliament of Malaysia
- Seat: Putrajaya
- Appointer: Yang di-Pertuan Agong on the recommendation of the Prime Minister of Malaysia
- Formation: 1973
- First holder: Napsiah Omar as Minister of National Unity and Community Development
- Deputy: Yuneswaran Ramaraj
- Website: www.perpaduan.gov.my

The Minister of National Unity (Malay: Kementerian Perpaduan Negara) is Aaron Ago Dagang, since 3 December 2022. The minister administers the portfolio through the Ministry of National Unity.

== List of ministers ==
=== National unity ===
The following individuals have been appointed as Minister of National Unity, or any of its precedent titles:

Political party: Alliance/BN GPS

| Portrait | Name (Birth–Death) Constituency | Political party | Title | Took office | Left office | Deputy Minister | Prime Minister (Cabinet) |
|---|---|---|---|---|---|---|---|
| | V. T. Sambanthan (1919–1979); MP for Sungei Siput | Alliance (MIC) | Minister of National Unity | 5 January 1972 | 9 April 1974 | Vacant | Abdul Razak Hussein (I) |
| | Napsiah Omar (1943–2018); MP for Kuala Pilah | BN (UMNO) | Minister of National Unity and Community Development | 27 October 1990 | 3 May 1995 | Alexander Lee Yu Lung | Mahathir Mohamad (IV) |
| | Zaleha Ismail (1936–2020); MP for Gombak | BN (UMNO) | Minister of National Unity and Community Development | 4 May 1995 | 14 December 1999 | Peter Tinggom Kamarau | Mahathir Mohamad (V) |
| | Siti Zaharah Sulaiman (1949–2024); MP for Paya Besar | BN (UMNO) | Minister of National Unity and Community Development | 15 December 1999 | 26 March 2004 | Tiki Lafe | Mahathir Mohamad (VI); Abdullah Ahmad Badawi (I) |
| | Shafie Apdal (b. 1956); MP for Semporna | BN (UMNO) | Minister of National Unity, Arts, Culture and Heritage | 19 March 2008 | 9 April 2009 | Teng Boon Soon | Abdullah Ahmad Badawi (III) |
| | Halimah Mohamed Sadique (b.1962); MP for Kota Tinggi | BN (UMNO) | Minister of National Unity | 10 March 2020 | 24 November 2022 | Ti Lian Ker (2020–2021); Wan Ahmad Fayhsal Wan Ahmad Kamal (2021–2022) | Muhyiddin Yassin (I); Ismail Sabri Yaakob (I) |
| | Aaron Ago Dagang (b. 1958); MP for Kanowit | GPS (PRS) | Minister of National Unity | 3 December 2022 | Incumbent | Vacant (2022–2023); Saraswathy Kandasami (2023–2026); Yuneswaran Ramaraj (2025–current) | Anwar Ibrahim (I) |

=== Prime Minister's Department (National Unity and Integration) ===
Political party: BN

| Portrait | Name (Birth–Death) Constituency | Political party | Title | Took office | Left office | Deputy Minister | Prime Minister (Cabinet) |
|---|---|---|---|---|---|---|---|
| | Maximus Ongkili (b. 1953); MP for Kota Marudu | BN (PBS) | National Unity and Integration Department | 27 March 2004 | 18 March 2008 | Vacant | Abdullah Badawi (II) |
| | Koh Tsu Koon (b. 1949); Senator | BN (Gerakan) | Unity and Performance Management | 10 April 2009 | 15 May 2013 | Devamany S. Krishnasamy | Najib Razak (II) |
| | Joseph Kurup (1944–2024); MP for Pensiangan | BN (PBRS) | National Unity and Integration Department | 16 May 2013 | 9 May 2018 | Vacant | Najib Razak (III) |
| | Waytha Moorthy Ponnusamy (b. 1966); Senator | HINDRAF | National Unity and Social Wellbeing Department | 17 July 2018 | 24 February 2020 | Mohamed Farid Md Rafik (2018–2019); Vacant (2019–2020) | Mahathir Mohamad (VII) |
| | Waytha Moorthy Ponnusamy (b. 1966); Senator | MAP | National Unity and Social Wellbeing Department | 17 July 2018 | 24 February 2020 | Mohamed Farid Md Rafik (2018–2019); Vacant (2019–2020) | Mahathir Mohamad (VII) |
