= Norshida Ibrahim =

Malaysian politician

Yang Berbahagia Datuk Hajah Norshida Ibrahim DPSM
- نورشيدا إبراهيم

Johor Vice Women Chief of the United Malays National Organisation
- Incumbent
- Assumed office 31 March 2023
- President: Ahmad Zahid Hamidi
- National Women Chief: Noraini Ahmad
- State Women Chief: Asiah Md Ariff
- Preceded by: Noriah Mahat

Member of the Johor State Legislative Assembly for Buloh Kasap
- In office 5 May 2013 – 9 May 2018
- Preceded by: Othman Jais (BN–UMNO)
- Succeeded by: Zahari Sarip (BN–UMNO)
- Majority: 3,370 (2013)

Personal details
- Born: 1 April 1975 (age 51) Segamat, Johor, Malaysia
- Party: United Malays National Organisation (UMNO)
- Other political affiliations: Barisan Nasional (BN)
- Occupation: Politician

Datuk Hajah Norshida binti Haji Ibrahim (born 1 April 1975) is a Malaysian politician who has served as Member of the Johor State Legislative Assembly (MLA) for Buloh Kasap from 2013 to 2018. She is a member, the Vice Women Chief of Johor and the Division Women Chief of Segamat of the United Malays National Organisation (UMNO), a component party of the BN coalition. She was previously the UMNO Women Information Chief from 2018 to 2023.

== Political career ==
Norshida Ibrahim is currently the Segamat Division UMNO Women Chief and was appointed as the Wanita UMNO Malaysia Information Chief by Noraini Ahmad, the Wanita UMNO Malaysia Chief in November 2018.

She was also appointed as the Special Duty Officer to Dr Adham Baba, Minister of Health Malaysia in March 2020.

She once held the position of the Johor UMNO Women Youth Chief Movement in 2010-2013 and was also the Division Women Youth Chief Movement of Segamat UMNO from 2004 to 2013.

== Election results ==
Johor State Legislative Assembly
| Year | Constituency | Candidate | Votes | Pct | Opponent(s) | Votes | Pct | Ballots cast | Majority | Turnout |
|---|---|---|---|---|---|---|---|---|---|---|
| 2013 | N01 Buloh Kasap | Norshida Ibrahim (UMNO) | 9,448 | 60.85% | Firdaus Masod (PAS) | 6,078 | 39.15% | 16,023 | 3,370 | 85.32% |

== Honours ==
- Malacca
  - Companion Class II of the Exalted Order of Malacca (DPSM) – Datuk (2020)
