= Senu Abdul Rahman =

Malaysian politician (1919–1995)

Yang Berbahagia Tan Sri Dato' Senu Abdul Rahman PMN DJMK PGDK
- سنو عبدالرحمن

4th Youth Chief of the United Malays National Organisation
- In office 1964–1971
- President: Tunku Abdul Rahman
- Preceded by: Sardon Jubir
- Succeeded by: Harun Idris

Ministerial roles
- 1965–1968: Minister of Information and Broadcasting
- 1968–1969: Minister of Culture, Youth and Sports

Member of the Malaysian Parliament for Kuala Kedah
- In office 1973–1982
- Preceded by: Tunku Abdul Rahman
- Succeeded by: Mohammad Abu Bakar Rautin Ibrahim
- Constituency: Kuala Kedah

Member of the Malaysian Parliament for Kubang Pasu Barat
- In office 1964–1969
- Preceded by: Azahari Ibrahim
- Succeeded by: Abu Bakar Umar
- Constituency: Kubang Pasu Barat

Personal details
- Born: 10 October 1919 Jitra, Kedah, Unfederated Malay States, British Malaya (now Malaysia)
- Died: 16 June 1995 (aged 75) Ampang, Selangor, Malaysia
- Citizenship: Malaysian
- Party: United Malays National Organisation (UMNO)
- Other political affiliations: Barisan Nasional (BN)
- Spouse: Fatimah Abdullah
- Education: University of California (BA)
- Profession: Teacher, diplomat

Senu bin Abdul Rahman (Jawi: سنو بن عبدالرحمن Malay pronunciation: [senu]; 10 October 1919 – 16 June 1995) was a Malaysian politician and former federal minister and diplomat.

== Early life, education and early career ==
Born in Jitra, Kedah, Senu was trained as a teacher at the Sultan Idris Education University in southern Perak. After graduating, he taught at Sekolah Sungai Korok Tinggi in Alor Setar from 1939 to 1941.

When Kedah state was placed under Siamese rule during the Japanese occupation, he was an officer at the Alor Setar Education Department (1942-1943). He also worked as an illustrator and producer at the Japanese Information Department. In 1943, together with Ahmad Nordin, Mohd Jamil, Mohamed Khir Johari and Wan Din, he formed the Syarikat Bekerjasama Am Saiburi (SABERKAS) with the objectives of improving social and economic welfare for Kedahan Malays and served as its secretary general (1945-1947).

== Political career ==
After the war, he was determined to further his studies abroad. He signed up as a sailor and set off on a ship to Los Angeles in 1948 without his family knowledge. He worked as a dishwasher, waiter and cook to finance his high school diploma and degree at the University of California (UCLA). He graduated in 1954 with a Bachelor of Arts in Political Science. Prior to the 1957 independence, Senu was the secretary general of UMNO and joint secretary of the Alliance party. He worked with the Indonesian embassy at the United Nations the same year he was appointed Malaysian ambassador to Indonesia and served as ambassador from 1957 to 1962.

He was elected to the Parliament of Malaysia as member of Kubang Pasu Barat in the 1964 election and became Malaysia's first Minister for Information and Broadcasting then Minister for Culture, Youth and Sports (1964-1969) before losing his seat in the 1969 election. He re-entered Parliament in 1972 as the member for the seat of Kuala Kedah Langkawi but resigned after the 1978 election.

== Personal life ==
Senu was married to Puan Sri Fatimah Abdullah and have seven children. He died in 1995, at the age of 75.

== Honours ==
=== Honours of Malaysia ===
- Malaysia
  - Recipient of the Malaysian Commemorative Medal (Gold) (PPM) (1965)
  - Commander of the Order of the Defender of the Realm (PMN) – Tan Sri (1988)
- Kelantan
  - Knight Commander of the Order of the Life of the Crown of Kelantan (DJMK) – Dato' (1986)
- Sabah
  - Commander of the Order of Kinabalu (PGDK) – Datuk (1973)
