= Allan Siden Gramong =

Malaysian politician

Yang Berhormat Allan Siden Gramong MLA

Member of the Sarawak State Legislative Assembly for Machan
- Incumbent
- Assumed office 2016
- Preceded by: Gramong Juna

Personal details
- Born: Allan Siden anak Gramong; 1986 (age 39–40) Sarawak
- Citizenship: Malaysian
- Party: PBB
- Other political affiliations: Barisan Nasional (till 2018); Gabungan Parti Sarawak (since 2018)
- Spouse: Dinamicayanti Daris
- Parent: Gramong Juna (father)
- Occupation: Politician

Allan Siden anak Gramong is a Malaysian politician from PBB. He has served as the Member of the Sarawak State Legislative Assembly for Machan since 2016.

== Election results ==
Sarawak State Legislative Assembly
Year	Constituency	Candidate	Votes	Pct.	Opponent(s)	Votes	Pct.	Ballots cast	Majority	Turnout
2016	N50 Machan	Allan Siden Gramong (PBB)	4,550	60.43%	Semawi Paong (IND)	1,598	21.22%	7,704	2,952	70.38%
2016	N50 Machan	Allan Siden Gramong (PBB)	4,550	60.43%	Chen Nguk Fa (PKR)	1,381	18.34%	7,704	2,952	70.38%
2021	N50 Machan	Allan Siden Gramong (PBB)	4,155	53.66%	Madang Dimbab (PSB)	2,066	26.68%	7,893	2,089	67.10%
2021	N50 Machan	Allan Siden Gramong (PBB)	4,155	53.66%	Joseph Nyambong (PKR)	1,267	16.36%	7,893	2,089	67.10%
2021	N50 Machan	Allan Siden Gramong (PBB)	4,155	53.66%	Mary Rita Mathias (PBK)	203	2.62%	7,893	2,089	67.10%
2021	N50 Machan	Allan Siden Gramong (PBB)	4,155	53.66%	Ngelayang Unau (ASPIRASI)	52	0.67%	7,893	2,089	67.10%
