= Zahari Sarip =

Malaysian politician

Yang Berhormat Dato' Zahari Sarip DIMP MLA
- ظهري شريف

Speaker of the Johor State Legislative Assembly
- Incumbent
- Assumed office 27 August 2026
- Monarch: Ibrahim Iskandar
- Menteri Besar: Onn Hafiz Ghazi
- Deputy: Samsolbari Jamali
- Preceded by: Mohd Puad Zarkashi
- Constituency: Buloh Kasap

Member of the Johor State Executive Council
- In office 26 March 2022 – 26 August 2026 (Agriculture, Agro-based Industry and Rural Development)
- Monarch: Ibrahim
- Menteri Besar: Onn Hafiz Ghazi
- Preceded by: Samsolbari Jamali
- Succeeded by: Md Israk Abdullah
- Constituency: Buloh Kasap

Member of the Johor State Legislative Assembly for Buloh Kasap
- Incumbent
- Assumed office 9 May 2018
- Preceded by: Norshida Ibrahim (BN–UMNO)
- Majority: 877 (2018); 5,377 (2022)

Senator Elected by the Johor State Legislative Assembly
- In office 5 June 2017 – 4 June 2020 Serving with Chia Song Cheng (2017); Lim Pay Hen (2017-2020)
- Monarchs: Muhammad V (2017–2019); Abdullah (2019–2020)
- Prime Minister: Najib Razak (2017–2018); Mahathir Mohamad (2018–2020); Muhyiddin Yassin (2020)
- Preceded by: Adam Abdul Hamid
- Succeeded by: Jefridin Atan

Faction represented in Johor State Legislative Assembly
- 2018–: Barisan Nasional

Faction represented in Dewan Negara
- 2017–2020: Barisan Nasional

Personal details
- Born: Zahari bin Sarip; 18 February 1967 (age 59) Johor, Malaysia
- Citizenship: Malaysian
- Party: United Malays National Organisation (UMNO)
- Other political affiliations: Barisan Nasional (BN)
- Occupation: Politician

Zahari bin Sarip (born 18 February 1967) is a Malaysian politician who currently served as Speaker of the Johor State Legislative Assembly since August 2026. He also was Member of the Johor State Executive Council (EXCO) in the Barisan Nasional (BN) state administration under Menteri Besar Onn Hafiz Ghazi from March 2022 until July 2026 and Member of the Johor State Legislative Assembly (MLA) for Buloh Kasap since May 2018. He also served as a Senator from June 2017 to June 2020. He is a member and the Division Chief of Segamat of the United Malays National Organisation (UMNO), a component party of the BN coalition.

== Election results ==
Johor State Legislative Assembly
Year	Constituency	Candidate	Votes	Pct	Opponent(s)	Votes	Pct	Ballots cast	Majority	Turnout
2018	N01 Buloh Kasap	Zahari Sarip (UMNO)	9,186	52.51%	Norsamsu Mohd Yusof (BERSATU)	8,309	47.49%	17,881	877	88.23%
2022	N01 Buloh Kasap	Zahari Sarip (UMNO)	8,956	56.96%	Subramani Chami (PKR)	3,579	22.76%	15,724	5,377	55.21%
2022	N01 Buloh Kasap	Zahari Sarip (UMNO)	8,956	56.96%	Norazman Md Diah (BERSATU)	2,999	19.07%	15,724	5,377	55.21%
2022	N01 Buloh Kasap	Zahari Sarip (UMNO)	8,956	56.96%	Mohd Hanafi Ahmad (PEJUANG)	190	1.21%	15,724	5,377	55.21%
2026	N01 Buloh Kasap	Zahari Sarip (UMNO)	14,054	72.04%	Noraziah Mohd Razit (PKR)	5,454	27.96%	19,508	8,600	68.24%

== Honours ==
- Pahang
  - Knight Companion of the Order of the Crown of Pahang (DIMP) – Dato' (2015)
