= Edmund Santhara =

Malaysian indian politician

Yang Berbahagia Datuk Seri Edmund Santhara SSAP SMW DIMP PGDK DPMP JP

Deputy Minister of Tourism, Arts and Culture
- In office 30 August 2021 – 24 November 2022
- Monarch: Abdullah
- Prime Minister: Ismail Sabri Yaakob
- Minister: Nancy Shukri
- Preceded by: Guan Dee Koh Hoi
- Succeeded by: Khairul Firdaus Akbar Khan
- Constituency: Segamat

Deputy Minister of Federal Territories
- In office 10 March 2020 – 16 August 2021
- Monarch: Abdullah
- Prime Minister: Muhyiddin Yassin
- Minister: Annuar Musa
- Preceded by: Shahruddin Md Salleh
- Succeeded by: Jalaluddin Alias
- Constituency: Segamat

Member of the Malaysian Parliament for Segamat
- In office 9 May 2018 – 19 November 2022
- Preceded by: Subramaniam Sathasivam (BN–MIC)
- Succeeded by: Yuneswaran Ramaraj (PH–PKR)
- Majority: 5,476 (2018)

1st Deputy President of the Parti Bangsa Malaysia
- In office 8 October 2022 – 14 February 2023 Serving with Haniza Mohamed Talha & Wong Judat
- President: Larry Sng Wei Shien
- Preceded by: Position established
- Succeeded by: Position abolished

Faction represented in Dewan Rakyat
- 2018–2020: Pakatan Harapan
- 2020: Malaysian United Indigenous Party
- 2020–2022: Perikatan Nasional
- 2022: Parti Bangsa Malaysia

Personal details
- Born: Santhara Kumar s/o Ramanaidu; 3 April 1971 (age 55) Layang-Layang, Simpang Renggam, Johor, Malaysia
- Party: People's Justice Party (PKR) (–2020; since 2026); Malaysian United Indigenous Party (BERSATU) (2020–2022); Parti Bangsa Malaysia (PBM) (2022–2026)
- Other political affiliations: Pakatan Harapan (PH) (–2020; since 2026); Perikatan Nasional (PN) (2020–2022); Barisan Nasional (BN) (aligned: 2020-2022)
- Spouse: Carline d/o Johnson D'Cruz
- Education: National University of Malaysia; University of Strathclyde; Newcastle University
- Profession: Businessman
- Edmund Santhara on Facebook; Edmund Santhara on Parliament of Malaysia

Santhara Kumar a/l Ramanaidu, also known as Edmund Santhara (Tamil: சந்தார்த்த குமார், romanized: Cantārtta kumār; born 3 April 1971) is a Malaysian politician, businessman and entrepreneur who served as Deputy Minister of Tourism, Arts and Culture in the Barisan Nasional (BN) administration under former Prime Minister Ismail Sabri Yaakob and former Minister Nancy Shukri from August 2021 to the collapse of the BN administration in November 2022, Deputy Minister of Federal Territories in the Perikatan Nasional (PN) administration under former Prime Minister Muhyiddin Yassin and former Minister Annuar Musa from March 2020 to the collapse of the PN administration in August 2021 and the Member of Parliament (MP) for Segamat from May 2018 to November 2022. He is a member of the Parti Bangsa Malaysia (PBM) and was an associate member of the Malaysian United Indigenous Party (BERSATU), a component party of the PN coalition and he created history of becoming the first non-indigenous politician to join BERSATU as an associate member. Previously was a member, National Integration Bureau chairman and Coordinator of Segamat of the People's Justice Party (PKR), a component party of the Pakatan Harapan (PH) coalition. He resigned from PKR and joined BERSATU in February 2020 Sheraton Move. He served as the 1st Deputy President of PBM from October 2022 to February 2023. In the November 2022 Malaysian general elections, he chose not to seek reelection as an MP and defend the Segamat seat that he had won in the previous election as a PKR candidate for personal reasons.

== Early life and education ==
Santhara was born on 3 April 1971 at Hospital Kluang, to his parents who hails from Sembrong Estate, Layang-Layang, Johor. He obtained his Doctorate of Business Administration (DBA) from University of Newcastle, Australia.

== Corporate career ==
Santhara joined Masterskill in October 2004 as the Director of Business Development, where he was tasked with improving the company's growth opportunities. In January 2005, he was appointed as the Chief Operating Officer, responsible for overall management. In September of the same year, Santhara was promoted to Chief Executive Officer. According to the group's website, Masterskill is the largest nursing and allied health sciences education group in Malaysia and one of the largest in the Asia Pacific region.

In 2017, Santhara announced his decision to quit as the CEO of Masterskill Education Group Bhd (MEGB) to concentrate on his political career.

== Political career ==
Santhara contested the Hulu Selangor parliamentary seat as an independent in the 2013 general election (GE13) but gained only 999 votes. He stood in the 2018 general election (GE14) in the Segamat parliamentary seat, representing PH-PKR, and was elected with 52.11% of the vote. On 6 August 2020, he submitted a lifetime membership to join Malaysian United Indigenous Party, which was accepted. However, he left the party on 22 July 2022.

== Controversies ==
Santhara had gone on a 55-day holiday trip to visit his wife and children in New Zealand raising allegations that he controversially skipped duties with approved leave amid the travel restrictions during COVID-19 pandemic at the end of 2020. He has also been questioned of practising the government double-standards for being allowed to undergo the quarantine at his luxury home while ordinary people would has to stay at hotel rooms for the 10-day period.

== Election results ==
Parliament of Malaysia
Year	Constituency	Candidate	Votes	Pct	Opponent(s)	Votes	Pct	Ballots cast	Majority	Turnout
2013	P094 Hulu Selangor	Santhara Kumar Ramanaidu (IND)	999	1.33%	Kamalanathan Panchanathan (MIC)	37,403	49.79%	75,113	3,414	87.65%
2013	P094 Hulu Selangor	Santhara Kumar Ramanaidu (IND)	999	1.33%	Khalid Jaafar (PKR)	33,989	45.25%	75,113	3,414	87.65%
2013	P094 Hulu Selangor	Santhara Kumar Ramanaidu (IND)	999	1.33%	Radzali Mokhtar (IND)	1,105	1.47%	75,113	3,414	87.65%
2018	P140 Segamat	Santhara Kumar Ramanaidu (PKR)	24,060	52.11%	Subramaniam Sathasivam (MIC)	18,584	40.25%	46,170	5,476	83.41%
2018	P140 Segamat	Santhara Kumar Ramanaidu (PKR)	24,060	52.11%	Khairul Faizi Ahmad Kamil (PAS)	2,676	5.79%	46,170	5,476	83.41%

== Awards and honours ==
=== Honours of Malaysia ===
- Federal Territory (Malaysia)
  - Grand Commander of the Order of the Territorial Crown (SMW) – Datuk Seri (2021)
- Kelantan
  - Justice of the Peace of Kelantan (JP) (2012)
- Pahang
  - Knight Grand Companion of the Order of Sultan Ahmad Shah of Pahang (SSAP) – Dato' Sri (2009)
  - Knight Companion of the Order of the Crown of Pahang (DIMP) – Dato' (2007)
- Perak
  - Knight Commander of the Order of the Perak State Crown (DPMP) – Dato' (2009)
- Sabah
  - Commander of the Order of Kinabalu (PGDK) – Datuk (2010)

=== Professional membership fellowships ===
Santhara has obtained following fellowships.

- Honorary Fellow of Association of Business Executives (ABE), U.K
- Fellow of Charted Institute of Marketing (FCIM), U.K
- Fellow of Malaysian Institute of Management (FMIM)
- Fellow of Malaysian Institute of Human Resources Management (FMIHRM)
- Associate Fellow of Harvard Business School Alumni Club of Malaysia

=== Awards and recognitions ===
- Malaysia's Ernst & Young Entrepreneur of The Year Award (2007)
- JCI Malaysia Ten Outstanding Young Malaysian (TOYM) Award – Business, Economic and Entrepreneurial Accomplishment (2009)
- Asia HRD Congress 2011 Awards - Contribution to Society (2011)
- JCI Ten Outstanding Young Persons of the World award (JCI TOYP) Award – Business, Economic and/or Entrepreneurial Accomplishment (2011)
