= Buloh Kasap (state constituency) =

Political subdivision in Malaysia

Buloh Kasap (N01)
Johor constituency

State constituency
- Legislature: Johor State Legislative Assembly
MLA
Zahari Sarip
BN
- Constituency created: 1973
- Constituency abolished: 1982
- Constituency re-created: 2003
- First contested: 1974
- Last contested: 2026

Demographics
- Population (2020): 31,956
- Electors (2026): 28,973
- Area (km²): 594

Buloh Kasap is a state constituency in Johor, Malaysia, that is represented in the Johor State Legislative Assembly.

The state constituency was first contested in 2004 and is mandated to return a single Assemblyman to the Johor State Legislative Assembly under the first-past-the-post voting system.Buloh Kasap is currently located under the Segamat federal constituency.

== Demographics ==
As of 2020, Buloh Kasap has a population of 31,956 people.

Ethnic breakdown of Buloh Kasap's electorate as of 2026
1. Malay (56.7%)
2. Chinese (31.4%)
3. Indian (10.3%)
4. Other ethnicities (1.70%)

== History ==
=== Polling districts ===
According to the gazette issued on 2 July 2026, the Buloh Kasap constituency has a total of 17 polling districts.

State constituency	Polling districts	Code	Location
Buloh Kasap (N01)	Mensudot Lema	140/01/01	SK Mensudut Lama
Buloh Kasap (N01)	Balai Badang	140/01/02	SK Balai Badang
Buloh Kasap (N01)	Palong Timor	140/01/03	SK LKTP Palong Timor
Buloh Kasap (N01)	Sepang Loi	140/01/04	SK Spang Loi
Buloh Kasap (N01)	Mensudot Pindah	140/01/05	SK Mensudut Pindah
Buloh Kasap (N01)	Awat	140/01/06	SK Kampong Awat
Buloh Kasap (N01)	Pekan Gemas Bahru	140/01/07	SJK (C) Tah Kang
Buloh Kasap (N01)	Gomali	140/01/08	SJK (T) Ladang Gomali
Buloh Kasap (N01)	Tambang	140/01/09	SK Tambang
Buloh Kasap (N01)	Paya Lang	140/01/10	Balai Raya Kampung Paya Lang dan Tabika KEMAS Kampung Paya Lang
Buloh Kasap (N01)	Ladang Sungai Muar	140/01/11	Balai Raya Taman Suria Buloh Kasap
Buloh Kasap (N01)	Kuala Paya	140/01/12	SK Kuala Paya
Buloh Kasap (N01)	Bandar Buloh Kasap Utara	140/01/13	SA Buloh Kasap
Buloh Kasap (N01)	Bandar Buloh Kasap Selatan	140/01/14	SK Buloh Kasap
Buloh Kasap (N01)	Buloh Kasap	140/01/15	SMK Buluh Kasap; SA Taman Yayasan
Buloh Kasap (N01)	Gelang Chinchin	140/01/16	SK Gelang Chinchin
Buloh Kasap (N01)	Sepinang	140/01/17	SK Sepinang

=== Representation history ===
Members of the Legislative Assembly for Buloh Kasap
Assembly	No	Years	Member	Party
Constituency created from Batu Anam
4th	N01	1974–1978	G. Pasamanickam (ஜி.பாசமாணிக்கம்)	BN (MIC)
5th	N01	1978–1982	M. K. Muthusamy (எம்.கே.முத்துசாமி)	BN (MIC)
6th	N01	1982–1986	V. Arumugam (வி.ஆறுமுகம்)	BN (MIC)
Constituency abolished, split to Sepinang and Jementah
Constituency recreated from Sepinang
11th	N01	2004–2008	Othman Jais	BN (UMNO)
12th	N01	2008–2013	Othman Jais	BN (UMNO)
13th	N01	2013–2018	Norshida Ibrahim	BN (UMNO)
14th	N01	2018–2022	Zahari Sarip	BN (UMNO)
15th	N01	2022–2026	Zahari Sarip	BN (UMNO)
16th	N01	2026–present	Zahari Sarip	BN (UMNO)

== Election results ==
Johor state election, 2026
Party	Candidate	Votes	%	∆%
BN	Zahari Sarip	14,054	72.04	▲15.08
PH	Noraziah Mohd Razit	5,454	27.96	▲27.96
Total valid votes		19,508	100.00	
Total rejected ballots		228		
Unreturned ballots		35		
Turnout		19,771	68.24	▲11.17
Registered electors		28,973		
Majority		8,600	44.08	▲9.89
BN hold		Swing		

Johor state election, 2022
Party	Candidate	Votes	%	∆%
BN	Zahari Sarip	8,956	56.96	▲4.45
PKR	Subramani Chami	3,579	22.76	▼24.73
PN	Norazman Md Diah	2,999	19.07	▲19.07
PEJUANG	Mohd Hanafi Ahmad	190	1.21	▲1.21
Total valid votes		15,724	100.00	
Total rejected ballots		464		
Unreturned ballots		67		
Turnout		16,255	57.10	▼31.13
Registered electors		28,481		
Majority		5,377	34.20	▲29.18
BN hold		Swing		

Johor state election, 2018
Party	Candidate	Votes	%	∆%
BN	Zahari Sarip	9,186	52.51	▼8.64
PKR	Norsamsu Mohd Yusof	8,309	47.49	▲47.49
Total valid votes		17,495	100.00	
Total rejected ballots		341		
Unreturned ballots		45		
Turnout		17,881	88.23	▲2.91
Registered electors		21,484		
Majority		877	5.02	▼16.68
BN hold		Swing		

Johor state election, 2013
Party	Candidate	Votes	%	∆%
BN	Norshida Ibrahim	9,448	60.85	▼9.61
PAS	Firdaus Masod	6,078	39.15	▲9.61
Total valid votes		15,526	100.00	
Total rejected ballots		497		
Unreturned ballots		0		
Turnout		16,023	85.32	▲12.21
Registered electors		18,779		
Majority		3,370	21.70	▼19.22
BN hold		Swing		
Source(s) "Federal Government Gazette – Notice of Contested Election, State Legislative Assembly for the State of Selangor [P.U. (B) 192/2013]" (PDF). Attorney General's Chambers of Malaysia. 26 April 2013. Archived from the original (PDF) on 29 December 2019. "Federal Government Gazette – Results of Contested Election and Statements of the Poll after the Official Addition of Votes, State Constituencies for the State of Selangor [P.U. (B) 233/2013]" (PDF). Attorney General's Chambers of Malaysia. 22 May 2013. Archived from the original (PDF) on 2 October 2018.

Johor state election, 2008
Party	Candidate	Votes	%	∆%
BN	Othman Jais	7,691	70.46	▼15.03
PAS	Firdaus Masod	3,225	29.54	▲15.03
Total valid votes		10,916	100.00	
Total rejected ballots		360		
Unreturned ballots		0		
Turnout		11,276	73.11	▲1.96
Registered electors		15,424		
Majority		4,466	40.92	▼30.06
BN hold		Swing		

Johor state election, 2004
Party	Candidate	Votes	%
BN	Othman Jais	9,072	85.49
PAS	Mohd Rozali Jamil Al-Hafiz	1,540	14.51
Total valid votes		10,612	100.00
Total rejected ballots		374	
Unreturned ballots		0	
Turnout		10,986	71.15
Registered electors		15,440	
Majority		7,532	70.98
BN hold		Swing	

Johor state election, 1982
Party	Candidate	Votes	%	∆%
BN	Arumugam Chettiar Verru Chettiar	9,045	69.46	▼1.47
Independent	Yeong Chew Chin	2,504	19.23	▲19.23
Independent	Goh Seng Teck	1,092	8.39	▼14.61
Independent	Lewat Ibrahim	380	2.92	▲2.92
Total valid votes		13,021	100.00	
Total rejected ballots		321		
Unreturned ballots		0		
Turnout		13,342	73.11	▲1.96
Registered electors		17,870		
Majority		6,541	50.23	▲1.97
BN hold		Swing		

Johor state election, 1978
Party	Candidate	Votes	%	∆%
BN	M K Muthusamy	7,665	70.93	▼6.07
Independent	Goh Seng Teck	2,448	23.00	▲23.00
PAS	Zakaria Taib	694	6.42	▲6.42
Total valid votes		10,807	100.00	
Total rejected ballots		674		
Unreturned ballots		0		
Turnout		11,481	73.11	▲1.96
Registered electors		15,001		
Majority		4,466	48.27	▼5.73
BN hold		Swing		

Johor state election, 1974
Party	Candidate	Votes	%
BN	G Pasamanickam	6,887	77.00
DAP	Ali Mohd Dom	2,062	23.00
Total valid votes		8,949	
Total rejected ballots		332	
Unreturned ballots		0	
Turnout		9,281	
Registered electors		12,716	
Majority		4,825	54.00
This was a new constituency created.
