= Subramaniam Sathasivam =

Malaysian politician

Yang Berbahagia Tan Sri Datuk Seri Dr Subramaniam Sathasivam PSM PJN DGSM KMN
- ச. சுப்ரமணியம்
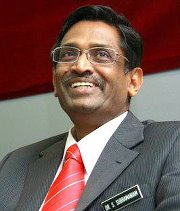

9th President of the Malaysian Indian Congress Acting : 25 June 2014 – 25 June 2015
- In office 25 June 2015 – 14 July 2018
- Deputy: Devamany Krishnasamy
- Preceded by: Palanivel Govindasamy
- Succeeded by: Vigneswaran Sanasee

Ministerial roles
- 2004–2008: Parliamentary Secretary of the Ministry of Housing and Local Government
- 2008–2013: Minister of Human Resources
- 2013–2018: Minister of Health

Faction represented in Dewan Rakyat
- 2004–2018: Barisan Nasional

Personal details
- Born: Subramaniam s/o K. V. Sathasivam; 1 April 1953 (age 73)
- Citizenship: Malaysian
- Party: MIC; MIPP
- Other political affiliations: Barisan Nasional (BN); Perikatan Nasional (PN)
- Spouse: S. Umarani
- Education: National University of Singapore (NUS); University of Wales (UK); Royal College of Physicians of Ireland
- Occupation: Politician
- Profession: Dermatologist
- Website: http://www.drssubramaniam.com/

Subramaniam s/o. K. V. Sathasivam (Tamil: சுப்ரமணியம், romanized: Cupramaṇiyam; born 1 April 1953) is a Malaysian politician who served as Minister of Health from May 2013 to May 2018, Minister of Human Resources from March 2008 to May 2013, Parliamentary Secretary in the Ministry of Housing and Local Government from 2004 to 2008 and Member of Parliament (MP) for Segamat from March 2004 to May 2018. He is a member and served as 9th President of the Malaysian Indian Congress (MIC), a component party of the ruling Barisan Nasional (BN) coalition, in an acting capacity from June 2013 to June 2015 and officially from June 2015 to July 2018. He was one of two ministers of Indian ethnicity and one of three MIC candidates to retain their federal seats in the 2008 general elections.

== Early life and education ==
Subramaniam was born on 1 April 1953 to Sathasivam, an assistant registrar of trade unions. He received his early education at the Penang Free School. He graduated with a Bachelor of Medicine and Bachelor of Surgery degree from the National University of Singapore (NUS) in 1978. Upon graduation from the NUS, Subramaniam returned to Malaysia to serve in the Ministry of Health at the District Hospital in Taiping, Perak. He moved from Taiping, Perak to Tangkak in Johor and then Malacca, where he established his private practice in 1985.

Subramaniam is a trained dermatologist. He furthered his medical practice with a focus on Dermatology, obtaining the Diploma in Dermatology (with distinction) from the University of Wales (UK) in 1994 and Membership of the Royal College of Physicians (MRCP) in Ireland in 1998. He was elected President of the Malacca Branch of the Malaysian Medical Association (1992 to 1994).

== Career ==
=== Minister of Health ===
After the 2013 election, Subramaniam became the Minister of Health. This marked his return to the Ministry where he previously served as a house officer, citing preventive health and public awareness of health issues as priorities.

==== International Medical Device Conference 2017 ====
Subramaniam officiated the International Medical Device Conference 2017.

Subramaniam served as acting president of the Malaysian Indian Congress (MIC) from 25 June 2014 to 25 June 2015 before being officially elected as the ninth president, serving until July 2018.

== Election results ==
Parliament of Malaysia
Year	Constituency	Candidate	Votes	Pct	Opponent(s)	Votes	Pct	Ballots cast	Majority	Turnout
2004	P140 Segamat	Subramaniam Sathasivam (MIC)	17,953	61.96%	Pang Hok Liong (DAP)	10,144	35.01%	28,974	7,809	70.70%
2008	P140 Segamat	Subramaniam Sathasivam (MIC)	15,921	53.61%	Pang Hok Liong (DAP)	12,930	43.54%	29,699	2,991	72.96%
2013	P140 Segamat	Subramaniam Sathasivam (MIC)	20,037	50.34%	Chua Jui Meng (PKR)	18,820	47.28%	39,807	1,217	84.68%
2018	P140 Segamat	Subramaniam Sathasivam (MIC)	18,584	41.01%	Santhara Kumar Ramanaidu (PKR)	24,060	53.09%	45,320	5,476	83.40%
2018	P140 Segamat	Subramaniam Sathasivam (MIC)	18,584	41.01%	Khairul Faizi Ahmad Kamil (PAS)	2,676	5.90%	45,320	5,476	83.40%

== Awards and recognitions ==
- Malaysia
  - Commander of the Order of Loyalty to the Crown of Malaysia (PSM) – Tan Sri (2022)
  - Commander of the Order of Meritorious Service (PJN) – Datuk (2007)
  - Officer of the Order of the Defender of the Realm (KMN) (1998)
- Malacca
  - Grand Commander of the Order of Malacca (DGSM) – Datuk Seri (2011)

Political offices
Preceded by Palanivel Govindasamy	Malaysian Indian Congress (MIC) President; 23 June 2013 – 25 June 2015 (Acting); 25 June 2015 – 14 July 2018	Succeeded by Vigneswaran Sanasee
