= Saraswathy Kandasami =

Malaysian politician and lawyer

Yang Berhormat Senator Puan Saraswathy Kandasami
- சரசுவதி கந்தசாமி

Deputy Minister of National Unity
- In office 12 December 2023 – 17 December 2025
- Monarchs: Abdullah (2023–2024); Ibrahim (2024–2025)
- Prime Minister: Anwar Ibrahim
- Minister: Aaron Ago Dagang
- Preceded by: Wan Ahmad Fayhsal Wan Ahmad Kamal
- Succeeded by: Yuneswaran Ramaraj
- Constituency: Senator

Deputy Minister of Entrepreneur and Cooperatives Development
- In office 10 December 2022 – 12 December 2023
- Monarch: Abdullah
- Prime Minister: Anwar Ibrahim
- Minister: Ewon Benedick
- Preceded by: Muslimin Yahaya
- Succeeded by: Ramanan Ramakrishnan
- Constituency: Senator

Senator Appointed by the Yang di-Pertuan Agong
- Incumbent
- Assumed office 10 December 2022
- Monarchs: Abdullah (2022–2024); Ibrahim (since 2024)
- Prime Minister: Anwar Ibrahim

Vice President of the People's Justice Party (Appointed)
- In office 20 July 2022 – 23 May 2025 Serving with: Amirudin Shari &; Chang Lih Kang &; Nik Nazmi Nik Ahmad &; Aminuddin Harun &; Awang Husaini Sahari (Appointed) &; Nurul Izzah Anwar (Appointed)
- President: Anwar Ibrahim

Personal details
- Born: Sarawathy Kandasami; 24 September 1968 (age 58) Penang, Malaysia
- Citizenship: Malaysia
- Party: People's Justice Party (PKR)
- Other political affiliations: Pakatan Harapan (PH)
- Education: University of London
- Occupation: Politician
- Profession: Lawyer

Saraswathy d/o Kandasami (born 24 September 1968) is a Malaysian politician and lawyer who has served as the Deputy Minister of National Unity in the Unity Government administration under Prime Minister Anwar Ibrahim and Minister Aaron Ago Dagang from December 2023 to December 2025 as well as Senator since December 2022. She served as the Deputy Minister of Entrepreneur and Cooperatives Development in the PH administration under Prime Minister Anwar and Minister Ewon Benedick from December 2022 to December 2023. She is a member of the People's Justice Party (PKR), a component party of the PH coalition and has served as a Vice President of PKR since July 2022.

== Political career ==
=== Vice President of the People's Justice Party (since 2022) ===
After the 2022 PKR party election on 20 July 2022, President of PKR Anwar appointed Saraswathy as the Vice President of PKR, serving alongside four elected Vice Presidents Amirudin Shari, Chang Lih Kang, Nik Nazmi Nik Ahmad and Aminuddin Harun as well as another two appointed Vice Presidents, Awang Husaini Sahari and Nurul Izzah Anwar.

=== Candidate for the Member of Parliament (2022) ===
In the 2022 general election, Saraswathy made her electoral debut after being nominated by PH to contest for the Tapah federal seat. She lost to defending MP Saravanan Murugan of Barisan Nasional (BN) by a majority of 5,064 votes.

=== Deputy Minister of Entrepreneur and Cooperatives Development (2022–2023) & Senator (since 2022) ===
On 10 December 2022, Prime Minister Anwar appointed Saraswathy as Deputy Minister of Entrepreneur Development and Cooperatives, deputising for Minister Ewon. As she was not an MP, Sarawasthy was also appointed as Senator for her to hold the deputy ministerial position.

=== Deputy Minister of National Unity (since 2023) ===
In a cabinet reshuffle on 12 December 2023, Saraswathy was retained as a Deputy Minister but was moved from the Ministry of Entrepreneur Development and Cooperative to the Ministry of National Unity, deputising for Minister Aaron. On 27 March 2024, she revealed that the proposed amendments to the 2012 Rukun Tetangga act were being fine-tuned. She added that the amendments would pay more attention to neighbourhood pillar initiative than was being implemented. In addition, she reported that there were 8,428 neighbourhood watch committees established nationwide with the membership of 210,000 individuals, encompassing 12.5 million people. Besides, she also outlined the objective of the ministry was to realise the empowerment initiatives as a force for progressive community development through eight areas of focus ranging from the economy and livelihood, security and self-reliance, leadership, community well-being, lifelong learning and the environment to cultural and digital heritage. Furthermore, she noted that several activities had been drawn up to encourage the participation of youths in neighbourhood community (KRT), like the Young, Effective and Smart (YES) programme, Jiran Muda as well as e-Entrepreneur and Young Neighbour Innovation Team initiative.

== Election results ==
Parliament of Malaysia
Year	Constituency	Candidate	Votes	Pct	Opponent(s)	Votes	Pct	Ballots cast	Majority	Turnout
2022	P072 Tapah	Saraswathy Kandasami (PKR)	13,334	29.98%	Saravanan Murugan (MIC)	18,398	41.36%	44,481	5,064	71.81%
2022	P072 Tapah	Saraswathy Kandasami (PKR)	13,334	29.98%	Muhammad Yadzan Mohamad (BERSATU)	12,115	27.24%	44,481	5,064	71.81%
2022	P072 Tapah	Saraswathy Kandasami (PKR)	13,334	29.98%	Mior Nor Haidir Suhaimi (PEJUANG)	335	0.75%	44,481	5,064	71.81%
2022	P072 Tapah	Saraswathy Kandasami (PKR)	13,334	29.98%	Mohamed Akbar Sheriff Ali Yasin (WARISAN)	200	0.45%	44,481	5,064	71.81%
2022	P072 Tapah	Saraswathy Kandasami (PKR)	13,334	29.98%	M.Kathiravan (IND)	99	0.22%	44,481	5,064	71.81%

== Honours ==
- Malaysia
  - Recipient of the 17th Yang di-Pertuan Agong Installation Medal
