= Yuneswaran Ramaraj =

Malaysian politician (born 1987)

Yang Berhormat Tuan Yuneswaran Ramaraj MP
- யுனேஸ்வரன் ராமராஜ்

Deputy Minister of National Unity
- Incumbent
- Assumed office 17 December 2025
- Monarch: Ibrahim
- Prime Minister: Anwar Ibrahim
- Minister: Aaron Ago Dagang
- Preceded by: Saraswathy Kandasami
- Constituency: Segamat

Member of the Malaysian Parliament for Segamat
- Incumbent
- Assumed office 19 November 2022
- Preceded by: Edmund Santhara Kumar Ramanaidu (PH–PKR)
- Majority: 5,669 (2022)

Personal details
- Born: Yuneswaran a/l Ramaraj; 5 November 1986 (age 39) Johor Bahru, Johor, Malaysia
- Party: People's Justice Party (PKR)
- Other political affiliations: Pakatan Harapan (PH)
- Education: UNITAR International University, Anglia Ruskin University, Twintech International University College of Technology, Universiti Sains Malaysia
- Occupation: Politician

Yuneswaran Ramaraj (born 5 November 1986) commonly referred to as R. Yuneswaran is a Malaysian politician who has served as the Deputy Minister of National Unity under Minister Aaron Ago Dagang since December 2025 and a Member of Parliament (MP) for Segamat since November 2022. He is a member of the People's Justice Party (PKR), a component party of the Pakatan Harapan (PH) coalition.

== Early years ==
He grew up in the Klang Valley and attended Sin Min Chinese School in Sungai Besar, Selangor before completing secondary school at SMK Desa Cemerlang (Ulu Tiram), Johor. He eventually obtained an MBA through the Anglia Ruskin University.

He joined PKR in 2008 and was the first person to be prosecuted under the Peaceful Assembly Act 2012 for organising the Blackout 505 rally in Johor in 2013. In 2018 he served as campaign manager for Edmund Santhara who managed to wrest the seat from Barisan Nasional for the first time.

After Santhara defected, Yuneswaran was selected by PKR and he won in the 2022 General election by a comfortable majority of 5,669 votes over MIC’s M Ramasamy, with Perikatan Nasional’s P Poobalan trailing in third.

On 3 April 2023, the election court in Muar dismissed Ramasamy’s election petition challenging Yuneswaran’s victory. However on 18 August 2023, the Federal Court today set aside the verdict and allowed Ramasamy's appeal to send back his Segamat election petition to the Election Court for a full hearing. Eventually, on 8 November 2023, Election Court judge Rohani Ismail allowed Ramasamy’s application to discontinue the petition.

Following his election Yuneswaran called for flood mitigation and transport infrastructure upgrades in northern Johor to be made a priority. He also backed electoral reforms calling for proportional representation in the Dewan Rakyat and the elections for municipal councils and the Dewan Negara.

Following the executions of Malaysian citizens K Datchinamurthy and P Pannir Selvam in Singapore, he also reminded the Malaysian government that it should itself push for full abolition of the death penalty in its own country.

On December 16, 2025, he was sworn in as National Unity deputy minister.

== Election result ==
Parliament of Malaysia
| Year | Constituency | Candidate | Votes | Pct | Opponent(s) | Votes | Pct | Ballots cast | Majority | Turnout |
|---|---|---|---|---|---|---|---|---|---|---|
| 2022 | P140 Segamat | Yuneswaran Ramaraj (PKR) | 23,437 | 46.27% | Ramasamy Muthusamy (MIC) | 17,768 | 35.08% | 50,652 | 5,669 | 73.03% |
| 2022 | P140 Segamat | Yuneswaran Ramaraj (PKR) | 23,437 | 46.27% | Poobalan Ponusamy (BERSATU) | 8,385 | 16.55% | 50,652 | 5,669 | 73.03% |
| 2022 | P140 Segamat | Yuneswaran Ramaraj (PKR) | 23,437 | 46.27% | Syed Hairoul Faizey Syed Ali (PUTRA) | 1,062 | 2.10% | 50,652 | 5,669 | 73.03% |

== Filmography ==
| Yeat | Title | Role | Ref. |
|---|---|---|---|
| 2026 | Irumbuth Thottam | Special Appearance | |

== Honours ==
=== Honours of Malaysia ===
- Malaysia
  - Recipient of the 17th Yang di-Pertuan Agong Installation Medal (2024)
