= Kubang Pasu Barat (federal constituency) =

Kedah constituency

Defunct federal constituency
- Legislature: Dewan Rakyat
- Constituency created: 1958
- Constituency abolished: 1974
- First contested: 1959
- Last contested: 1969

Kubang Pasu Barat was a federal constituency in Kedah, Malaysia, that was represented in the Dewan Rakyat from 1959 to 1974.

The federal constituency was created in the 1974 redistribution and was mandated to return a single member to the Dewan Rakyat under the first past the post voting system.

== History ==
It was abolished in 1974 when it was redistributed.

=== Representation history ===
Members of Parliament for Kubang Pasu Barat
Parliament	No	Years	Member	Party	Vote Share
Constituency created from Kedah Utara
Parliament of the Federation of Malaya
1st	P004	1959–1963	Azahari Ibrahim (ازاهاري إبراهيم)	Alliance (UMNO)	8,388; 59.84%
Parliament of Malaysia
1st	P004	1963–1964	Azahari Ibrahim (ازاهاري إبراهيم)	Alliance (UMNO)	8,388; 59.84%
2nd	P004	1964–1969	Senu Abdul Rahman (سنو عبدالرحمن)	Alliance (UMNO)	9,942; 60.23%
		1969–1971	Parliament was suspended		
3rd	P004	1971–1973	Abu Bakar Umar (ابو بكر عمر)	PMIP	10,087; 50.22%
3rd	P004	1973-–1974	Abu Bakar Umar (ابو بكر عمر)	BN (PMIP)	10,087; 50.22%
Constituency abolished, renamed to Kubang Pasu

=== State constituency ===
Parliamentary constituency	State constituency						
Parliamentary constituency	1955–1959*	1959–1974	1974–1986	1986–1995	1995–2004	2004–2018	2018–present
Kubang Pasu Barat		Jerlun-Kodiang					
Kubang Pasu Barat		Tunjang					

=== Historical boundaries ===
State Constiteuncy	Area
State Constiteuncy	1959
Jerlun-Kodiang	Ayer Hitam; Jerlun; Kampung Batu 4; Kodiang; Sanglang
Tunjang	FELDA Guar Napai; Kampung Gelong Rambai; Megat Dewa; Sungai Korok; Tunjang

== Election results ==
Malaysian general election, 1969
Party	Candidate	Votes	%	∆%
PMIP	Abu Bakar Umar	10,087	50.22	▲10.45
Alliance	Senu Abdul Rahman	9,999	49.78	▼10.45
Total valid votes		20,086	100.00	
Total rejected ballots		598		
Unreturned ballots		0		
Turnout		20,684	75.84	▼1.16
Registered electors		27,275		
Majority		88	0.44	▼20.42
PMIP gain from Alliance		Swing		?

Malaysian general election, 1964
Party	Candidate	Votes	%	∆%
Alliance	Senu Abdul Rahman	9,942	60.23	▲0.39
PMIP	Bakar Hanafiah	6,566	39.77	▼0.39
Total valid votes		16,508	100.00	
Total rejected ballots		703		
Unreturned ballots		0		
Turnout		17,211	77.00	▲3.34
Registered electors		22,351		
Majority		3,376	20.46	▲0.78
Alliance hold		Swing		

Malayan general election, 1959
Party	Candidate	Votes	%
Alliance	Azahari Ibrahim	8,388	59.84
PMIP	Abdullah Abbas	5,630	40.16
Total valid votes		14,018	100.00
Total rejected ballots		200	
Unreturned ballots		0	
Turnout		14,218	73.66
Registered electors		19,303	
Majority		2,758	19.68
This was a new constituency created.
