= Kanowit (federal constituency) =

Federal constituency of Sarawak, Malaysia

Kanowit (P210)
Sarawak constituency

Federal constituency
- Legislature: Dewan Rakyat
- MP: Aaron Ago Dagang; GPS
- Constituency created: 1968
- First contested: 1969
- Last contested: 2022

Demographics
- Population (2020): 24,700
- Electors (2022): 30,988
- Area (km²): 2,187
- Pop. density (per km²): 11.3

Kanowit is a federal constituency in Sibu Division (Kanowit District), Sarawak, Malaysia, that has been represented in the Dewan Rakyat since 1971.

The federal constituency was created in the 1968 redistribution and is mandated to return a single member to the Dewan Rakyat under the first-past-the-post voting system.

== Demographics ==
https://ge15.orientaldaily.com.my/seats/sarawak/p

Ethnic breakdown of Kanowit's electorate as of 2022
1. Sarawak bumiputera (84.6%)
2. Chinese (11.3%)
3. Malay-Muslim bumiputera (3.30%)
4. Other ethnicities (0.80%)

As of 2020, Kanowit has a population of 24,700 people.

Age breakdown of Kanowit's electorate as of 2022
1. 18-20 (6.28%)
2. 21-29 (19.4%)
3. 30-39 (20.9%)
4. 40-49 (16.4%)
5. 50-59 (16.3%)
6. 60-69 (11.8%)
7. 70-79 (5.78%)
8. 80-89 (2.11%)
9. above 90 (0.98%)
Gender breakdown of Kanowit's electorate as of 2022
1. Male (49.9%)
2. Female (50.1%)

== History ==
=== Polling districts ===
According to the gazette issued on 31 October 2022, the Kanowit constituency has a total of 13 polling districts.

State constituency	Polling Districts	Code	Location
Ngemah（N49）	Kajah	210/49/01	SK Ng. Jagau
Ngemah（N49）	Bat	210/49/02	SK Ng. Nirok; Pejabat Pertanian Ng. Ngemah; SK Ng. Ngungun
Ngemah（N49）	Sengayan	210/49/03	SK Ng. Ngemah; SK Rantau Dilang; SK Ng. Sengayan; SK Ng. Dap
Ngemah（N49）	Mapai	210/49/04	Dewan Datuk Aaron; SK Ng. Tada
Ngemah（N49）	Bawan	210/49/05	SK Ulu Bawan; SK Sg. Tuah; RH Mary Gurs @ Mary Grace Chendang
Ngemah（N49）	Pidai	210/49/06	SK Ng. Pidai; SK Ng. Jih; SJK (C) Sing Shing
Machan (N50)	Lukut	210/50/01	SJK (C) Chih Mong; SJK (C) Shing Hua
Machan (N50)	Kanowit	210/50/02	SJK (C) Yee Ting Kanowit; Tadika Taman Muhibbah
Machan (N50)	Majau	210/50/03	SMK Kanowit; SK Ulu Ranan; SK Majau; SK Batu Luking
Machan (N50)	Peranan	210/50/04	RH Ali Rantau Ensurai Poi; SK Ng. Poi
Machan (N50)	Poi	210/50/05	RH Balai Ulu Sg. Poi; SK Ng. Menalun; RH Unjan Ulu Menuan Poi; SK Ulu Poi Sebangkat
Machan (N50)	Bukong	210/50/06	SK Ng. Jagoi; RH Stephen Jok, Ng Geremai; SK Ng. Lipus; SK Rantau Kemiding
Machan (N50)	Latong	210/50/07	RH Lajang Ulu Machan Kanowit; SK Ulu Machan Ng. Manggut; SK Ng. Machan; RH Muling Anak Nyapang, Maong Kanowit; RH Jelani Ng. Laseh; RH Sawang Simpang Machan

=== Representation history ===
Members of Parliament for Kanowit
Parliament	No	Years	Member	Party	Vote Share
Constituency created
		1969-1971	Parliament was suspended		
3rd	P138	1971-1974	Joseph Unting Umang	Independent	2,2020; 38.18%
4th	P148	1974-1976	Leo Moggie Irok	SNAP	3,925; 55.15%
4th	P148	1976-1978	Leo Moggie Irok	BN (PBDS)	3,925; 55.15%
5th	P148	1978–1982	Leo Moggie Irok	BN (PBDS)	4,973; 62.07%
6th	P148	1982–1986	Leo Moggie Irok	BN (PBDS)	5,816; 74.43%
7th	P171	1986–1990	Leo Moggie Irok	BN (PBDS)	6,732; 72.98%
8th	P170	1990–1995	Leo Moggie Irok	BN (PBDS)	6,964; 60.34%
9th	P182	1995–1999	Leo Moggie Irok	BN (PBDS)	Uncontested
10th	P183	1999–2004	Leo Moggie Irok	BN (PRS)	7,782; 75.22%
11th	P209	2004-2008	Aaron Ago Dagang	BN (PRS)	6,438; 59.51%
12th	P210	2008–2013	Aaron Ago Dagang	BN (PRS)	Uncontested
13th	P210	2013–2018	Aaron Ago Dagang	BN (PRS)	8,046; 59.75%
14th	P210	2018	Aaron Ago Dagang	BN (PRS)	9,552; 64.58%
14th	P210	2018-2022	Aaron Ago Dagang	GPS (PRS)	9,552; 64.58%
15th	P210	2022–present	Aaron Ago Dagang	GPS (PRS)	7,411; 41.07%

=== State constituency ===
Parliamentary constituency	State constituency					
Parliamentary constituency	1969–1978	1978–1990	1990–1999	1999–2008	2008–2016	2016−present
Kanowit	Machan					
Kanowit	Ngemah					

=== Historical boundaries ===
State Constituency	Area					
State Constituency	1968	1977	1987	1996	2005	2015
Machan	Kanowit; Latong; Lukut; Machan; Peranan		Latong; Lukut; Machan; Nanga Melanun; Peranan			
Ngemah	Bawan; Nanga Jagau; Nanga Menalun; Pidai; Sungai Tuah		Bawan; Nanga Jagau; Ngemah; Pidai; Sungai Tuah			

=== Current state assembly members ===
No.	State Constituency	Member	Party (coalition)
N49	Ngemah	Anyi Jana	GPS (PRS)
N50	Machan	Allan Siden Gramong	GPS (PBB)

=== Local governments & postcode ===
No.	State Constituency	Local Government	Postcode
N49	Ngemah	Kanowit District Council	96700 Kanowit
N50	Machan	Kanowit District Council	96700 Kanowit

== Election results ==
Malaysian general election, 2022
Party	Candidate	Votes	%	∆%
GPS	Aaron Ago Dagang	7,411	41.07	▲41.07
PH	Mohd Fauzi Abdullah @ Joseph Nyambong	7,175	39.77	▲39.77
Independent	Michael Lias	2,289	12.69	▲12.69
Independent	George Chen Nguk Fa	741	4.11	▲4.11
Independent	Elli Luhat	427	2.37	▲2.37
Total valid votes		18,043	100.00	
Total rejected ballots		306		
Unreturned ballots		61		
Turnout		18,410	58.23	▼13.83
Registered electors		30,988		
Majority		236	1.30	▼27.85
GPS gain from BN		Swing		?
Source(s) https://lom.agc.gov.my/ilims/upload/portal/akta/outputp/1753265/PARLIMEN%20SARAWAK%20(PUB%20620).pdf

Malaysian general election, 2018
Party	Candidate	Votes	%	∆%
BN	Aaron Ago Dagang	9,552	64.58	▲4.83
PKR	Satu Anchom	5,240	35.42	▼1.74
Total valid votes		14,792	100.00	
Total rejected ballots		295		
Unreturned ballots		62		
Turnout		15,149	72.06	▲1.26
Registered electors		21,022		
Majority		4,312	29.15	▲6.56
BN hold		Swing		
Source(s) "His Majesty's Government Gazette - Notice of Contested Election, Parliament for the State of Sarawak [P.U. (B) 247/2018]" (PDF). Attorney General's Chambers of Malaysia. 3 May 2018. "Federal Government Gazette - Results of Contested Election and Statements of the Poll after the Official Addition of Votes, Parliamentary Constituencies for the State of Sarawak [P.U. (B) 321/2018]" (PDF). Attorney General's Chambers of Malaysia. 28 May 2018. Archived from the original (PDF) on 2019-12-29.

Malaysian general election, 2013
Party	Candidate	Votes	%	∆%
BN	Aaron Ago Dagang	8,046	59.75	▲59.75
PKR	Thomas Laja Besi	5,004	37.16	▲37.16
Sarawak Workers Party	Ellison Ludan	417	3.10	▲3.10
Total valid votes		13,467	100.00	
Total rejected ballots		276		
Unreturned ballots		16		
Turnout		13,759	70.80	
Registered electors		19,433		
Majority		3,042	22.59	
BN hold		Swing		
Source(s) "Federal Government Gazette - Notice of Contested Election, Parliament for the State of Sarawak [P.U. (B) 184/2013]" (PDF). Attorney General's Chambers of Malaysia. 26 April 2013. Archived from the original (PDF) on 2018-09-30. "Federal Government Gazette - Results of Contested Election and Statements of the Poll after the Official Addition of Votes, Parliamentary Constituencies for the State of Sarawak [P.U. (B) 225/2013]" (PDF). Attorney General's Chambers of Malaysia. 22 May 2013. Archived from the original (PDF) on 2018-09-30.

Malaysian general election, 2008
Party	Candidate	Votes	%	∆%
On the nomination day, Aaron Ago Dagang won uncontested.
BN	Aaron Ago Dagang			
Total valid votes			100.00	
Total rejected ballots				
Unreturned ballots				
Turnout				
Registered electors		17,613		
Majority				
BN hold		Swing		

Elector Count is from Tindak Malaysia's GitHub

Malaysian general election, 2004
Party	Candidate	Votes	%	∆%
BN	Aaron Ago Dagang	6,438	59.51	▼15.65
Independent	Frederick Bunsu Janton	4,381	40.49	▲40.49
Total valid votes		10,819	100.00	
Total rejected ballots		185		
Unreturned ballots		18		
Turnout		11,022	60.62	▲1.68
Registered electors		18,181		
Majority		2,057	19.02	▼31.42
BN hold		Swing		

Elector Count is from Tindak Malaysia's GitHub

Malaysian general election, 1999
Party	Candidate	Votes	%	∆%
BN	Leo Moggie Irok	7,782	75.22	▲75.22
PKR	Tadong Tambi	2,564	24.78	▲24.78
Total valid votes		10,346	100.00	
Total rejected ballots		274		
Unreturned ballots		90		
Turnout		10,710	58.94	
Registered electors		18,168		
Majority		5,218	50.44	
BN hold		Swing		

Malaysian general election, 1995
Party	Candidate	Votes	%	∆%
On the nomination day, Leo Moggie Irok won uncontested.
BN	Leo Moggie Irok			
Total valid votes			100.00	
Total rejected ballots				
Unreturned ballots				
Turnout				
Registered electors		18,049		
Majority				
BN hold		Swing		

Elector Count is from Tindak Malaysia's GitHub

Malaysian general election, 1990
Party	Candidate	Votes	%	∆%
BN	Leo Moggie Irok	6,964	60.34	▼12.64
Independent	Nicholas Ngalang	4,578	39.66	▲39.66
Total valid votes		11,542	100.00	
Total rejected ballots		182		
Unreturned ballots		0		
Turnout		11,724	72.58	▲5.00
Registered electors		16,154		
Majority		2,386	20.68	▼25.28
BN hold		Swing		

Malaysian general election, 1986
Party	Candidate	Votes	%	∆%
BN	Leo Moggie Irok	6,732	72.98	▼1.45
Independent	James Undau	2,492	27.02	▲27.02
Total valid votes		9,224	100.00	
Total rejected ballots		182		
Unreturned ballots		0		
Turnout		9,406	67.58	▲4.38
Registered electors		13,919		
Majority		4,240	45.96	▼2.90
BN hold		Swing		

Malaysian general election, 1982
Party	Candidate	Votes	%	∆%
BN	Leo Moggie Irok	5,816	74.43	▲12.36
DAP	Ling Ping Sing	1,998	25.57	▲25.57
Total valid votes		7,814	100.00	
Total rejected ballots		265		
Unreturned ballots		0		
Turnout		8,079	63.20	▼8.76
Registered electors		12,784		
Majority		3,818	48.86	▲24.72
BN hold		Swing		

Malaysian general election, 1978
Party	Candidate	Votes	%	∆%
BN	Leo Moggie Irok	4,973	62.07	▲17.22
Independent	Thomas Kana	3,039	37.93	▲37.93
Total valid votes		8,012	100.00	
Total rejected ballots		96		
Unreturned ballots		0		
Turnout		8,450	71.96	▲2.15
Registered electors		11,743		
Majority		1,934	24.14	▲13.84
BN gain from SNAP		Swing		?

Malaysian general election, 1974
Party	Candidate	Votes	%	∆%
SNAP	Leo Moggie Irok	3,925	55.15	▲45.26
BN	Thomas Kana	3,192	44.85	▲44.85
Total valid votes		7,117	100.00	
Total rejected ballots		440		
Unreturned ballots		0		
Turnout		7,557	69.81	▲3.34
Registered electors		10,825		
Majority		733	10.30	▲3.01
SNAP gain from Independent		Swing		?

Malaysian general by-election, 29 July 1970
Party	Candidate	Votes	%
Independent	Joseph Unting Umang	2,020	30.18
SUPP	Chua Ka Siang	1,532	22.89
PESAKA	Bujang Manja	949	14.18
Independent	Mandoh Badin @ Masam	787	11.76
SNAP	Belaja Angkin	686	10.25
Independent	Jarit Meluda	463	6.92
Independent	Lee Ghin Ching	257	3.84
Total valid votes		6,694	100.00
Total rejected ballots		102	
Unreturned ballots		0	
Turnout		6,796	66.47
Registered electors		10,224	
Majority		488	7.29
This was a new constituency created.
