= Ministry of Communications (Malaysia) =

Government ministry of Malaysia

- Kementerian Komunikasi
- Coat of arms of Malaysia

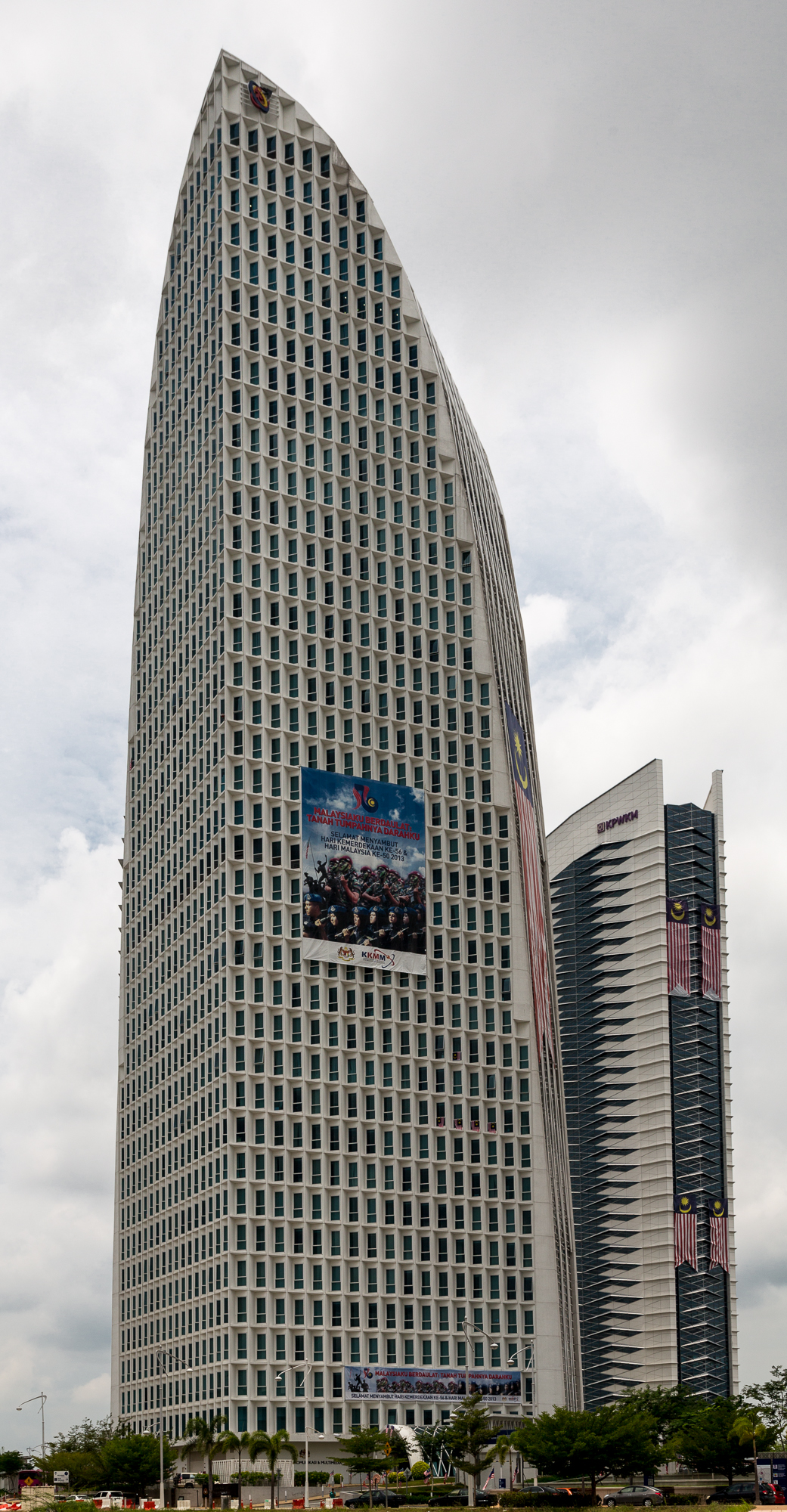
- KKD Tower (formerly Lot 4G9)

Ministry overview
- Formed: 13 December 2023; 2 years ago
- Preceding agencies: Ministry of Information, Communications and Culture; Ministry of Communications and Multimedia
- Jurisdiction: Government of Malaysia
- Headquarters: KKD Tower, Persiaran Perdana, Precinct 4, Federal Government Administrative Centre, 62100 Putrajaya
- Employees: 7,680 (2023)
- Annual budget: MYR 2,555,064,700 (2026)
- Minister responsible: Dato' Ahmad Fahmi bin Mohamed Fadzil, Minister of Communications
- Deputy Minister responsible: Teo Nie Ching, Deputy Minister of Communications
- Ministry executives: Datuk Abdul Halim Hamzah, Secretary-General; Datuk Bahria bin Mohd Tamil, Deputy Secretary-General (Strategic Communication and Creative Industry); Mano Verabathran, Deputy Secretary-General (Infrastructure of Telecommunication and Digital Economy); Mazlan bin Abd Mutalib, Senior Under-Secretary (Management)
- Website: komunikasi.gov.my

The Ministry of Communications (Malay: Kementerian Komunikasi) is a ministry of the Government of Malaysia that is responsible for digitalisation, communications, multimedia, radio broadcasting, digital terrestrial television broadcasting, other media broadcasts, information, personal data protection, special affairs, media industry, film industry, domain name, postal, courier, mobile service, fixed service, broadband, digital signature, universal service, international broadcasting, and content.

The Ministry is housed in the KKD Tower (formerly Lot 4G9) in Putrajaya.

== Organisation ==
- Minister of Communications
  - Deputy Minister of Communications
    - Secretary-General
      - Under the Authority of Secretary-General
        - Legal Advisor Office
        - Corporate Communication Unit
        - Internal Audit Unit
        - Key Performance Indicator Unit
        - Integrity Unit
      - Deputy Secretary-General (Policy)
        - Strategic Planning Division
        - Communication Technology Division
        - International Division
        - Content Development Division
      - Deputy Secretary-General (Operations)
        - Strategic Communications Division
        - Control and Compliance Division
        - Infrastructure and Application Division
        - Central Agency Committee for Application for Filming and Performance by Foreign Artiste (PUSPAL) Unit
      - Senior Under-Secretary (Management)
        - Human Resources Management Division
        - Finance Division
        - Development Division
        - Management Services Division
        - Account Division
        - Information Management Division

=== Federal departments ===
1. Department of Broadcasting Malaysia, or Jabatan Penyiaran Malaysia, branded as Radio Televisyen Malaysia (RTM).
2. Department of Information Malaysia, or Jabatan Penerangan Malaysia.
3. Department of Personal Data Protection, or Jabatan Perlindungan Data Peribadi (JPDP).
4. Tun Abdul Razak Broadcasting and Information Institute, or Institut Penyiaran Dan Penerangan Tun Abdul Razak (IPPTAR).

=== Federal agencies ===
1. Bernama (Malaysian National News Agency), or Pertubuhan Berita Nasional Malaysia (BERNAMA).
2. Malaysian Communications and Multimedia Commission (MCMC), or Suruhanjaya Komunikasi dan Multimedia Malaysia (SKMM).
3. National Film Development Corporation Malaysia, or Perbadanan Kemajuan Filem Nasional Malaysia (FINAS).
4. Malaysia Digital Economy Corporation (MDEC), or Perbadanan Ekonomi Digital Malaysia.
5. MYNIC Berhad.

=== Government company / Government-linked company ===
1. CyberSecurity Malaysia
2. MyCreative Ventures Sdn Bhd.
3. Mutiara Smart Sdn Bhd.
4. MYTV Broadcasting Sdn Bhd.

== Key legislation ==
The Ministry of Communications is responsible for administration of several key acts:

- Perbadanan Kemajuan Filem Nasional Malaysia Act 1981] [Act 244]
- Bernama Act 1967 [Act 449]
- Digital Signature Act 1997 [Act 562]
- Communications and Multimedia Act 1998 [Act 588]
- Malaysian Communications and Multimedia Commission Act 1998 [Act 589]
- Personal Data Protection Act 2010 [Act 709]
- Postal Services Act 2012 [Act 741]

== Policy Priorities of the Government of the Day ==
- National Creative Industry Policy
- National Film Policy
- Music Industry Development Masterplan
- National Book Policy

== Programmes ==
Universal Services Provision:

- 1Malaysia Internet Centre
- Community WiFi
- 1Malaysia Netbook
- Cellular Coverage Expansion - Time 3
- Telephony
- Community Broadband Library
- Mini Community Broadband Centre

== Ministers ==
Minister	Portrait	Office	Executive Experience
Ahmad Fahmi Mohamed Fadzil		Minister of Communications	MP for Lembah Pantai (May 2018 – current); Minister of Communications and Digital (December 2022 – December 2023)
Teo Nie Ching		Deputy Minister of Communications	MP for Serdang (March 2008 – May 2013); MP for Kulai (May 2013 – current); Deputy Minister of Education (July 2018 – February 2020); Deputy Minister of Communications and Digital (December 2022 – December 2023)

== See also ==
- Minister of Communications (Malaysia)
- Minister of Digital (Malaysia)
