= Machan (state constituency) =

Electoral district in Sarawak, Malaysia

Machan (N49)
Sarawak constituency

State constituency
- Legislature: Sarawak State Legislative Assembly
MLA
Vacant
- Constituency created: 1968
- First contested: 1969
- Last contested: 2026

Machan is a state constituency in Sarawak, Malaysia, that has been represented in the Sarawak State Legislative Assembly since 1969.

The state constituency was created in the 1968 redistribution and is mandated to return a single member to the Sarawak State Legislative Assembly under the first-past-the-post voting system.

== Demographics ==
Ethnic breakdown of Machan's electorate as of 2022
1. Sarawak bumiputera (78.6%)
2. Chinese (15.8%)
3. Malay-Muslim bumiputera (5.10%)
4. Other ethnicities (0.50%)

== History ==
As of 2020, Machan has a population of 14,541 people.

=== Polling districts ===
According to the gazette issued on 31 October 2022, the Machan constituency has a total of 7 polling districts.

State constituency	Polling Districts	Code	Location
Machan (N50)	Lukut	210/50/01	SJK (C) Chih Mong; SJK (C) Shing Hua
Machan (N50)	Kanowit	210/50/02	SJK (C) Yee Ting Kanowit; Tadika Taman Muhibbah
Machan (N50)	Majau	210/50/03	SMK Kanowit; SK Ulu Ranan; SK Majau; SK Batu Luking
Machan (N50)	Peranan	210/50/04	RH Ali Rantau Ensurai Poi; SK Ng. Poi
Machan (N50)	Poi	210/50/05	RH Balai Ulu Sg. Poi; SK Ng. Menalun; RH Unjan Ulu Menuan Poi; SK Ulu Poi Sebangkat
Machan (N50)	Bukong	210/50/06	SK Ng. Jagoi; RH Stephen Jok, Ng Geremai; SK Ng. Lipus; SK Rantau Kemiding
Machan (N50)	Latong	210/50/07	RH Lajang Ulu Machan Kanowit; SK Ulu Machan Ng. Manggut; SK Ng. Machan; RH Muling Anak Nyapang, Maong Kanowit; RH Jelani Ng. Laseh; RH Sawang Simpang Machan

=== Representation history ===
Members of the Legislative Assembly for Machan
Assembly	No	Years	Member	Party
Constituency created
8th	N35	1970-1974	Thomas Kana	PESAKA
9th	N35	1974-1978	Leo Moggie Irok	SNAP
9th	N35	1978-1979	Gramong Juna	BN (SNAP)
10th	N35	1979-1983	Gramong Juna	BN (SNAP)
11th	N35	1983-1987	Gramong Juna	PBDS
12th	N35	1987-1991	Gramong Juna	PBDS
13th	N36	1991-1996	Gramong Juna	BN (PBB)
14th	N38	1996-2001	Gramong Juna	BN (PBB)
15th	N38	2001-2006	Gramong Juna	BN (PBB)
16th	N44	2006-2011	Gramong Juna	BN (PBB)
17th	N44	2011-2016	Gramong Juna	BN (PBB)
18th	N50	2016-2018	Allan Siden Gramong	BN (PBB)
18th	N50	2018-2021	Allan Siden Gramong	GPS (PBB)
19th	N50	2021–2026	Allan Siden Gramong	GPS (PBB)

== Election results ==
Sarawak state election, 2026
Party	Candidate	Votes	%	∆%
GPS				▲
PH				▲
PBDS Baru	Satia Brain			▲
Total valid votes				
Total rejected ballots				
Unreturned ballots				
Turnout				
Registered electors				
Majority				

Sarawak state election, 2021
Party	Candidate	Votes	%	∆%
GPS	Allan Siden Gramong	4,155	53.66	▲53.66
PSB	Madang Dimbab	2,066	26.68	▲26.68
PKR	Joseph Nyambong	1,267	16.36	▼1.98
PBK	Mary Rita Mathias	203	2.62	▲2.62
ASPIRASI	Ngelayang Unau	52	0.67	▲0.67
Total valid votes		7,743	100.00	
Total rejected ballots		124		
Unreturned ballots		26		
Turnout		7,893	67.10	▼3.28
Registered electors		11,763		
Majority		2,089	26.98	▼12.23
GPS gain from BN		Swing		?
Source(s) https://lom.agc.gov.my/ilims/upload/portal/akta/outputp/1718688/PUB687.pdf

Sarawak state election, 2016
Party	Candidate	Votes	%	∆%
BN	Allan Siden Gramong	4,550	60.43	▲6.04
Independent	Semawi Paong	1,598	21.22	▲21.22
PKR	Chen Nguk Fa	1,381	18.34	▼12.00
Total valid votes		7,529	100.00	
Total rejected ballots		155		
Unreturned ballots		20		
Turnout		7,704	70.38	▲1.04
Registered electors		10,947		
Majority		2,952	39.21	▲15.15
BN hold		Swing		
Source(s) "Federal Government Gazette - Notice of Contested Election, State Legislative Assembly of the State of Sarawak [P.U. (B) 190/2016]" (PDF). Attorney General's Chambers of Malaysia. 25 April 2016. Archived from the original (PDF) on 2017-06-12. "Senarai Calon yang Disahkan Layak Bertanding Pilihan Raya Dewan Undangan Negeri ke-11". Election Commission of Malaysia. 25 April 2016. Archived from the original on 25 April 2016.

Sarawak state election, 2011
Party	Candidate	Votes	%	∆%
BN	Gramong Juna	3,683	54.39	▼15.34
PKR	Chen Nguk Fa	2,054	30.34	▲30.34
Love Malaysia Party	Kong Tat Kim	696	10.28	▲10.28
SNAP	Augustine Liom @ August Liom	338	4.99	▼25.28
Total valid votes		6,771	100.00	
Total rejected ballots		109		
Unreturned ballots		15		
Turnout		6,895	69.34	▲10.05
Registered electors		9,944		
Majority		1,629	24.06	▼15.39
BN hold		Swing		
Source(s) "Federal Government Gazette - Results of Contested Election and Statements of the Poll after the Official Addition of Votes Sarawak [P.U. (B) 245/2011]" (PDF). Attorney General's Chambers of Malaysia. 29 April 2011.

Sarawak state election, 2006
Party	Candidate	Votes	%	∆%
BN	Gramong Juna	4,045	69.73	▲4.97
SNAP	Rimong Jantan	1,756	30.27	▲30.27
Total valid votes		5,801	100.00	
Total rejected ballots		93		
Unreturned ballots		15		
Turnout		5,909	59.29	▼7.26
Registered electors		9,966		
Majority		2,289	39.46	▲2.22
BN hold		Swing		

Sarawak state election, 2001
Party	Candidate	Votes	%	∆%
BN	Gramong Juna	4,231	64.76	▼0.03
Independent	Alphonsus Spung Antas	1,798	27.52	▲27.52
Independent	Alau Tayan	504	7.71	▲7.71
Total valid votes		6,533	100.00	
Total rejected ballots		91		
Unreturned ballots		6		
Turnout		6,630	66.55	▼6.45
Registered electors		9,963		
Majority		2,433	37.24	▲5.95
BN hold		Swing		

Sarawak state election, 1996
Party	Candidate	Votes	%	∆%
BN	Gramong Juna	4,619	64.79	▲10.29
Independent	Angki Kaboy	2,389	33.51	▲33.51
Independent	Douglas Limbai Gurun	121	1.70	▲1.70
Total valid votes		7,129	100.00	
Total rejected ballots		116		
Unreturned ballots		5		
Turnout		7,250	73.00	▼5.38
Registered electors		9,932		
Majority		2,230	31.28	▲22.28
BN hold		Swing		

Sarawak state election, 1991
Party	Candidate	Votes	%	∆%
BN	Gramong Juna	3,700	54.50	▼3.92
PBDS	Alau Tayan	3,089	45.50	▲3.92
Total valid votes		6,789	100.00	
Total rejected ballots		49		
Unreturned ballots		9		
Turnout		6,847	78.38	▲1.70
Registered electors		8,736		
Majority		611	9.00	▼7.85
BN gain from PBDS		Swing		?

Sarawak state election, 1987
Party	Candidate	Votes	%	∆%
PBDS	Gramong Juna	3,426	58.42	▲0.77
BN	Martin Charlie	2,438	41.58	▲0.77
Total valid votes		5,864	100.00	
Total rejected ballots		57		
Unreturned ballots		0		
Turnout		5,921	77.39	
Registered electors		7,651		
Majority		988	16.85	▼0.03
PBDS hold		Swing		

Sarawak state election, 1983
Party	Candidate	Votes	%	∆%
PBDS	Gramong Juna	3,017	57.65	▲57.65
SNAP	Stephen Jinggut Ajub	2,134	40.78	▼21.71
Independent	Bartholomew Aji Lanyau	82	1.57	▲1.57
Total valid votes		5,233	100.00	
Total rejected ballots		33		
Unreturned ballots		0		
Turnout		5,266	76.73	▲7.91
Registered electors		6,863		
Majority		883	16.88	▼8.07
PBDS gain from BN		Swing		?

Sarawak state election, 1979
Party	Candidate	Votes	%	∆%
BN	Gramong Juna	2,919	62.48	▲9.16
Independent	Chua Poh Huo	1,753	37.52	▲37.52
Total valid votes		4,672	100.00	
Total rejected ballots		81		
Unreturned ballots		0		
Turnout		4,753	68.99	▼3.91
Registered electors		6,888		
Majority		1,166	24.96	▲18.28
BN hold		Swing		

Sarawak state by-election, 16 September 1978 Upon the resignation of incumbent, Leo Moggie Irok
Party	Candidate	Votes	%	∆%
BN	Gramong Juna	2,142	50.75	▼2.57
Independent	Thomas Kana	2,079	49.25	▲2.57
Total valid votes		4,221	100.00	
Total rejected ballots				
Unreturned ballots				
Turnout				
Registered electors				
Majority		63	1.49	▼5.18
BN gain from SNAP		Swing		?

Sarawak state election, 1974
Party	Candidate	Votes	%	∆%
SNAP	Leo Moggie Irok	2,110	53.34	▲45.87
BN	Thomas Kana	1,846	46.66	▼9.55
Total valid votes		3,956	100.00	
Total rejected ballots		218		
Unreturned ballots		0		
Turnout		4,174	73.20	▼7.70
Registered electors		5,702		
Majority		264	6.67	▼13.22
SNAP gain from PESAKA		Swing		?

Sarawak state election, 1969
Party	Candidate	Votes	%
PESAKA	Thomas Kana	2,459	56.21
SUPP	Kong Foh Kim	1,589	36.32
SNAP	Stephen Mapang Sanggau	327	7.47
Total valid votes		4,375	100.00
Total rejected ballots		71	
Unreturned ballots		0	
Turnout		4,446	80.90
Registered electors		5,496	
Majority		870	19.89
This was a new constituency created.
