= Ministry of National Unity (Malaysia) =

Government ministry of Malaysia

- Kementerian Perpaduan Negara
- Seal of Malaysian Government

Agency overview
- Formed: 9 February 2020
- Preceding agency: Department of National Unity and Social Well-being
- Type: Government
- Headquarters: Block F9, Lebuh Perdana Timur 4, Presint 1, 62000 Putrajaya
- Minister responsible: Datuk Aaron Ago Dagang, Minister of National Unity
- Deputy Minister responsible: Saraswathy Kandasami, Deputy Minister of National Unity
- Agency executives: Dato' Haslina binti Abdul Hamid, Chief Secretary; Mohamad Sobri bin Mat Daud, Deputy Secretary-General (Policy and Strategic Development); Datuk Mohamad Azhan bin Md Amir, Deputy Secretary-General (Management)
- Website: perpaduan.gov.my

The Ministry of National Unity (Malay: Kementerian Perpaduan Negara) is a ministry of the Government of Malaysia established on February 9, 2020.

The Ministry of National Unity is headquartered in Parcel F, Precinct 1, Putrajaya.

== Organization ==
- Minister of National Unity
  - Deputy Minister
    - Secretary-General
      - Under the Authority of Secretary-General
        - Senior Undersecretary (Management)
        - Office of the Legal Adviser
        - Internal Audit Unit
        - Corporate Communications Unit
        - Human Resources Management Division
        - Finance and Earning Division
        - Account Division
        - Information Management Division
        - Management Service Division
      - Deputy Secretary-General (Policy and Strategic Development)
        - Policy and International Relationship Division
        - National Unity Division
        - Strategic Collaboration Division

== See also ==
- Minister of National Unity
