= Leo Moggie =

Malaysian politician (born 1941)

Yang Berbahagia Tan Sri Dato' Sri Leo Moggie Irok PSM DA PNBS SSAP

Minister of Energy, Water and Communications (Minister of Energy, Telecommunications and Posts : 9 July 1978–15 June 1989) (Minister of Energy, Communications and Multimedia : 8 May 1995–14 December 1999)
- In office 8 May 1995 – 26 March 2004
- Monarchs: Ja'afar; Salahuddin; Sirajuddin
- Prime Minister: Mahathir Mohamad; Abdullah Ahmad Badawi
- Deputy: Chan Kong Choy (1995–1999); Tan Chai Ho (1999–2004)
- Preceded by: Samy Vellu as Minister of Energy, Telecommunications and Posts
- Succeeded by: Lim Keng Yaik
- Constituency: Kanowit
- In office 29 July 1978 – 15 June 1989
- Monarchs: Yahya Petra; Ahmad Shah; Iskandar; Azlan Shah
- Prime Minister: Hussein Onn; Mahathir Mohamad
- Deputy: Najib Razak (1978–1980); Nik Hussein Wan Abdul Rahman (1980–1981); Clarence E. Mansul (1981–1983); Zainal Abidin Zin (1986–1987); Abdul Ghani Othman (1987–1989)
- Preceded by: Mohamed Yaacob as Minister of Energy, Technology and Research
- Succeeded by: Samy Vellu
- Constituency: Kanowit

Minister of Works
- In office 15 June 1989 – 7 May 1995
- Monarchs: Azlan Shah; Ja'afar
- Prime Minister: Mahathir Mohamad
- Deputy: Alexander Lee Yu Lung (1989–1990); Luhat Wan (1989–1990); Kerk Choo Ting (1990–1995); Peter Tinggom Kamarau (1990–1995)
- Preceded by: Samy Vellu
- Succeeded by: Samy Vellu
- Constituency: Kanowit

Chairman of Tenaga Nasional Berhad
- In office 12 April 2004 – 11 March 2020
- Minister: Abdullah Ahmad Badawi (2004–2008); Nor Mohamed Yakcop (2004–2009); Najib Razak (2008–2018); Ahmad Husni Hanadzlah (2009–2016); Johari Abdul Ghani (2016–2018); Lim Guan Eng (2018–2020)
- CEO: Che Khalib Mohamad Nor; Amir Hamzah Azizan
- Preceded by: Awang Adek Hussin
- Succeeded by: Ahmad Badri Mohd Zahir

Member of the Malaysian Parliament for Kanowit
- In office 14 September 1974 – 21 March 2004
- Preceded by: Joseph Unting Umang (Independent)
- Succeeded by: Aaron Ago Dagang (PRS – BN)
- Majority: 733 (1974); 1,934 (1978); 3,818 (1982); 4,240 (1986); 2,386 (1990) uncontested (1995); 5,218 (1999)

Member of the Sarawak State Legislative Assembly for Machan
- In office 14 September 1974 – 16 September 1978
- Preceded by: Thomas Kana (PBB)
- Succeeded by: Gramong Juna (BN)

Personal details
- Born: Leo Moggie anak Irok; 1 October 1941 (age 85) Kanowit, Raj of Sarawak, British Empire (now Sarawak, Malaysia)
- Party: Sarawak Native People's Party (PBDS); Sarawak National Party (SNAP)
- Other political affiliations: Barisan Nasional (BN)
- Education: Pennsylvania State University; University of Otago
- Occupation: Politician

Leo Moggie anak Irok (born 1 October 1941) is a Malaysian former politician and former President of Sarawak Native People's Party (PBDS); a splinter party of the Sarawak National Party (SNAP) following the 1983 leadership crisis. He is a former chairman of Tenaga Nasional Berhad (TNB) from 2004 to 2020.

== Early life ==
He was born in 1941 in Kanowit, Sarawak. He obtained his early education at Tanjung Lobang Primary School, Miri and St Joseph School, Kuching before continuing his studies at Batu Lintang Teachers Training College, Miri.

He then obtained a master's degree in history from Otago University in 1965 and a Master in Business Administration from the University of Pennsylvania.

== Career ==
He started his career in private sector as the deputy general manager of Borneo Development Corporation from 1973 to 1974. He held various civil servant positions in Sarawak from 1966 to 1974.

== Politics ==
He began his political career as the Member of Parliament (MP) for Kanowit from 1974 to 2004. Prior to that, he was the Member of the Sarawak State Legislative Assembly for Machan from 1974 to 1978.

He served as Minister of Welfare Services in 1976 to 1977 and as Minister of Local Government from 1977 to 1978 in Sarawak Government.

He then, join the Federal Cabinet as Minister of Energy, Telecommunications and Posts from 1978 to 1989. He was also appointed as the Minister of Works from 1989 to 1995, by Prime Minister Mahathir Mohamad. Then, he was the Minister of Energy, Telecommunications and Posts again from 1995 to 1998. His last position as minister was as the Minister of Energy, Communications and Multimedia from 1998 to 2004.

== Upon retirement ==
He is a former chairman of the board for Tenaga Nasional Berhad (TNB) from 12 April 2004 to 11 March 2020, making him the longest-serving chairman of the company. He also served as the chairman of the boards for Universiti Tenaga Nasional (UNITEN) and its pro-chancellor. He also serves as a director of Kapar Energy Ventures Sdn Bhd from 2004.

He is the adjunct professor at the Faculty of Communications and Modern Languages, Universiti Utara Malaysia since March 2005.

He is also serves as senior independent non-executive director at DiGi Telecommunications Sdn Bhd and has been its independent non-executive director since 2005. At Asian Plantations Limited he was the independent non-executive director until 2014. He is the senior independent non-executive director of Digi.com Bhd until 2013. At New Straits Times Press, he served as non-executive director until 2008.

== Election results ==
Parliament of Malaysia
| Year | Constituency | Candidate | Votes | Pct | Opponent(s) | Votes | Pct | Ballots cast | Majority | Turnout |
|---|---|---|---|---|---|---|---|---|---|---|
| 1974 | P148 Kanowit | Leo Moggie Irok (SNAP) | 3,925 | 55.15% | Thomas Kana | 3,192 | 44.85% | | 733 | |
| 1978 | P148 Kanowit | Leo Moggie Irok (PBDS) | 4,973 | 62.07% | Thomas Kana (IND) | 3,039 | 37.93% | | 1,934 | |
| 1982 | P148 Kanowit | Leo Moggie Irok (PBDS) | 5,816 | 74.43% | Ling Ping Sing (DAP) | 1,998 | 25.57% | 8,079 | 3,818 | 63.20% |
| 1986 | P171 Kanowit | Leo Moggie Irok (PBDS) | 6,732 | 72.98% | James Undau (IND) | 2,492 | 27.02% | 9,406 | 4,240 | 67.58% |
| 1990 | P170 Kanowit | Leo Moggie Irok (PBDS) | 6,964 | 60.34% | Nicholas Ngalang (IND) | 4,578 | 39.66% | 11,724 | 2,386 | 72.58% |
| 1995 | P182 Kanowit | Leo Moggie Irok (PBDS) | Unopposed | | | | | | | |
| 1999 | P183 Kanowit | Leo Moggie Irok (PBDS) | 7,782 | 75.22% | Tadong Tambi (keADILan) | 2,564 | 24.78% | 10,710 | 5,218 | 58.94% |

== Honours ==
He received an honorary doctorate of laws from Otago University, New Zealand, in 2000 and honorary doctorate of science from Multimedia University, Malaysia, in 2003.

=== Honours of Malaysia ===
- Malaysia
  - Commander of the Order of Loyalty to the Crown of Malaysia (PSM) – Tan Sri (2005)
- Sarawak
  - Knight Commander of the Most Exalted Order of the Star of Sarawak (PNBS) – formerly Dato', now Dato Sri (1980)
  - Knight Commander of the Order of the Star of Hornbill Sarawak (DA) – Datuk Amar (1999)
- Pahang
  - Grand Knight of the Order of Sultan Ahmad Shah of Pahang (SSAP) – Dato' Sri (2007)

== See also ==
- Kanowit (federal constituency)
- Machan (state constituency)
