= Segamat (federal constituency) =

Federal constituency in Johor, Malaysia

Segamat (P140)
Johor constituency

Federal constituency
- Legislature: Dewan Rakyat
- MP: Yuneswaran Ramaraj; PH
- Constituency created: 1955
- Constituency abolished: 1959
- Constituency re-created: 1974
- First contested: 1955
- Last contested: 2022

Demographics
- Population (2020): 76,011
- Electors (2026): 70,110
- Area (km²): 941
- Pop. density (per km²): 80.8

Segamat is a federal constituency in Segamat District, Johor, Malaysia, that has been represented in the Dewan Rakyat since 1955 to 1959 and 1974 to present.

The federal constituency was created in the 1955 redistribution and is mandated to return a single member to the Dewan Rakyat under the first past the post voting system.

== Demographics ==
Ethnic breakdown of Segamat's electorate as of 2022
1. Malay (47.7%)
2. Chinese (42.7%)
3. Indian (9.20%)
4. Other ethnicities (0.40%)

As of 2020, Segamat has a population of 76,011 people.

Age breakdown of Segamat's electorate as of 2022
1. 18-20 (4.81%)
2. 21-29 (18.7%)
3. 30-39 (22.5%)
4. 40-49 (16.1%)
5. 50-59 (14.6%)
6. 60-69 (13.9%)
7. 70-79 (6.56%)
8. 80-89 (2.38%)
9. above 90 (0.49%)
Gender breakdown of Segamat's electorate as of 2022
1. Male (50.3%)
2. Female (49.7%)

== History ==
=== Polling districts ===
According to the gazette issued on 2 July 2026, the Segamat constituency has a total of 43 polling districts.

State constituency	Polling districts	Code	Location
Buloh Kasap (N01)	Mensudot Lema	140/01/01	SK Mensudut Lama
Buloh Kasap (N01)	Balai Badang	140/01/02	SK Balai Badang
Buloh Kasap (N01)	Palong Timor	140/01/03	SK LKTP Palong Timor
Buloh Kasap (N01)	Sepang Loi	140/01/04	SK Spang Loi
Buloh Kasap (N01)	Mensudot Pindah	140/01/05	SK Mensudut Pindah
Buloh Kasap (N01)	Awat	140/01/06	SK Kampong Awat
Buloh Kasap (N01)	Pekan Gemas Bahru	140/01/07	SJK (C) Tah Kang
Buloh Kasap (N01)	Gomali	140/01/08	SJK (T) Ladang Gomali
Buloh Kasap (N01)	Tambang	140/01/09	SK Tambang
Buloh Kasap (N01)	Paya Lang	140/01/10	Balai Raya Kampung Paya Lang dan Tabika KEMAS Kampung Paya Lang
Buloh Kasap (N01)	Ladang Sungai Muar	140/01/11	Balai Raya Taman Suria Buloh Kasap
Buloh Kasap (N01)	Kuala Paya	140/01/12	SK Kuala Paya
Buloh Kasap (N01)	Bandar Buloh Kasap Utara	140/01/13	SA Buloh Kasap
Buloh Kasap (N01)	Bandar Buloh Kasap Selatan	140/01/14	SK Buloh Kasap
Buloh Kasap (N01)	Buloh Kasap	140/01/15	SMK Buluh Kasap; SA Taman Yayasan
Buloh Kasap (N01)	Gelang Chinchin	140/01/16	SK Gelang Chinchin
Buloh Kasap (N01)	Sepinang	140/01/17	SK Sepinang
Jementah (N02)	Gemas Baru	140/02/01	SJK (T) Lasang Fortrose
Jementah (N02)	Fortrose	140/02/02	SJK (T) Ladang Fortrose
Jementah (N02)	Sungai Senarut	140/02/03	SJK (T) Ldg Sungai Senarut
Jementah (N02)	Bandar Batu Anam	140/02/04	SMK Dato' Ahmad Arshad
Jementah (N02)	Batu Anam	140/02/05	SMK Seri Kenangan
Jementah (N02)	Bandan	140/02/06	Balai Raya Kampong Lubok Bandan
Jementah (N02)	Welch	140/02/07	SK Ladang Welch
Jementah (N02)	Paya Jakas	140/02/08	SK Paya Jakas
Jementah (N02)	Bandar Jementah Barat	140/02/09	SA Jementah
Jementah (N02)	Bandar Jementah Timor	140/02/10	SMK Jementah
Jementah (N02)	Bandar Jementah Tengah	140/02/11	SJK (C) Jementah 1
Jementah (N02)	Bandar Jementah Selatan	140/02/12	Dewan Seberguna Jementah
Jementah (N02)	Jementah	140/02/13	SK Jementah
Jementah (N02)	Sungai Siput	140/02/14	Balai Raya Kampung Sg. Siput
Jementah (N02)	Kampong Bukit Tunggal	140/02/15	SK Bukit Tunggal
Jementah (N02)	Tebing Tinggi	140/02/16	SK Tebing Tinggi
Jementah (N02)	Gemereh	140/02/17	SK Gemereh
Jementah (N02)	Berata	140/02/18	SA Gemereh
Jementah (N02)	Jalam Kolam Air	140/02/19	SA Bandar Segamat
Jementah (N02)	Sungai Kapeh	140/02/20	SK Bukit Hampar
Jementah (N02)	Pasar	140/02/21	SJK (C) Seg Hwa
Jementah (N02)	Bandar	140/02/21	SJK (C) Seg Hwa
Jementah (N02)	Jalan Gemereh	140/02/23	SMK Gemereh
Jementah (N02)	Genuang	140/02/24	Dewan Seberguna Kampung Abdullah
Jementah (N02)	Genuang Selatan	140/02/25	Dewan Choon Chew Chee Kampung Abdullah
Jementah (N02)	Kampong Abdullah Utara	140/02/26	SJK (C) Li Chi

=== Representation history ===
Members of Parliament for Segamat
Parliament	No	Years	Member	Party	Vote Share
Federal Legislative Council
1st		1955–1959	Sardon Jubir (سعدون زبير)	Alliance (UMNO)	11,072; 81.90%
Constituency abolished, split into Segamat Selatan and Segamat Utara
Parliament of Malaysia
Constituency created from Segamat Utara, Segamat Selatan, Muar Utara and Muar Dalam
4th	P100	1974–1978	Lee San Choon (李三春)	BN (MCA)	17,369; 59.715
5th	P100	1978–1982	Lee San Choon (李三春)	BN (MCA)	22,098; 82.22%
6th	P100	1982–1986	Subramaniam Sinniah (சி. சுப்ரமணியம்)	BN (MIC)	20,932; 66.37%
7th	P115	1986–1990	Subramaniam Sinniah (சி. சுப்ரமணியம்)	BN (MIC)	18,644; 59.13%
8th	P115	1990–1995	S.S. Subramaniam (சி. சி. சுப்ரமணியம்)	BN (MIC)	20,070; 53.35%
9th	P125	1995–1999	Subramaniam Sinniah (சி. சுப்ரமணியம்)	BN (MIC)	28,710; 70.72%
10th	P125	1999–2004	Subramaniam Sinniah (சி. சுப்ரமணியம்)	BN (MIC)	26,350; 62.34%
11th	P140	2004–2008	Subramaniam Sathasivam (ச. சுப்ரமணியம்)	BN (MIC)	17,953; 63.90%
12th	P140	2008–2013	Subramaniam Sathasivam (ச. சுப்ரமணியம்)	BN (MIC)	15,291; 55.18%
13th	P140	2013–2018	Subramaniam Sathasivam (ச. சுப்ரமணியம்)	BN (MIC)	20,037; 51.57%
14th	P140	2018–2020	Santhara Kumar Ramanaidu (சந்தார்த்த குமார்)	PH (PKR)	24,060; 53.09%
14th	P140	2020–2022	Santhara Kumar Ramanaidu (சந்தார்த்த குமார்)	PN (BERSATU)	24,060; 53.09%
14th	P140	2022	Santhara Kumar Ramanaidu (சந்தார்த்த குமார்)	PBM	24,060; 53.09%
15th	P140	2022–present	Yuneswaran Ramaraj (யுனேஸ்வரன் ராமராஜ்)	PH (PKR)	23,437; 46.27%

From 1982 to 2018, the Member of Parliament for Segamat was always someone named "Subramaniam" from MIC, but they were three different individuals. From 1982 to 1990 and again from 1995 to 2004, the MP was Subramaniam Sinniah (commonly known as S. Subramaniam). Between 1990 and 1995, the seat was held by S.S. Subramaniam (commonly known as SS). From 2004 to 2018, the seat was represented by Subramaniam Sathasivam.

=== State constituency ===
Parliamentary constituency	State constituency						
Parliamentary constituency	1954–59*	1959–1974	1974–1986	1986–1995	1995–2004	2004–2018	2018–present
Segamat			Bandar Segamat				
Segamat			Bukit Serampang				
Segamat						Buloh Kasap	
Segamat				Jementah			
Segamat	Segamat North						
Segamat	Segamat South						
Segamat				Sepinang			

=== Historical boundaries ===
Parliamentary constituency	Area				
Parliamentary constituency	1974	1984	1994	2003	2018
Bandar Segamat	Bukit Siput; Buloh Kasap; Gemereh; Jementah; Segamat				
Bukit Serampang	Bukit Kepong; FELDA Lenga; FELDA Maokil; Kebun Baharu; Sagil				
Buloh Kasap				Buloh Kasap; Gelang Chinchin; Gemas Baru; Mensudut Pindah; Sepinang	
Jementah		Batu Anam; Gemereh; Jementah; Kampung Abdullah; Segamat			
Sepinang		Bandar IOI Segamat; Buloh Kasap; FELCRA Sekijang; FELDA Pemanis; Gemas Baru			

=== Current state assembly members ===
No.	State Constituency	Member	Coalition (Party)
N01	Buloh Kasap	Zahari Sarip	BN (UMNO)
N02	Jementah	See Ann Giap	BN (MCA)

=== Local governments & postcodes ===
No.	State Constituency	Local Government	Postcode
N01	Buloh Kasap	Segamat Municipal Council	85000 Segamat; 85100 Batu Anam; 85200 Jementah
N02	Jementah	Segamat Municipal Council	85000 Segamat; 85100 Batu Anam; 85200 Jementah

== Election results ==
Malaysian general election, 2022
Party	Candidate	Votes	%	∆%
PH	Yuneswaran Ramaraj	23,437	46.27	▲46.27
BN	Ramasamy Muthusamy	17,768	35.08	▼5.93
PN	Poobalan Ponusamy	8,385	16.55	▲16.55
PEJUANG	Syed Hairoul Faizey Syed Ali	1,062	2.10	▲2.10
Total valid votes		50,652	100.00	
Total rejected ballots		586		
Unreturned ballots		157		
Turnout		51,395	73.03	▼10.38
Registered electors		69,360		
Majority		5,669	11.19	▼0.89
PH hold		Swing		
Source(s) https://lom.agc.gov.my/ilims/upload/portal/akta/outputp/1753254/PUB%20617%20PARLIMEN%20JOHOR.pdf

Malaysian general election, 2018
Party	Candidate	Votes	%	∆%
PKR	Santhara Kumar Ramanaidu	24,060	53.09	▲4.66
BN	Subramaniam Sathasivam	18,584	41.01	▼10.56
PAS	Khairul Faizi Ahmad Kamil	2,676	5.90	▲5.90
Total valid votes		45,320	100.00	
Total rejected ballots		726		
Unreturned ballots		124		
Turnout		46,170	83.41	▼1.46
Registered electors		55,350		
Majority		5,476	12.08	▲8.94
PKR gain from BN		Swing		?
Source(s) "His Majesty's Government Gazette - Notice of Contested Election, Parliament for the State of Johore [P.U. (B) 244/2018]" (PDF). Attorney General's Chambers of Malaysia. 3 May 2018. Archived from the original (PDF) on 2019-12-29. "Federal Government Gazette - Results of Contested Election and Statements of the Poll after the Official Addition of Votes, Parliamentary Constituencies for the State of Johore [P.U. (B) 318/2018]" (PDF). Attorney General's Chambers of Malaysia. 28 May 2018.

Malaysian general election, 2013
Party	Candidate	Votes	%	∆%
BN	Subramaniam Sathasivam	20,037	51.57	▼3.61
PKR	Chua Jui Meng	18,820	48.43	▲48.43
Total valid votes		38,857	100.00	
Total rejected ballots		950		
Unreturned ballots		88		
Turnout		39,895	84.87	▲11.91
Registered electors		47,009		
Majority		1,217	3.14	▼7.22
BN hold		Swing		
Source(s) "Federal Government Gazette - Notice of Contested Election, Parliament for the State of Johore [P.U. (B) 181/2013]" (PDF). Attorney General's Chambers of Malaysia. 26 April 2013. "Federal Government Gazette - Results of Contested Election and Statements of the Poll after the Official Addition of Votes, Parliamentary Constituencies for the State of Johore [P.U. (B) 222/2013]" (PDF). Attorney General's Chambers of Malaysia. 22 May 2013.

Malaysian general election, 2008
Party	Candidate	Votes	%	∆%
BN	Subramaniam Sathasivam	15,921	55.18	▼8.72
DAP	Pang Hok Liong	12,930	44.82	▲8.72
Total valid votes		28,851	100.00	
Total rejected ballots		847		
Unreturned ballots		1		
Turnout		29,699	72.96	▲2.26
Registered electors		40,708		
Majority		2,991	10.36	▼17.44
BN hold		Swing		

Malaysian general election, 2004
Party	Candidate	Votes	%	∆%
BN	Subramaniam Sathasivam	17,953	63.90	▲1.56
DAP	Pang Hok Liong	10,144	36.10	▼1.56
Total valid votes		28,097	100.00	
Total rejected ballots		876		
Unreturned ballots		1		
Turnout		28,974	70.70	▼0.97
Registered electors		40,981		
Majority		7,809	27.80	▲3.12
BN hold		Swing		

Malaysian general election, 1999
Party	Candidate	Votes	%	∆%
BN	Subramaniam Sinniah	26,350	62.34	▼8.38
DAP	Tee Gey Yan	15,921	37.66	▲10.21
Total valid votes		42,271	100.00	
Total rejected ballots		1,188		
Unreturned ballots		107		
Turnout		43,566	71.67	▼1.08
Registered electors		60,786		
Majority		10,429	24.68	▼18.59
BN hold		Swing		

Malaysian general election, 1995
Party	Candidate	Votes	%	∆%
BN	Subramaniam Sinniah	28,710	70.72	▲17.37
DAP	Yaakob Jantan	11,143	27.45	▼19.20
Independent	Lim Wah Kin	741	1.83	▲1.83
Total valid votes		40,594	100.00	
Total rejected ballots		1,391		
Unreturned ballots		46		
Turnout		42,031	72.75	▼0.93
Registered electors		57,774		
Majority		17,567	43.27	▲36.57
BN hold		Swing		

Malaysian general election, 1990
Party	Candidate	Votes	%	∆%
BN	S.S. Subramaniam	20,070	53.35	▼5.78
DAP	Simon Tong Tiam Hock	17,549	46.65	▲8.23
Total valid votes		37,619	100.00	
Total rejected ballots		1,156		
Unreturned ballots		0		
Turnout		38,775	73.68	▼0.06
Registered electors		52,628		
Majority		2,521	6.70	▼14.01
BN hold		Swing		

Malaysian general election, 1986
Party	Candidate	Votes	%	∆%
BN	Subramaniam Sinniah	18,644	59.13	▼7.24
DAP	Chan Yiek Nung	12,115	38.42	▲6.95
PAS	Abdul Razak Daud	771	2.45	▲2.45
Total valid votes		31,530	100.00	
Total rejected ballots		920		
Unreturned ballots		0		
Turnout		32,450	73.74	▼5.84
Registered electors		44,007		
Majority		6,529	20.71	▼14.19
BN hold		Swing		

Malaysian general election, 1982
Party	Candidate	Votes	%	∆%
BN	Subramaniam Sinniah	20,932	66.37	▼15.85
DAP	Tan Tien Lim	9,925	31.47	▲31.47
Independent	Hee Moi @ Hooi Kai	683	2.17	▲2.17
Total valid votes		31,540	100.00	
Total rejected ballots		1,305		
Unreturned ballots		0		
Turnout		32,845	79.58	▼1.63
Registered electors		41,273		
Majority		11,007	34.90	▼29.54
BN hold		Swing		

Malaysian general election, 1978
Party	Candidate	Votes	%	∆%
BN	Lee San Choon	22,098	82.22	▲7.80
PAS	Abdul Hak Fadzil	4,780	17.78	▲17.78
Total valid votes		26,878	100.00	
Total rejected ballots		1,945		
Unreturned ballots		0		
Turnout		28,823	81.21	▼0.07
Registered electors		35,493		
Majority		17,318	64.44	▲15.60
BN hold		Swing		

Malaysian general election, 1974
Party	Candidate	Votes	%	∆%
BN	Lee San Choon	17,369	74.42	▲74.42
DAP	Lee Ah Meng	5,971	25.58	▲23.58
Total valid votes		23,340	100.00	
Total rejected ballots		958		
Unreturned ballots		0		
Turnout		24,298	81.28	
Registered electors		29,896		
Majority		11,398	48.84	
BN hold		Swing		

Malayan general election, 1955
Party	Candidate	Votes	%
Alliance	Sardon Jubir	11,072	81.90
NEGARA	Razali Abdul Manap	2,447	18.10
Total valid votes		13,519	100.00
Total rejected ballots			
Unreturned ballots			
Turnout		13,519	79.45
Registered electors		17,016	
Majority		6,438	63.80
This was a new constituency created.
Source(s): The Straits Times.
