= Aaron Ago Dagang =

Malaysian politician

Yang Berhormat Dato Sri Aaron Ago Dagang PJN PNBS MP
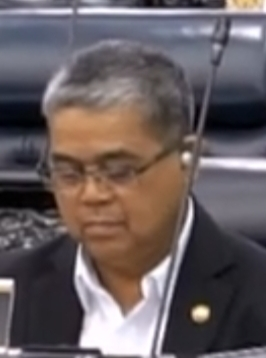

Minister of National Unity
- Incumbent
- Assumed office 3 December 2022
- Monarchs: Abdullah (2022–2024); Ibrahim Iskandar (since 2024)
- Prime Minister: Anwar Ibrahim
- Deputy: Saraswathy Kandasami (2023-2025); Yuneswaran Ramaraj (since 2025)
- Preceded by: Halimah Mohamed Sadique
- Constituency: Kanowit

Deputy Minister of Health II
- In office 30 August 2021 – 24 November 2022
- Monarch: Abdullah
- Prime Minister: Ismail Sabri Yaakob
- Minister: Khairy Jamaluddin
- Preceded by: Himself
- Succeeded by: Lukanisman Awang Sauni (Deputy Minister of Health)
- Constituency: Kanowit
- In office 10 March 2020 – 16 August 2021
- Monarch: Abdullah
- Prime Minister: Muhyiddin Yassin
- Minister: Adham Baba
- Preceded by: Lee Boon Chye (Deputy Minister of Health)
- Succeeded by: Himself
- Constituency: Kanowit

Member of the Malaysian Parliament for Kanowit
- Incumbent
- Assumed office 21 March 2004
- Preceded by: Leo Moggie Irok (BN–PBDS)
- Majority: 2,057 (2004); Walkover (2008); 3,042 (2013); 4,312 (2018); 236 (2022)

Faction represented in Dewan Rakyat
- 2004–2018: Barisan Nasional
- 2018: Parti Rakyat Sarawak
- 2018–: Gabungan Parti Sarawak

Personal details
- Born: Aaron Ago anak Dagang; 12 December 1958 (age 67) Crown Colony of Sarawak (now Sarawak, Malaysia)
- Party: Sarawak Progressive Democratic Party (SPDP); Parti Rakyat Sarawak (PRS)
- Other political affiliations: Barisan Nasional (BN) (–2018); Gabungan Parti Sarawak (GPS) (since 2018)
- Spouse: Rowenna Ping Bungan
- Occupation: Politician

Aaron Ago anak Dagang (born 12 December 1958) is a Malaysian politician who has served as the Minister of National Unity in the Unity Government administration under Prime Minister Anwar Ibrahim since December 2022 and the Member of Parliament (MP) for Kanowit since March 2004. He served as the Deputy Minister of Health II for the second term in the Barisan Nasional (BN) administration under former Prime Minister Ismail Sabri Yaakob and former Minister Khairy Jamaluddin from August 2021 to the collapse of the BN administration in November 2022 and his first term in the Perikatan Nasional (PN) administration under former Prime Minister Muhyiddin Yassin and former Minister Adham Baba from March 2020 to August 2021. He is a member of the Parti Rakyat Sarawak (PRS), a component party of the Gabungan Parti Sarawak (GPS) coalition.

Before entering the Parliament, he was the political secretary to the former Minister for Energy, Communications and Multimedia, Leo Moggie Irok. He then replaced Moggie in the Kanowit federal seat when the latter stepped down from politics during the 2004 general elections. After the election, his Sarawak Native People's Party (PBDS) was de-registered, he then joined the Sarawak Progressive Democratic Party (SPDP) and later the PRS. He retained the Kanowit seat in the 2008 election unopposed.

== Election results ==
Parliament of Malaysia
Year	Constituency	Candidate	Votes	Pct	Opponent(s)	Votes	Pct	Ballot casts	Majority	Turnout
2004	P209 Kanowit	Aaron Ago Dagang (PBDS)	6,438	59.51%	Frederick Bunsu Janton (IND)	4,381	40.49%	11,022	2,057	60.62%
2008	P210 Kanowit	Aaron Ago Dagang (PRS)	Walkover							
2013	P210 Kanowit	Aaron Ago Dagang (PRS)	8,046	59.75%	Thomas Laja Besi (PKR)	5,004	37.16%	13,759	3,042	70.80%
2013	P210 Kanowit	Aaron Ago Dagang (PRS)	8,046	59.75%	Ellison Ludan (SWP)	417	3.10%	13,759	3,042	70.80%
2018	P210 Kanowit	Aaron Ago Dagang (PRS)	9,552	64.58%	Satu Anchom (PKR)	5,240	35.42%	15,149	4,312	72.06%
2022	P210 Kanowit	Aaron Ago Dagang (PRS)	7,411	41.07%	Joseph Nyambong (PKR)	7,175	39.77%	18,043	236	58.23%
2022	P210 Kanowit	Aaron Ago Dagang (PRS)	7,411	41.07%	Michael Lias (IND)	2,289	12.69%	18,043	236	58.23%
2022	P210 Kanowit	Aaron Ago Dagang (PRS)	7,411	41.07%	George Chen (IND)	741	4.11%	18,043	236	58.23%
2022	P210 Kanowit	Aaron Ago Dagang (PRS)	7,411	41.07%	Elli Luhat (IND)	427	2.37%	18,043	236	58.23%

== Honours ==
=== Honours of Malaysia ===
- Malaysia
  - Commander of the Order of Meritorious Service (PJN) – Datuk (2010)
  - Recipient of the 17th Yang di-Pertuan Agong Installation Medal (2024)
- Sarawak
  - Knight Commander of the Order of the Star of Sarawak (PNBS) – Dato Sri (2023)
  - Gold Medal of the Sarawak Independence Diamond Jubilee Medal (2023)
