= Merbok (federal constituency) =

Federal constituency of Kedah, Malaysia

Merbok (P014)
Kedah constituency

Federal constituency
- Legislature: Dewan Rakyat
- MP: Mohd Nazri Abu Hassan; PN
- Constituency created: 1984
- First contested: 1986
- Last contested: 2022

Demographics
- Population (2020): 215,367
- Electors (2023): 134,147
- Area (km²): 451
- Pop. density (per km²): 477.5

Merbok is a federal constituency in Kuala Muda District, Kedah, Malaysia, that has been represented in the Dewan Rakyat since 1986.

The federal constituency was created in the 1984 redistribution and is mandated to return a single member to the Dewan Rakyat under the first past the post voting system.

== Demographics ==
https://live.chinapress.com.my/ge15/parliament/KEDAH

Ethnic breakdown of Merbok's electorate as of 2022
1. Malay (69.9%)
2. Chinese (15.3%)
3. Indian (14.2%)
4. Other ethnicities (0.50%)

As of 2020, Merbok has a population of 216,357 people.

Age breakdown of Merbok's electorate as of 2022
1. 18-20 (7.66%)
2. 21-29 (25.1%)
3. 30-39 (22.8%)
4. 40-49 (16.5%)
5. 50-59 (13.0%)
6. 60-69 (9.63%)
7. 70-79 (4.01%)
8. 80-89 (1.08%)
9. above 90 (0.22%)
Gender breakdown of Merbok's electorate as of 2022
1. Male (49.7%)
2. Female (50.3%)

== History ==
=== Polling districts ===
According to the federal gazette issued on 18 July 2023, the Merbok constituency is divided into 40 polling districts.

| State constituency | Polling Districts | Code | Location |
|---|---|---|---|
| Bukit Selambau (N25） | Kuala Sin | 014/25/01 | SK Kampung Kuala Sin |
| Bukit Selambau (N25） | Kampung Sungkap | 014/25/02 | SK Bukit Selambau |
| Bukit Selambau (N25） | Bukit Lembu | 014/25/03 | SK Aman Jaya |
| Bukit Selambau (N25） | Taman Bandar Baru | 014/25/04 | SMK Aman Jaya; SK Bandar Baru Sungai Lalang |
| Bukit Selambau (N25） | Sungai Lalang | 014/25/05 | SJK (C) Chung Hwa |
| Bukit Selambau (N25） | Taman Desa Aman | 014/25/06 | SK Sungai Lalang |
| Bukit Selambau (N25） | Bandar Laguna Merbok | 014/25/07 | SK Bandar Laguna Merbok |
| Bukit Selambau (N25） | Tasek Apong | 014/25/08 | SK Tasek Apong |
| Bukit Selambau (N25） | Air Mendidih | 014/25/09 | SJK (T) Saraswathy |
| Bukit Selambau (N25） | Jalan Badlishah | 014/25/10 | Dewan Kompleks Penyayang, Jabatan Kebajikan Masyarakat Derah Kuala Muda |
| Bukit Selambau (N25） | Taman Peruda | 014/25/11 | SMK Bandar Sungai Petani |
| Bukit Selambau (N25） | Taman Ria Utara | 014/25/12 | SK Taman Ria |
| Bukit Selambau (N25） | United Petani | 014/25/13 | SJK (T) Arumugam Pillai |
| Bukit Selambau (N25） | Patani Para | 014/25/14 | SK Patani Para |
| Bukit Selambau (N25） | Bukit Rusa | 014/35/15 | SJK (T) Palanisamy Kumaran; SMK Taman Ria |
| Bukit Selambau (N25） | Pekan Bukit Selambau | 014/25/16 | SJK (C) Fuh Sun |
| Bukit Selambau (N25） | Kampung Pokok Machang | 014/25/17 | SMK Bukit Selambau |
| Bukit Selambau (N25） | Batu Belachan | 014/25/18 | SK Seri Wangsa |
| Bukit Selambau (N25） | Titi Panjang | 014/25/19 | SK Dataran Muda |
| Bukit Selambau (N25） | Ambangan Height | 014/25/20 | SK Ambangan Height |
| Bukit Selambau (N25） | Taman Ria Selatan | 014/25/21 | Kolej Vokasional Sungai Petani 1 |
| Tanjong Dawai (N26) | Bujang | 014/26/01 | MRSM Merbok |
| Tanjong Dawai (N26) | Pekan Sabtu Merbok | 014/26/02 | SJK (C) Sin Hwa |
| Tanjong Dawai (N26) | Simpang Tiga Pasir | 014/26/03 | SK Merbok (Pusat) |
| Tanjong Dawai (N26) | Pekan Merbok | 014/26/04 | SMK Merbok |
| Tanjong Dawai (N26) | Kampung Pasir | 014/26/05 | SK Kampong Pasir |
| Tanjong Dawai (N26) | Kampung Huma | 014/26/06 | SK Tanjong Dawai |
| Tanjong Dawai (N26) | Tanjong Dawai | 014/26/07 | SJK (C) Choong Cheng |
| Tanjong Dawai (N26) | Batu Hampar | 014/26/08 | SK Batu Hampar |
| Tanjong Dawai (N26) | Pengkalan Bujang | 014/26/09 | SK Haji Omar Tahir |
| Tanjong Dawai (N26) | Sungai Gelam | 014/26/10 | SK Sultan Mudzaffar Shah |
| Tanjong Dawai (N26) | Sungai Jagong | 014/26/11 | SA Daris |
| Tanjong Dawai (N26) | Sungai Layar | 014/26/12 | SK Sungai Layar |
| Tanjong Dawai (N26) | Semeling Kanan | 014/26/13 | SK Semeling |
| Tanjong Dawai (N26) | Semeling Kiri | 014/26/14 | SJK (C) Ching Chong |
| Tanjong Dawai (N26) | Kampung Bedong | 014/16/15 | SMK Bedong |
| Tanjong Dawai (N26) | Taman Orkid | 014/26/16 | SMK Sungai Layar |
| Tanjong Dawai (N26) | Taman Sri Tanjong | 014/26/17 | SK Tuan Syed Jan Al-Jaffri |
| Tanjong Dawai (N26) | Bunga Raya | 014/26/18 | SMK Ibrahim |
| Tanjong Dawai (N26) | Sekolah Ibrahim | 014/26/19 | SK Ibrahim |

=== Representation history ===
Members of Parliament for Merbok
| Parliament | No | Years | Member | Party | Vote Share |
Constituency created from Kuala Muda, Jerai and Sungai Petani
| 7th | P011 | 1986–1990 | Abdul Daim Zainuddin (دائم زين الدين) | BN (UMNO) | 20,712; 74.83% |
| 8th | P011 | 1990–1995 | Abdul Daim Zainuddin (دائم زين الدين) | BN (UMNO) | 25,749; 72.22% |
| 9th | P014 | 1995–1999 | Abdul Daim Zainuddin (دائم زين الدين) | BN (UMNO) | 31,125; 77.72% |
| 10th | P014 | 1999–2004 | Abdul Daim Zainuddin (دائم زين الدين) | BN (UMNO) | 30,285; 67.01% |
| 11th | P014 | 2004–2008 | Zainuddin Maidin (زين الدين بن ميدين) | BN (UMNO) | 29,607; 67.64% |
| 12th | P014 | 2008–2013 | Rashid Din (رشيد دين) | PR (PKR) | 25,541; 52.23% |
| 13th | P014 | 2013–2018 | Ismail Daut (إسماعيل داود) | BN (UMNO) | 38,538; 52.83% |
| 14th | P014 | 2018–2022 | Nor Azrina Surip (نورعصرنا بنت سوريڤ) | PH (PKR) | 30,902; 43.91% |
| 15th | P014 | 2022–present | Mohd Nazri Abu Hassan (محمد نازري ابو حسن) | PN (BERSATU) | 52,573; 51.27% |

=== State constituency ===
| Parliamentary constituency | State constituency | | | | | | |
| Parliamentary constituency | 1955–1959* | 1959–1974 | 1974–1986 | 1986–1995 | 1995–2004 | 2004–2018 | 2018–present |
|---|---|---|---|---|---|---|---|
| Merbok | | | | | Bukit Selambau | | |
| Merbok | | | | Gurun | | | |
| Merbok | | | | Tanjong Dawai | | | |

=== Historical boundaries ===
| State Constituency | Area | | | |
| State Constituency | 1984 | 1994 | 2003 | 2018 |
|---|---|---|---|---|
| Bukit Selambau | | Bukit Selambau; Kuala Sin; Laguna Merbok; Sungai Lalang; Taman Ria Jaya | | Ambangan Height; Bukit Selambau; Kuala Sin; Laguna Merbok; Sungai Lalang |
| Gurun | Bedong; Bujang; Merbok; Gurun; Semeling | Bedong; Gurun; Jeniang; Kampung Lombong Batu Satu; Taman Desa Jaya Indah | | |
| Tanjong Dawai | Ambangan Heights; Lagenda Heights; Laguna Merbok; Sungai Lalang; Tanjung Dawai | Bujang; Kampung Huma; Merbok; Semeling; Tanjung Dawai | Bujang; Merbok; Semeling; Sungai Layar; Tanjung Dawai | |

=== Current state assembly members ===
| No. | State Constituency | Member | Coalition (Party) |
|---|---|---|---|
| N25 | Bukit Selambau | Azizan Hamzah | PN (PAS) |
| N26 | Tanjong Dawai | Hanif Ghazali | PN (PAS) |

=== Local governments & postcodes ===
| No. | State Constituency | Local Government | Postcode |
|---|---|---|---|
| N25 | Bukit Selambau | Sungai Petani Municipal Council | 08000, 08010 Sungai Petani |
| N26 | Tanjong Dawai | Sungai Petani Municipal Council | 08000, 08010 Sungai Petani |

== Election results ==
Malaysian general election, 2022
| Party | Candidate | Votes | % | ∆% |
|---|---|---|---|---|
| PN | Mohd Nazri Abu Hassan | 52,573 | 51.27 | ▲51.27 |
| PH | Nor Azrina Surip | 31,554 | 30.77 | ▲30.77 |
| BN | Shaiful Hazizy Zainol Abidin | 16,691 | 16.28 | ▼12.91 |
| PEJUANG | Mohd Mosin Abdul Razak | 1,201 | 1.17 | ▲1.17 |
| Heritage | Khairul Anuar Ahmad | 525 | 0.51 | ▲0.51 |
| Total valid votes | | 102,544 | 100.00 | |
| Total rejected ballots | | 1,027 | | |
| Unreturned ballots | | 208 | | |
| Turnout | | 103,799 | 80.51 | ▼2.32 |
| Registered electors | | 132,444 | | |
| Majority | | 21,019 | 20.50 | ▲6.38 |
| PN gain from PKR | | Swing | | ? |
Source(s) https://lom.agc.gov.my/ilims/upload/portal/akta/outputp/1753260/PUB%20606%20(2022).pdf

Malaysian general election, 2018
| Party | Candidate | Votes | % | ∆% |
|---|---|---|---|---|
| PKR | Nor Azrina Surip | 30,902 | 43.31 | ▼3.86 |
| BN | Tajul Urus Mat Zain | 20,830 | 29.19 | ▼23.64 |
| PAS | Ahmad Fauzi Ramli | 19,618 | 27.50 | ▲27.50 |
| Total valid votes | | 71,350 | 100.00 | |
| Total rejected ballots | | 1,108 | | |
| Unreturned ballots | | 250 | | |
| Turnout | | 72,708 | 82.83 | ▼3.91 |
| Registered electors | | 87,782 | | |
| Majority | | 10,072 | 14.12 | ▲8.46 |
| PKR gain from BN | | Swing | | ? |
Source(s) "His Majesty's Government Gazette - Notice of Contested Election, Parliament for the State of Kedah [P.U. (B) 233/2018]" (PDF). Attorney General's Chambers of Malaysia. 3 May 2018. "Federal Government Gazette - Results of Contested Election and Statements of the Poll after the Official Addition of Votes, Parliamentary Constituencies for the State of Kedah [P.U. (B) 307/2018]" (PDF). Attorney General's Chambers of Malaysia. 28 May 2018.

Malaysian general election, 2013
| Party | Candidate | Votes | % | ∆% |
|---|---|---|---|---|
| BN | Ismail Daut | 38,538 | 52.83 | ▲6.06 |
| PKR | Nor Azrina Surip | 34,416 | 47.17 | ▼6.06 |
| Total valid votes | | 72,954 | 100.00 | |
| Total rejected ballots | | 1,340 | | |
| Unreturned ballots | | 226 | | |
| Turnout | | 74,520 | 86.74 | ▲9.59 |
| Registered electors | | 85,908 | | |
| Majority | | 4,122 | 5.66 | ▼0.80 |
| BN gain from PKR | | Swing | | ? |
Source(s) "Federal Government Gazette - Notice of Contested Election, Parliament for the State of Kedah [P.U. (B) 170/2013]" (PDF). Attorney General's Chambers of Malaysia. 26 April 2013. "Federal Government Gazette - Results of Contested Election and Statements of the Poll after the Official Addition of Votes, Parliamentary Constituencies for the State of Kedah [P.U. (B) 211/2013]" (PDF). Attorney General's Chambers of Malaysia. 22 May 2013.

Malaysian general election, 2008
| Party | Candidate | Votes | % | ∆% |
|---|---|---|---|---|
| PKR | Rashid Din | 25,541 | 53.23 | ▲20.87 |
| BN | Tajul Urus Mat Zain | 22,443 | 46.77 | ▼20.87 |
| Total valid votes | | 47,984 | 100.00 | |
| Total rejected ballots | | 1,338 | | |
| Unreturned ballots | | 396 | | |
| Turnout | | 49,718 | 77.15 | ▼0.51 |
| Registered electors | | 64,443 | | |
| Majority | | 3,098 | 6.46 | ▼28.82 |
| PKR gain from BN | | Swing | | ? |

Malaysian general election, 2004
| Party | Candidate | Votes | % | ∆% |
|---|---|---|---|---|
| BN | Zainuddin Maidin | 29,607 | 67.64 | ▲0.63 |
| PKR | Saiful Izham Ramli | 14,162 | 32.36 | ▼0.63 |
| Total valid votes | | 43,769 | 100.00 | |
| Total rejected ballots | | 1,142 | | |
| Unreturned ballots | | 70 | | |
| Turnout | | 44,981 | 77.66 | ▲4.47 |
| Registered electors | | 57,920 | | |
| Majority | | 15,445 | 35.28 | ▲1.26 |
| BN hold | | Swing | | |

Malaysian general election, 1999
| Party | Candidate | Votes | % | ∆% |
|---|---|---|---|---|
| BN | Abdul Daim Zainuddin | 30,285 | 67.01 | ▼10.71 |
| PKR | Mocktar Mansor | 14,909 | 32.99 | ▲32.99 |
| Total valid votes | | 45,194 | 100.00 | |
| Total rejected ballots | | 1,353 | | |
| Unreturned ballots | | 52 | | |
| Turnout | | 46,599 | 73.19 | ▲2.63 |
| Registered electors | | 63,668 | | |
| Majority | | 15,376 | 34.02 | ▼21.42 |
| BN hold | | Swing | | |

Malaysian general election, 1995
| Party | Candidate | Votes | % | ∆% |
|---|---|---|---|---|
| BN | Abdul Daim Zainuddin | 31,125 | 77.72 | ▲5.50 |
| S46 | Maheran Muktar | 8,924 | 22.28 | ▼5.50 |
| Total valid votes | | 40,049 | 100.00 | |
| Total rejected ballots | | 1,892 | | |
| Unreturned ballots | | 0 | | |
| Turnout | | 41,941 | 70.56 | ▼2.15 |
| Registered electors | | 59,440 | | |
| Majority | | 22,201 | 55.44 | ▲11.00 |
| BN hold | | Swing | | |

Malaysian general election, 1990
| Party | Candidate | Votes | % | ∆% |
|---|---|---|---|---|
| BN | Abdul Daim Zainuddin | 25,749 | 72.22 | ▼2.61 |
| S46 | Mohd Johari Abidin | 9,906 | 27.78 | ▲27.78 |
| Total valid votes | | 35,655 | 100.00 | |
| Total rejected ballots | | 1,176 | | |
| Unreturned ballots | | 0 | | |
| Turnout | | 36,831 | 72.71 | ▲2.59 |
| Registered electors | | 50,657 | | |
| Majority | | 15,843 | 44.44 | ▼5.22 |
| BN hold | | Swing | | |

Malaysian general election, 1986
| Party | Candidate | Votes | % |
|---|---|---|---|
| BN | Abdul Daim Zainuddin | 20,712 | 74.83 |
| PAS | Redhuan Oon | 6,967 | 25.17 |
| Total valid votes | | 27,679 | 100.00 |
| Total rejected ballots | | 816 | |
| Unreturned ballots | | 0 | |
| Turnout | | 28,495 | 70.12 |
| Registered electors | | 40,636 | |
| Majority | | 13,745 | 49.66 |
This was a new constituency created.
