= Mohd Nazri Abu Hassan =

Malaysian politician

Yang Berhormat Tuan Mohd Nazri Abu Hassan AMK MP
- مُحَمَّد نَذْرِي أَبُو حَسَّان

Member of the Malaysian Parliament for Merbok
- Incumbent
- Assumed office 19 November 2022
- Preceded by: Nor Azrina Surip (PH–PKR)
- Majority: 21,019 (2022)

Personal details
- Born: Mohd Nazri bin Abu Hassan Malaysia
- Party: Malaysian United Indigenous Party (BERSATU)
- Other political affiliations: Pakatan Harapan (PH) (–2020); Perikatan Nasional (PN) (since 2020)
- Occupation: Politician

Mohd Nazri bin Abu Hassan is a Malaysian politician who has served as the Member of Parliament (MP) for Merbok since November 2022. He is a member of the Malaysian United Indigenous Party (BERSATU), a component party of the Perikatan Nasional (PN) coalition.

== Election results ==
Kedah State Legislative Assembly
Year	Constituency	Candidate	Votes	Pct	Opponent(s)	Votes	Pct	Ballots cast	Majority	Turnout
2018	N24 Jeneri	Mohd Nazri Abu Hassan (BERSATU)	4,146	18.07%	Muhammad Sanusi Md Nor (PAS)	10,626	46.32%	27,641	2,455	84.70%
2018	N24 Jeneri	Mohd Nazri Abu Hassan (BERSATU)	4,146	18.07%	Mahadzir Abdul Hamid (UMNO)	8,117	35.61%	27,641	2,455	84.70%

Parliament of Malaysia
Year	Constituency	Candidate	Votes	Pct	Opponent(s)	Votes	Pct	Ballots cast	Majority	Turnout
2022	P014 Merbok	Mohd Nazri Abu Hassan (BERSATU)	52,573	51.27%	Nor Azrina Surip (PKR)	31,554	30.77%	103,799	21,019	80.51%
2022	P014 Merbok	Mohd Nazri Abu Hassan (BERSATU)	52,573	51.27%	Shaiful Hazizy Zainol Abidin (UMNO)	16,691	16.28%	103,799	21,019	80.51%
2022	P014 Merbok	Mohd Nazri Abu Hassan (BERSATU)	52,573	51.27%	Mohd Mosin Abdul Razak (IMAN)	1,201	1.17%	103,799	21,019	80.51%
2022	P014 Merbok	Mohd Nazri Abu Hassan (BERSATU)	52,573	51.27%	Khairul Anuar Ahmad (WARISAN)	525	0.51%	103,799	21,019	80.51%

== Honours ==
=== Honours of Malaysia ===
- Malaysia
  - Recipient of the 17th Yang di-Pertuan Agong Installation Medal (2024)
- Kedah
  - Member of the Order of the Crown of Kedah (AMK) (2025)

== See also ==
- Merbok (federal constituency)
- Members of the Dewan Rakyat, 15th Malaysian Parliament
