= Nor Azrina Surip =

Malaysian politician

- نورعصرنا سوريڤ

Political Secretary to the Minister in the Prime Minister's Department (Federal Territories)
- Incumbent
- Assumed office 27 January 2024
- Prime Minister: Anwar Ibrahim
- Minister: Zaliha Mustafa

State Chairwoman of the People's Justice Party of Kedah
- Incumbent
- Assumed office 20 February 2024
- President: Anwar Ibrahim
- Deputy: Zamri Yusuf
- Preceded by: Nurul Izzah Anwar

Member of the Malaysian Parliament for Merbok
- In office 9 May 2018 – 19 November 2022
- Preceded by: Ismail Daut (BN–UMNO)
- Succeeded by: Mohd Nazri Abu Hassan (PN–BERSATU)
- Majority: 10,072 (2018)

Personal details
- Born: Nor Azrina binti Surip; 25 October 1975 (age 50) Selangor, Malaysia
- Citizenship: Malaysian
- Party: People's Justice Party (PKR)
- Other political affiliations: Pakatan Rakyat (PR) (2008–2015); Pakatan Harapan (PH) (since 2015)
- Education: Universiti Teknologi Malaysia (DipEng, BEng); Universiti Sains Malaysia (MSc)
- Occupation: Politician
- Profession: Engineer

Nor Azrina binti Surip @ Nurin Aina Abdullah (born 25 October 1975) is a Malaysian politician who served as the Member of Parliament (MP) for Merbok from May 2018 to November 2022. She is a member and the State Chairwoman of Kedah of the People's Justice Party (PKR), a component party of the Pakatan Harapan (PH) and formerly Pakatan Rakyat (PR) coalitions.

== Early life and education ==
Nor Azrina binti Surip was born in Selangor, Malaysia. She received her Diploma in Civil Engineering in 1996 and Bachelor of Civil Engineering in 1999 from Universiti Teknologi Malaysia and Master of Science in Environmental Engineering in 2005 from Universiti Sains Malaysia.

== Early career ==
She worked as a research officer in Research Management Centre (RMC), Universiti Teknologi Malaysia, Skudai, Johor from 2001 until 2004. Then, she worked as an environmental engineer at Perunding Mojass, Bandar Darul Aman, Kedah in 2006 and served as the board member for Darulaman Realty Sdn Bhd from 2008 until 2010 and Kedah Sato Sdn Bhd from 2011 until 2012.

== Political career ==
She served as chief woman for Pakatan Harapan in Kedah.

== Election results ==
Parliament of Malaysia
Year	Constituency	Candidate	Votes	Pct	Opponent(s)	Votes	Pct	Ballots cast	Majority	Turnout
2013	P014 Merbok	Nor Azrina Surip (PKR)	34,416	47.17%	Ismail Daut (UMNO)	38,538	52.83%	74,520	4,122	86.74%
2018	P014 Merbok	Nor Azrina Surip (PKR)	30,902	43.31%	Tajul Urus Mat Zain (UMNO)	20,830	29.19%	72,708	10,072	82.83%
2018	P014 Merbok	Nor Azrina Surip (PKR)	30,902	43.31%	Ahmad Fauzi Ramli (PAS)	19,618	27.50%	72,708	10,072	82.83%
2022	P014 Merbok	Nor Azrina Surip (PKR)	31,554	30.77%	Mohd Nazri Abu Hassan (BERSATU)	52,573	51.27%	103,799	21,019	80.51%
2022	P014 Merbok	Nor Azrina Surip (PKR)	31,554	30.77%	Shaiful Hazizy Zainol Abidin (UMNO)	16,691	16.28%	103,799	21,019	80.51%
2022	P014 Merbok	Nor Azrina Surip (PKR)	31,554	30.77%	Mohd Mosin Abdul Razak (IMAN)	1,201	1.17%	103,799	21,019	80.51%
2022	P014 Merbok	Nor Azrina Surip (PKR)	31,554	30.77%	Khairul Anuar Ahmad (WARISAN)	525	0.51%	103,799	21,019	80.51%
