= Shaiful Hazizy Zainol Abidin =

Malaysian politician

Yang Berbahagia Dato' Shaiful Hazizy Zainol Abidin DIMP
- صيفال هزيزي زاينول عابدين
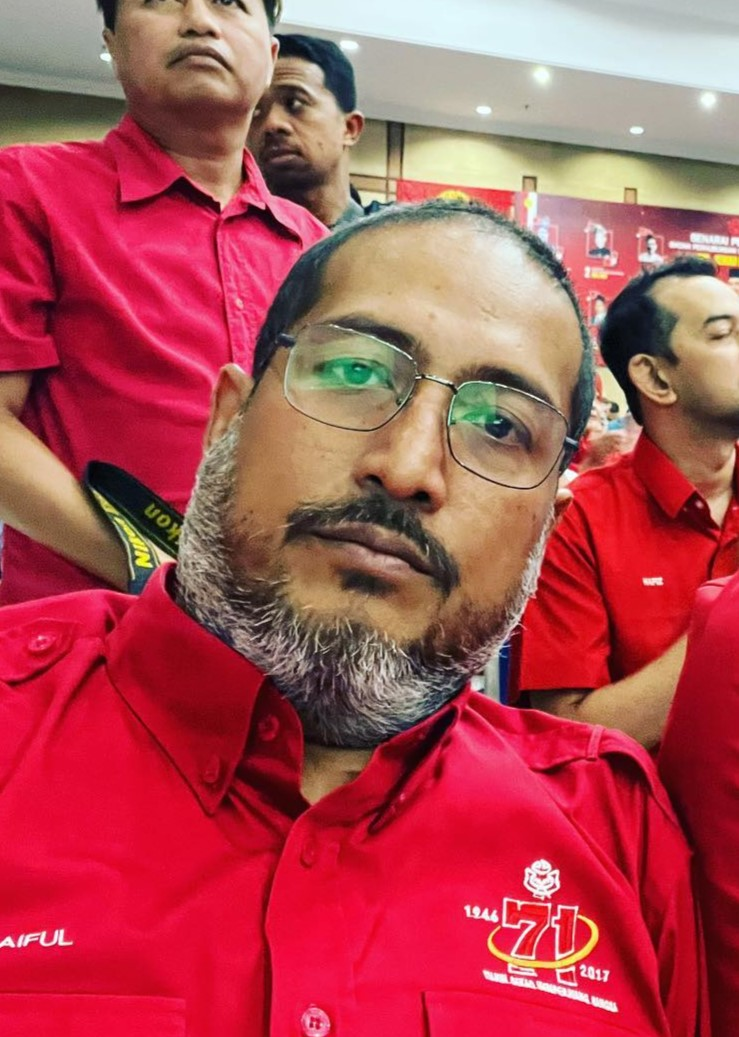
- Shaiful Hazizy in 2023

State Information Chief of the United Malays National Organisation of Kedah
- Incumbent
- Assumed office 2022
- Chairman: Jamil Khir Baharom; Mahdzir Khalid

State Information Chief of the Barisan Nasional of Kedah
- Incumbent
- Assumed office 2022
- Chairman / State Coordinator: Jamil Khir Baharom; Mahdzir Khalid

Personal details
- Born: Shaiful Hazizy bin Zainol Abidin; 28 May 1976 (age 49) Kuala Lumpur, Malaysia
- Party: United Malays National Organisation (UMNO) (since 2002)
- Other political affiliations: Barisan Nasional (BN) (since 2002)
- Spouse: Murni Ali
- Education: Seri Aman Primary School; Kedah Religious High School
- Alma mater: International Islamic University Malaysia (BA, MA)
- Occupation: Politician, businessman
- Nickname: Tok Pon

Shaiful Hazizy bin Zainol Abidin (Jawi: صيفال هزيزي زاينول عابدين; born 28 May 1976), better known by the nickname Tok Pon, is a Malaysian politician and businessman who served as the State Information Chief of Kedah of United Malay National Organisation and State Information Chief of Kedah of Barisan Nasional since 2022. He also served as Political Secretary to the Menteri Besar of Kedah, Ahmad Bashah Md Hanipah. He is the member and Division Chief of Merbok of United Malays National Organisation (UMNO), a component party of Barisan Nasional (BN) coalitions.

== Early life and education ==
Shaiful Hazizy bin Zainol Abidin was born on 28 May 1976 in Kuala Lumpur, Malaysia. He received his early education at Seri Aman Primary School, Bedong, Kedah (1983–1988) and Kedah Religious High School, Alor Setar, Kedah (1989–1993). He obtained his bachelor's degree in Human Sciences (Political Science) in 2001 and Master's Degree in Humanities (Political Science) in 2003 from International Islamic University of Malaysia (UIAM).

== Early career ==
Shaiful Hazizy started his career as a program assistant at the Policy Studies Institute in 1995. In 1996, he was appointed as the executive manager at the Department of Development of Persons with Disabilities (JPOKU) while in 1997, he was appointed as the Northern Region manager at JPOKU. In 2000, he was appointed as assistant manager at the National Gerakbakti Foundation. In 2001, he was assigned to the Institute of Mind Development (INMIND) as an executive.

In 2003, Shaiful Hazizy was appointed as a special officer to the political secretary at the Ministry of Youth and Sports (KBS) under Hishammuddin Hussein. In 2004 to 2012, he was transferred to the Ministry of Finance (MOF) as a special officer to the political secretary. At the same time, he became a director at the company Papan Agrovalley Sdn Bhd from 2004 to 2012. In 2006, he was appointed as a director at GIA Consult Sdn Bhd while in 2013, he was appointed as executive chairman at SAMA Consultancy Sdn Bhd. He is still the director and executive chairman of both these companies.

== Political career ==
Shaiful Hazizy was elected as the head of the UMNO Youth Movement of Merbok Division in 2008 to 2018. He was also the Working Secretary of the Malaysian UMNO Youth Movement in 2008 to 2011. He was appointed as the head of the UMNO Youth Movement in Kedah State from 2013 to 2018. In 2018, he appointed as deputy head of UMNO Merbok Division. He was appointed by Menteri Besar of Kedah, Datuk Seri Ahmad Bashah Md Hanipah as Political Secretary to YAB Menteri Besar of Kedah in 2016 to 2018. Now, he is the Head of UMNO Merbok Division.

Shaiful Hazizy has been selected by Barisan Nasional as a candidate to contest in the Merbok parliament in the general election on 2022. He lost in a five-cornered match with a majority of 21,019 votes. Perikatan Nasional (PN) candidate, Mohd Nazri Abu Hassan succeeded in wresting the seat from the incumbent, who is also Pakatan Harapan (PH) candidate, Nor Azrina Surip.

Shaiful Hazizy contested in the 2023 UMNO election, but was not appointed as the Member of the UMNO Supreme Working Council because he only managed to win votes from 30 divisions. He was entrusted with the duties as Communication Office of Kedah United Malay National Organization Liaison and Communication Office of Kedah Barisan Nasional Liaison (BN Comms Kedah).

In 2023, Shaiful Hazy was once again nominated as a BN candidate for Tanjong Dawai state assembly in the state election on 2023. This decision was announced by the Secretary-General of UMNO, Asyraf Wajdi Dusuki on July 24, 2023, on his Facebook page. However, he again lost the election to the PN–PAS candidate, Hanif Ghazali. This 2-sided match saw Hanif win a majority of 22,405 votes.

== Personal life ==
Shaiful Hazizy is married to Murni Ali.

== Election results ==
Parliament of Malaysia
Year	Constituency	Candidate	Votes	Pct	Opponent(s)	Votes	Pct	Ballots cast	Majority	Turnout
2022	P014 Merbok	Shaiful Hazizy Zainol Abidin (UMNO)	16,691	16.28%	Mohd Nazri Abu Hassan (BERSATU)	52,573	51.27%	103,799	21,019	80.51%
2022	P014 Merbok	Shaiful Hazizy Zainol Abidin (UMNO)	16,691	16.28%	Nor Azrina Surip (PKR)	31,554	30.77%	103,799	21,019	80.51%
2022	P014 Merbok	Shaiful Hazizy Zainol Abidin (UMNO)	16,691	16.28%	Mohd Mosin Abdul Razak (IMAN)	1,201	1.17%	103,799	21,019	80.51%
2022	P014 Merbok	Shaiful Hazizy Zainol Abidin (UMNO)	16,691	16.28%	Khairul Anuar Ahmad (WARISAN)	525	0.51%	103,799	21,019	80.51%

Kedah State Legislative Assembly
Year	Constituency	Candidate	Votes	Pct	Opponent(s)	Votes	Pct	Ballots cast	Majority	Turnout
2023	N26 Tanjong Dawai	Shaiful Hazizy Zainol Abidin (UMNO)	9,591	23.06%	Hanif Ghazali (PAS)	31,996	76.94%	41,587	22,405	76.77%

== Honours ==
=== Honours in Malaysia ===
- Pahang
  - Knight Companion of the Order of the Crown of Pahang (DIMP) – Dato' (2011)
