= Khir Johari =

Malaysian politician and sports administrator (1923–2006)

Yang Berbahagia Tan Sri Khir Johari PMN DHMS DPMS BCK
- محمد خير جوهري
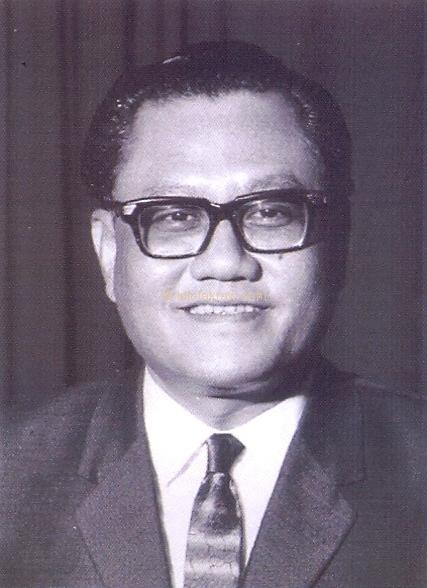

Minister of Education
- In office 1965–1969
- Preceded by: Abdul Rahman Talib
- Succeeded by: Abdul Rahman Ya'kub
- Constituency: Kedah Tengah
- In office 1957–1960
- Preceded by: Abdul Razak Hussein
- Succeeded by: Abdul Rahman Talib
- Constituency: Kedah Tengah

Minister of Agriculture and Co-operatives
- In office 1963–1965
- Preceded by: Abdul Aziz Ishak
- Succeeded by: Mohamed Ghazali Jawi
- Constituency: Kedah Tengah

Minister of Commerce and Industry
- In office 18 November 1959 – 9 October 1962
- Preceded by: Ismail Abdul Rahman
- Succeeded by: Lim Swee Aun
- Constituency: Kedah Tengah

Ambassador of Malaysia to the United States of America
- In office February 1972 – March 1976
- Preceded by: Omar Yoke Lin Ong
- Succeeded by: Zain Azraai Zainal Abidin

Permanent Representative of Malaysia to the United Nations
- In office 1975–1976
- Preceded by: Sardon Jubir
- Succeeded by: Zaiton Ibrahim

Member of the Malaysian Parliament for Kuala Muda
- In office 4 November 1974 – 29 March 1982
- Preceded by: Constituency established
- Succeeded by: Daim Zainuddin (UMNO—BN)
- Majority: 9,518 (1978); Unopposed (1974)

Member of the Malaysian Parliament for Kedah Tengah (Parliament suspended 13 May 1969 – 20 February 1971)
- In office 27 July 1955 – 31 July 1974
- Preceded by: Constituency established
- Succeeded by: Constituency abolished
- Majority: 2,375 (1969); 10,680 (1964); 6,836 (1959); 29,646 (1955)

Personal details
- Born: Khir Johari; 29 January 1923 Alor Setar, Kedah, Unfederated Malay States, British Malaya (now Malaysia)
- Died: 19 November 2006 (aged 83) Kuala Lumpur, Malaysia
- Resting place: Makam Pahlawan, Masjid Negara, Kuala Lumpur
- Party: United Malays National Organisation (UMNO)
- Other political affiliations: Barisan Nasional (BN)
- Spouses: Puan Sri Kalsom Abdul Rahman (deceased); Puan Sri Dato' Hajah Khir Johari
- Children: Zairil Khir Johari (son); Yusri Khir Johari (son)
- Education: Sultan Abdul Hamid College
- Occupation: Politician, diplomat

Khir Johari (Jawi: محمد خير بن جوهري; 29 January 1923 – 19 November 2006) was a Malaysian politician and a former Malaysian Minister of Education.

Born on 29 January 1923, in Alor Setar, Khir Johari received formal education at the prestigious Sultan Abdul Hamid College (KSAH) in Kedah. Khir Johari was a Member of Parliament from 1955 to 1982. He was involved in the Malaysian political scene from its inception and served in the Cabinet of Tunku Abdul Rahman and Tun Abdul Razak.

Upon his retirement he held positions in several organisations, most famously as President of the World Wide Fund for Nature of Malaysia (WWF).

Khir Johari died of heart failure at 83 on 19 November 2006. He was accorded a state funeral and was buried in Makam Pahlawan near Masjid Negara, Kuala Lumpur.

== Early life and education ==
Khir Johari was born on 29 January 1923, in Alor Setar, Kedah. He received formal education in the Sultan Abdul Hamid College (KSAH) in Kedah. His desire to continue studying at Medical College, Raffles College in Singapore in 1940 was thwarted when the Second World War (PDII) broke out.

== Early career ==
After the war, Khir Johari returned to his alma mater Sultan Abdul Hamid College as a teacher, where he taught English. During this time, he was politically active through his involvement with the Malay nationalist organisation SABERKAS (Sayang Akan Bangsa Ertinya Redha Korban Apa Segala).

After Tunku Abdul Rahman took over from Dato' Sir Onn Jaafar as president of UMNO, Khir Johari was appointed as Secretary-General of UMNO and was tasked to oversee the first federal election in Malaya in 1955. After winning the constituency of Kedah Tengah, Khir Johari was appointed into the Cabinet as Assistant Minister of Agriculture.

== Government Service ==
Upon Independence, Khir Johari was appointed into the first Cabinet of independent Malaya as the Minister of Education. He held on to this post until 1960, when he was transferred to the Ministry of Trade and Commerce.

In 1964, Khir Johari was made Minister of Agriculture, replacing Abdul Aziz Ishak, who had been relieved of his position and later detained under the Internal Security Act.

In 1966, Khir Johari returned to helm the Ministry of Education until 1969. Following the 13 May riots, Khir Johari was appointed Minister of Trade and Industry as key Tunku allies were sidelined. This allowed the government to implement Malay nationalist policies in education, including the abolishment of English-medium education at primary, secondary and tertiary levels.

In February 1973, Khir Johari was appointed the Malaysian Ambassador to the United States of America, and later concurrently the Permanent Representative to the United Nations. He served as a diplomat until 1976.

In 1978, Khir Johari contested his last general election, and retired from active politics at the end of the term in 1982.

== Civil Society ==
During and after his career in politics, Khir Johari was active in various civil society organisations, including as president of the Malaysian Institute of Directors, president of the World Wide Fund for Nature of Malaysia (WWF), president of the Malaysian Zoological Society, president of the Royal Commonwealth Society and president of the Royal Selangor Club among others.

Khir Johari was also the Charter President of Kiwanis Club of Kuala Lumpur and was later awarded the title of 'Bapa Kiwanis'. He was also the founding chairman of the Malaysian Toray Science Foundation, as well as the Tunku Abdul Rahman Foundation.

Khir Johari took an active interest in sports, serving as deputy president of the Olympic Council of Malaysia from 1982 to 2002. He was also famously the president of the Badminton Association of Malaysia from 1961 to 1985, during which the Malaysian team managed to win the prestigious Thomas Cup in 1967.

Khir Johari was also the founding president of the Sepak Takraw Association of Malaysia, president of the Malaysian Body Building Federation and president of the Lawn Tennis Association of Malaysia.

== Awards and honours ==
In appreciation of his services and contributions, Khir Johari was awarded an honorary Doctorate in Law by the University of Malaya in 1968, an honorary Doctorate in Education and Science by the De La Salle College, Manila in 1967, the Senatorship by the Junior Chamber International in 1967, the 'Langkawi Award' – the highest tribute for an individual Malaysian for outstanding contributions in the field of environment in 1995 and the 'WWF Member of Honour' award by the World President of the WWF for outstanding service to the environment in 1999.

He was also the recipient of the Tokoh Sukan Award in 1998, International Olympic Council Merit Award in 1998 for the development of sports, the President's Award by the Malaysia American Society in 1999, the PATA Roll of Honor in 2001, the OCM Hall of Fame in 2002, the Paul Harris Fellow by the Rotary Foundation of Rotary International, the Tablet of Honor by the Kiwanis International Foundation in 2003, the United Nations Malaysia Award in 2004, and the first recipient of the Golden Years Award by the AUTORR Foundation in 2005.

He was bestowed the award of the Panglima Mangku Negara (P.M.N.) which carries the title of Tan Sri, the Seri Paduka Seri Setia Sultan Abdul Halim Muadzam Shah (D.H.M.S.) which carries the title of Dato' Paduka and the Dato' Paduka Mahkota Selangor (D.P.M.S.) in 1992.

== Election results ==
Federal Legislative Council
Year	Constituency	Candidate	Votes	Pct	Opponent(s)	Votes	Pct	Ballots cast	Majority	Turnout
1955	Kedah Tengah	Khir Johari (UMNO)	31,077	95.60%	Puteh Napa (NEGARA)	1,431	4.40%	33,050	29,646	88.90%

Parliament of the Federation of Malaya
Year	Constituency	Candidate	Votes	Pct	Opponent(s)	Votes	Pct	Ballots cast	Majority	Turnout
1959	P009 Kedah Tengah	Khir Johari (UMNO)	11,271	66.53%	Hussain Che Dol (PMIP)	4,435	26.18%	17,163	6,836	75.40%
1959	P009 Kedah Tengah	Khir Johari (UMNO)	11,271	66.53%	Mohamed Shariff Babul (PRM)	1,234	7.28%	17,163	6,836	75.40%

Parliament of Malaysia
Year	Constituency	Candidate	Votes	Pct	Opponent(s)	Votes	Pct	Ballots cast	Majority	Turnout
1964	P009 Kedah Tengah	Khir Johari (UMNO)	16,042	74.95%	Hussain Che Dol (PMIP)	5,362	25.05%	22,289	10,680	74.72%
1969	P009 Kedah Tengah	Khir Johari (UMNO)	13,958	54.65%	Ahmad Othman (PMIP)	11,583	45.35%	26,677	2,375	75.57%
1974	P012 Kuala Muda	Khir Johari (UMNO)	Unopposed							
1978	P012 Kuala Muda	Khir Johari (UMNO)	17,761	68.30%	Ghazali Din (PAS)	8,243	31.70%	26,817	9,518	78.06%

== Honours ==
=== Honours of Malaysia ===
- Malaysia
  - Commander of the Order of the Defender of the Realm (PMN) – Tan Sri (1986)
  - Recipient of the Malaysian Commemorative Medal (Gold) (PPM) (1965)
- Kedah
  - Knight Commander of the Order of Loyalty to Sultan Abdul Halim Mu'adzam Shah (DHMS) – Dato' Paduka (1997)
  - State of Kedah Distinguished Service Star (BCK) (1959)
- Selangor
  - Knight Commander of the Order of the Crown of Selangor (DPMS) – Dato' (1992)

=== Foreign honours ===
- Cambodia
  - Grand Officer of the Royal Order of Sahametrei (1962)
- Japan
  - Gold and Silver Star of the Order of the Rising Sun (1964)

== Places named after him ==
- Sekolah Kebangsaan Khir Johari, national primary schools in Sungai Petani in Kedah, Perai in Penang, Johor Bahru in Johor, Sungai Sumun in Perak, and Sabak Bernam in Selangor.
- Sekolah Menengah Kebangsaan Khir Johari, a national secondary schools in Sungai Petani in Kedah, Beranang in Selangor, and Tanjung Malim in Perak.
