= Kolej Sultan Abdul Hamid =

College in Alor Setar, Kedah, Malaysia

Sultan Abdul Hamid College
- Kolej Sultan Abdul Hamid

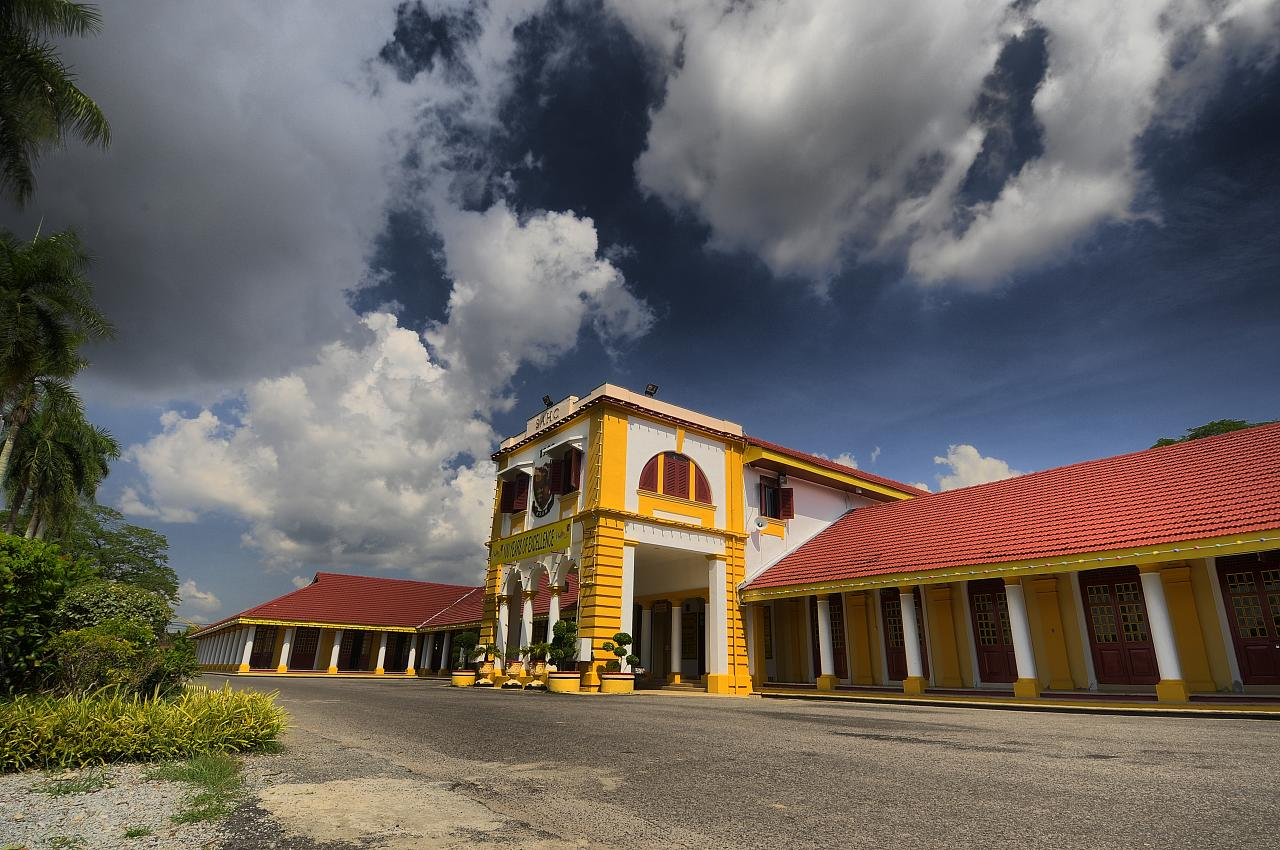

Location
- Jalan Langgar, 05460 Alor Setar, Alor Setar, Kedah; Malaysia

Information
- Type: Secondary School (Intelligent-Cluster School)(Premier School) (Elite School)
- Motto: Scholar, Sportsman, Gentleman
- Established: 8 December 1908
- School district: Kota Setar
- Principal: En. Rosli bin Endut
- Grades: Form 1 - Upper 6
- Enrolment: 789 students
- Language: Malay, English
- Colours: Red, yellow, black
- Alumni: SAHOCA (Sultan Abdul Hamid Old Collegians Association)
- Website: sahc.edu.my

Kolej Sultan Abdul Hamid (English: Sultan Abdul Hamid College; abbreviated SAHC; also known as Maktab Sultan Abdul Hamid) located in Alor Setar, Kedah, is one of Malaysia's oldest and most prestigious schools. Founded in 1908 as Government English School (G.E.S.), it is also one of the country's oldest English-medium schools. The students of Kolej, are mostly boys as Forms 1 to 5 are for boys only, and the Lower and Upper Sixth Forms are co-educational.

There were only 50 students back in the year 1908 and by 2007 more than 1200 students were enrolled. The school is fondly known as "Kolej" to the people of Alor Setar and also Kedah as a whole. Students of this school are proudly known as "Collegians". The school's yearly magazine, Darulaman ("the abode of peace"), takes its name from the state of Kedah's honorific title. The school celebrated its 100 years in existence in the year 2008 and the Sultan Abdul Hamid Old Collegians' Association(SAHOCA) has built a new hall, the Dewan Centennial Sultan Abdul Halim in the school to commemorate the 100 year celebrations. The hall was officiated on May 18, 2016 and is named after the 5th and 14th Seri Paduka Baginda Yang Di-Pertuan Agong of Malaysia (Supreme King of Malaysia), who was also Sultan of the state of Kedah, Sultan Abdul Halim Mu'adzam Shah Ibni Almarhum Sultan Badlishah who was also named the "Collegian of the Century" during the school's 100 year celebrations in 2008.

== History ==
=== The First School ===
In 1908, before Kedah came under British protection, the state's government appointed Mohamad bin Iskandar, a senior teacher at the Penang Free School and the father of Mahathir Mohamad (fourth Prime Minister of Malaysia), as the first headmaster of the "Government English School" (GES), which was the state's first English school.

The school was housed in a wooden building between the Alor Setar High Court building (now known as Galeria Sultan Abdul Halim) and the Balai Nobat facing the junction of Jalan Baru (now known as Jalan Putera). The small building, which could accommodate no more than 50 pupils, had previously been the office of Chief Minister Wan Md Saman, who was instrumental in the construction of the Wan Md. Saman canal.

In 1910, Mohamad bin Iskandar resigned and returned to the Penang Free School leaving the G.E.S. in the hands of Md. Salleh. Ismail Merican, another Senior Assistant Master at the Penang Free School, was appointed Headmaster the following year. The student body had grown to 97, more than the building could accommodate, so some classes had to be held in the open air.

=== The Second School ===
In 1911 the school moved to a private house in Jalan Penjara Lama. Here also the accommodation was insufficient for the number of pupils, who occupied cubicles in the small, dark rooms, with many seated on the floor.

By 1912 there were 160 boys enrolled. The school expanded its teaching staff, and now taught up to Standard Four. The shortages of accommodation and trained staff made teaching to a higher standard impossible, so that when pupils had attained Standard Four they enrolled in either the Penang Free School or the Malay College, or sought employment. The majority preferred to work since they could find good jobs with a Standard Four qualification.

=== The Present Building ===
For the site of the present building, Che Md. Ariffin (Secretary to the Government), and Che Ismail Merican (Headmaster of the school) selected an area of about 30 acres (120,000 m^{2}) at Tanjung Bendahara. Construction, which began in 1915, was completed in late 1916.

The building consisted of a two-storied structure in the centre with two classrooms on each side. Provision was made for future expansion, allowing adequate space for playing fields and more classrooms to accommodate over a thousand pupils.

The school was formally declared open on January 1, 1917, and E.A.G. Stuart, who was the headmaster and also Superintendent of Education, had his office in the central building. By 1917 there were 223 on the roll with a staff of eleven including the Headmaster. There were trained teachers, and Stuart trained the others himself, as teacher training had not yet started in Kedah.

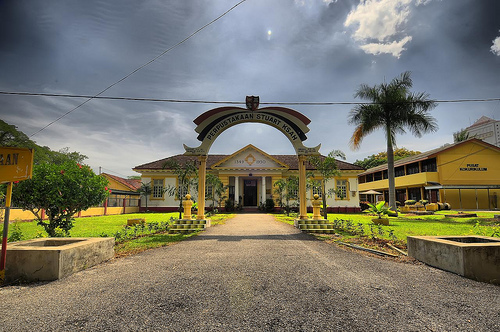
The Stuart Library, Est. 1930

Stuart had the task of running two rapidly growing establishments at the same time. By 1923 he was finding it difficult to cope alone, so E.C. Hicks was appointed as his assistant. By 1926 over 400 pupils were enrolled, and the government appointed a committee to make recommendations for future English education in the state. This committee members were Stuart, S. Dennys, E.A.P. Helps, Tunku Mohamed and Tuan Syed Mohamed Idid. They recommended, among other things, that English education should be provided to 800 boys, of whom 640 should be Malays.

Stuart relinquished his post as Headmaster to devote all his time to the Education Office, which occupied the top floor of the Post Office from 1926 until 1935. Hicks took over as Headmaster in late 1926. Stuart died the next year at Pulau Tikus Sanatorium, Penang, and soon afterward the college built a library and named it after him.

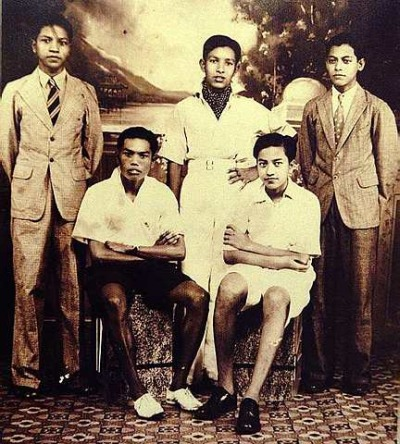
The Literary and Debating Society of Sultan Abdul Hamid College in 1940. Seated from left: Ahmad Nordin, Khir Johari, Tiddemand, Mahathir Mohamad, Zulkifli Hashim.

=== Co-education ===
Since its early days, the college had allowed co-education. After World War II, more girls were admitted, and in 1953 the Darulaman Magazine commented: "Owing to the shortage of teachers and the small number of students in Kampong Baru Girls' School (KBGS), co-education has been introduced into the Sultan Abdul Hamid College (SAHC) in 1948. KBGS sent only students of Standard Seven. They were Kalsom and Swee Eng, but towards the end of the year Che Zaidah joined them."

In 1949, four Malay girls enrolled, among them Tunku Sakinah, the daughter of the Sultan of Kedah. In 1950, 11 enrolled. In 1951 the intake dropped because the headmistress of KBGS sent only those she considered the best. By the beginning of 1952 only eight girls were left. In 1953 the figure rose again to 19, making a total of 24 girls in Standard Seven. In 1954 the college started Sixth Form tuition and three more girls enrolled.

In 1991, Prime Minister Mahathir Mohamad pledged $2 million to support the restoration and renovation of the college buildings.

== Notable alumni ==
The Sultan Abdul Hamid Old Collegians Association (SAHOCA) is headquartered in Wisma SAHOCA, Kelana Jaya, Selangor.

=== Royalty ===
- Sultan Abdul Halim, the 28th Sultan of Kedah and 5th and 14th Agong of Malaysia
- Sultan Sallehuddin, the 29th Sultan of Kedah
- Tunku Abdul Malik, former Raja Muda of Kedah and the Regent of Kedah from 1970 -1975

=== Military ===
- Abdul Razak Mohd Yusof, recipient of Seri Pahlawan Gagah Perkasa
- Tunku Osman Tunku Mohammad Jewa, first Malaysian Armed Forces Chief of Staff

=== Politics ===
- Tunku Abdul Rahman, 1st Malaysian Prime Minister
- Mahathir Mohamad, the 4th and 7th Malaysian Prime Minister
- Khir Johari, former Minister of Education
- Daim Zainuddin, former Minister of Finance
- Chor Chee Heung, former Local Government & Housing Minister
- Othman Aziz, former Deputy Finance Minister
- Mohamed Zahir Ismail, former Speaker of the Dewan Rakyat
- Ramli Mohd Nor, Deputy Speaker of the Dewan Rakyat
- Chandra Muzaffar, former deputy president of Parti Keadilan Nasional

=== Law ===
- Syed Sheh Hassan Barakbah, the third Yang di-Pertua Negeri of Penang, the 2nd Lord President of the Supreme Court & former President of the Dewan Negara
- Abdul Hamid Omar, the first Chief Justice of Malaysia
- Mohamed Dzaiddin Abdullah, the third Chief Justice of Malaysia
- Ahmad Fairuz Abdul Halim, the 4th Chief Justice of Malaysia
- Zaki Azmi, the 6th Chief Justice of Malaysia
- Idrus Harun, the 11th Attorney General of Malaysia

=== Civil Service & Diplomacy ===
- Abdul Halim Ali, the 10th Chief Secretary to the Government
- Razali Ismail, former President of the United Nations General Assembly

=== Arts ===
- Shahnon Ahmad, Malaysian national laureate
- Bront Palarae, Actor, Screenwriter, Film Director and Producer

=== Sports ===
- Akmal Rizal Ahmad Rakhli, former national and Kedah football player current Head Coach of Penang F.C.
- Azhar Mansor, first Malaysian to sail solo around the world
- Khamal Idris Ali, former national and Kedah football player, current CEO of Kedah Darulaman F.C.
- Victor Andrag, former national and Kedah football player, current Assistant Head Coach of Kedah Darul Aman F.C.
- Tan Cheng Hoe, former national and Kedah football player, former national team head coach

=== Medicine ===
- Salma Ismail, first Malay female doctor
