= Rashid Din =

Malaysian politician

Yang Berbahagia Dato' Rashid Din DIMP DSDK
- رشيد دين

Member of the Malaysian Parliament for Merbok
- In office 8 March 2008 – 5 May 2013
- Preceded by: Zainuddin Maidin (BN–UMNO)
- Succeeded by: Ismail Daut (BN–UMNO)
- Majority: 3,098 (2008)

Personal details
- Born: 29 July 1946 (age 79) Penang, Malayan Union (now Malaysia)
- Party: People's Justice Party (PKR)
- Other political affiliations: Pakatan Rakyat (PR) (2008–2015); Pakatan Harapan (PH) (2015–present)
- Occupation: Politician

Rashid bin Din (born 29 July 1946) was the Member of the Parliament (MP) for the Merbok from March 2008 to May 2013. He sat in Parliament as a member of the People's Justice Party (PKR) in the opposition Pakatan Rakyat coalition.

Rashid won the seat of Merbok in the 2008 election. The seat, previously held comfortably by the Barisan Nasional coalition, swung to the PKR for Rashid to win it by 3,098 votes. Rashid was replaced as the PKR's candidate for the seat at the 2013 election, and the party lost the seat to the Barisan Nasional's Ismail Daut.

== Election results ==
Parliament of Malaysia
| Year | Constituency | Candidate | Votes | Pct | Opponent(s) | Votes | Pct | Ballots cast | Majority | Turnout |
|---|---|---|---|---|---|---|---|---|---|---|
| 2008 | P014 Merbok | Rashid Din (PKR) | 25,541 | 53.23% | Tajul Urus Mat Zain (UMNO) | 22,443 | 46.77% | 49,718 | 3,098 | 77.15% |

== Honours ==
In January 2010, Rashid was conferred the honorific title of Datuk by Sultan Abdul Halim of Kedah.

- Kedah
  - Knight Companion of the Order of Loyalty to the Royal House of Kedah (DSDK) – Dato' (2010)
  - Companion of the Order of the Crown of Kedah (SMK)
- Pahang
  - Knight Companion of the Order of the Crown of Pahang (DIMP) – Dato' (2002)
