= Zainuddin Maidin =

Malaysian politician (1939–2018)

Yang Berbahagia Tan Sri Datuk Seri Zainuddin Maidin PSM PJN DGSM DPMS DPMK JMN SMS AMK AMP
- زين الدين بن ميدين

Minister of Information
- In office 14 February 2006 – 8 March 2008
- Preceded by: Abdul Kadir Sheikh Fadzir
- Succeeded by: Ahmad Shabery Cheek
- Constituency: Merbok

Member of the Malaysian Parliament for Merbok
- In office 21 March 2004 – 8 March 2008
- Preceded by: Daim Zainuddin
- Succeeded by: Rashid Din
- Majority: 15,445 (2004)

Personal details
- Born: Zainuddin bin Maidin; 26 June 1939 Kota Kuala Muda, Kedah, British Malaya (now Malaysia)
- Died: 14 December 2018 (aged 79) Serdang Hospital, Kajang, Selangor, Malaysia
- Resting place: Kampung Klang Gate/Taman Melawati Muslim Cemetery, Kuala Lumpur, Malaysia
- Citizenship: Malaysian
- Party: UMNO of Barisan Nasional (BN) (until 2018); Independent (2018); Pakatan Harapan (2018)
- Spouse: Zaiton Zainol Abidin
- Children: 4
- Education: University of Michigan
- Occupation: Journalist
- Website: zamkata.blogspot.com

Zainuddin bin Maidin (Jawi: زين الدين بن ميدين; 26 June 1939 – 14 December 2018) was a Malaysian politician and the former Information Minister in the Malaysian cabinet representing United Malays National Organisation (UMNO) in the Barisan Nasional (BN) coalition government. He was the member of the Parliament of Malaysia for the Merbok constituency for one term, from 24 March 2004 to 8 March 2008. In 2018, he quit UMNO and joined Pakatan Harapan (PH) coalition government. He was also the former Chief Editor of Utusan Melayu-turned-fierce critic, the oldest Malay language newspaper in Malaysia.

== Early life ==
Zainuddin bin Maidin, was born in Kota Kuala Muda, Kedah, to a Muslim family of mixed Malay and Indian descent. He received his early education in Maktab Mahmud, Alor Star.

He later obtained his diploma in journalism from the Berlin Journalism Institute in 1969. In 1981, he was awarded with the Professional Journalist Fellowship from the University of Michigan, US.

Zainuddin is married to Datin Zaiton Zainol Abidin and is a father to two daughters and two sons.

== Career ==
=== Authorship ===
He wrote a few books, and among the most notable ones are Yang Pertama dan Terakhir, Malaysia-British Relations in London, Mahathir Di Sebalik Tabir, and Tun Razak: Jejak Bertapak Seorang Patriot.

== Politics ==
Zainuddin was appointed as a member of the Dewan Negara in 1998, before being named the Parliamentary Secretary of the Information Ministry on 17 January 2001. He was sworn as a member of the Dewan Negara for a second term in February 2001 and was appointed Deputy Information Minister on 21 November 2002 by Prime Minister Mahathir Mohamad.

Later, he won the Merbok Parliamentary seat in the 2004 Malaysian general elections by beating a Parti Keadilan Rakyat (PKR) candidate, Saiful Izham Ramli with a 15,445 majority.

On 14 February 2006, he was made the Information Minister by then Prime Minister Tun Abdullah Ahmad Badawi, replacing Datuk Paduka Abdul Kadir Sheikh Fadzir.

In the 2008 Malaysian general elections on 8 March 2008, he contested the Sungai Petani parliamentary seat but was defeated by Datuk Johari Abdul from PKR.

== Controversy ==
In 2006, the opposition Democratic Action Party (DAP), which had been a vocal opponent of the Sedition Act and the Internal Security Act (ISA), filed a police report against UMNO, whose annual general assembly had been noted for its heated rhetoric, with delegates making statements such as "Umno is willing to risk lives and bathe in blood to defend the race and religion. Don't play with fire. If they (non-Malays) messed with our rights, we will mess with theirs." In response, the Information Minister said that this indicated that the Sedition Act continued to remain relevant to Malaysian society. He also denied that the government intentionally used the act to silence dissent or to advance particular political interests.

He gained notoriety in Malaysian politics for demonstrating a poor command of the English language during a telephone interview with Al Jazeera on the first Bersih rally in 2007.

In December 2012 Zainuddin caused a minor diplomatic incident with Indonesia after writing an article highly critical of former President B J Habibie, which was published by Utusan Malaysia. President Susilo Bambang Yudhoyono conveyed his discomfort with the article to Malaysian Prime Minister Najib Razak.

In August 2013, Zainuddin was forced to apologise after AirAsia sent a letter of demand in response to a libellous article in his blog, in which he alleged that the prominent low-cost carrier served pork on its flights (pork is taboo food in Muslim-majority Malaysia). AirAsia had called for Zainuddin to post an apology for six months in the said blog, but Zainuddin stated that the apology would be published indefinitely.

In July 2018, Zainuddin who by this time was pro-Pakatan Harapan, leaning towards DAP and PKR, and fierce critic of UMNO and Utusan Melayu, urged PH's Minister Mujahid Yusof Rawa to close down all Tahfiz school in Malaysia, ban Arab culture, Arabic and Jawi calligraphies, scripts and sayings. This caused uproar in Malaysia from UMNO, PAS politicians and all Muslim NGOs.

== Election results ==
Parliament of Malaysia
Year	Constituency	Candidate	Votes	Pct	Opponent(s)	Votes	Pct	Ballots cast	Majority	Turnout
2004	P014 Merbok	Zainuddin Maidin (UMNO)	29,607	67.64%	Saiful Izham Ramli (PKR)	14,162	32.36%	44,981	15,445	77.66%
2008	P015 Sungai Petani	Zainuddin Maidin (UMNO)	24,441	41.95%	Johari Abdul (PKR)	33,822	58.05%	59,378	9,381	77.84%

== Awards and recognition ==
- Malaysia
  - Companion of the Order of the Defender of the Realm (JMN) (1990)
  - Commander of the Order of Meritorious Service (PJN) – Datuk (1996)
  - Commander of the Order of Loyalty to the Crown of Malaysia (PSM) – Tan Sri (2009)
- Pahang
  - Member of the Order of the Crown of Pahang (AMP) (1982)
- Kedah
  - Member of the Order of the Crown of Kedah (AMK) (1987)
  - Knight Commander of the Order of the Crown of Kedah (DPMK) – Dato' (2006)
- Selangor
  - Companion of the Order of the Crown of Selangor (SMS) (1990)
  - Knight Commander of the Order of the Crown of Selangor (DPMS) – Dato' (2003)
- Malacca
  - Grand Commander of the Exalted Order of Malacca (DGSM) – Datuk Seri (2006)

== Death ==
Zainuddin died of cardiac arrest (heart attack) on 14 December 2018 (Friday) at 6.20 pm at the Serdang Hospital at age 79. His remains was brought to his residence at Precinct 10 in Putrajaya before funeral prayers at Surau At Tarbiah in Taman Melawati and then burial at Kampung Klang Gates/Taman Melawati Muslim Cemetery in Hulu Klang, Kuala Lumpur the next morning. His funeral was attended by hundreds of family members, relatives, friends and prominent figures including Prime Minister Mahathir Mohamad.
