= Kuala Muda (federal constituency) =

Federal constitution in Malaysia

Kedah constituency

Defunct federal constituency
- Legislature: Dewan Rakyat
- Constituency created: 1974
- Constituency abolished: 1986
- First contested: 1974
- Last contested: 1982

Kuala Muda was a federal constituency in Kedah, Malaysia, that was represented in the Dewan Rakyat from 1974 to 1986.

The federal constituency was created in the 1974 redistribution and was mandated to return a single member to the Dewan Rakyat under the first past the post voting system.

== History ==
It was abolished in 1986 when it was redistributed.

=== Representation history ===
Members of Parliament for Kuala Muda
Parliament	No	Years	Member	Party	Vote Share
Constituency created from Jerai, Kedah Tengah and Sungei Patani
4th	P012	1974–1978	Mohamed Khir Johari (محمد خير جوهري)	BN (UMNO)	Uncontested
5th	P012	1978–1982	Mohamed Khir Johari (محمد خير جوهري)	BN (UMNO)	17,761; 68.30%
6th	P012	1982–1986	Abdul Daim Zainuddin (دائم زين الدين)	BN (UMNO)	21,782; 73.82%
Constituency abolished, split into Jerai and Merbok

=== State constituency ===
Parliamentary constituency	State constituency						
Parliamentary constituency	1955–1959*	1959–1974	1974–1986	1986–1995	1995–2004	2004–2018	2018–present
Kuala Muda			Jeniang				
Kuala Muda			Merbok				

=== Historical boundaries ===
State Constiteuncy	Area
State Constiteuncy	1974
Jeniang	Bandar Laguna Merbok; Jeniang; Kampung Batu Lima; Kuala Sin; Sungai Lalang
Merbok	Bedong; Bujang; Kampung Bukit Tukang Jusoh; Semeling; Tanjung Dawai

== Election results ==
Malaysian general election, 1982
Party	Candidate	Votes	%	∆%
BN	Abdul Daim Zainuddin	21,782	73.82	▲5.52
PAS	Ghazali Din	7,724	26.18	▼5.52
Total valid votes		29,506	100.00	
Total rejected ballots		1,064		
Unreturned ballots		0		
Turnout		30,570	76.79	▼1.27
Registered electors		39,810		
Majority		14,058	47.64	▲11.04
BN hold		Swing		

Malaysian general election, 1978
Party	Candidate	Votes	%	∆%
BN	Mohamed Khir Johari	17,761	68.30	▲68.30
PAS	Ghazali Din	8,243	31.70	▲31.70
Total valid votes		26,004	100.00	
Total rejected ballots		813		
Unreturned ballots		0		
Turnout		26,817	78.06	
Registered electors		34,354		
Majority		9,518	36.60	
BN hold		Swing		

Malaysian general election, 1974
Party	Candidate	Votes	%	∆%
On the nomination day, Mohamed Khir Johari won uncontested.
BN	Mohamed Khir Johari			
Total valid votes			100.00	
Total rejected ballots				
Unreturned ballots				
Turnout				
Registered electors		29,599		
Majority				
This was a new constituency created.
