= 1959 Kedah Tengah by-election =

Parliamentary by-election in Malaysia

- 30 September 1959

P009 Kedah Tengah seat in the Dewan Rakyat
- Turnout: 75.40%
	First party	Second party	Third party
	All	PMIP	SF
Candidate	Khir Johari	Hussain Che Dol	Mohamed Shariff Babul
Party	UMNO	PMIP	PRM
Alliance	Alliance		SF
Popular vote	11,271	4,435	1,234
Percentage	66.53%	26.18%	7.28%
MP before election
Khir Johari
Alliance (UMNO)
Elected MP
Khir Johari
Alliance (UMNO)

The Kedah Tengah by-election is a parliamentary by-election that was held on 30 September 1959 in the state of Kedah in the Federation of Malaya. The Kedah Tengah seat was the only remaining constituency where elections have not been completed in the 1959 Malayan general election. Khir Johari of Alliance won the seat in 1955 Malayan general election with 29,646 majority.

The election was postponed due to disqualification of PMIP candidate Mansur Ishak two days before 19 August polling day. Mansur Ishak have been admitted to hospital roughly two weeks prior polling day but no reason were provided by Election Commission.

Khir Johari of Alliance, defended the seat, defeating Mohamed Shariff Babul of SF and Hussain Che Dol of PMIP with a reduced majority of 6,836 votes. The constituency had 22,762 voters.

== Nomination ==
Nomination day was fixed at 8 September 1959 while polling day was set on 30 September 1959.

Prior nomination day, PMIP consider three names to fight Khir Johari. Those were chairman of party state election committee, Ahmad Shukri, former teacher, Mohammed Noor and Abu Bakar Hamzah, defeated candidate for Perlis Utara during 19 August polling day.

On nomination day, Alliance renominated incumbent MP and Minister of Education, Khir Johari. SF nominated state publicity chief, Mohamed Shariff Babul while PMIP nominated former Alliance state councilor and their Kedah publicity chief, Hussain Che Dol.

== Results ==
Malaysian general by-election, 30 September 1959: Kedah Tengah
Party	Candidate	Votes	%	∆%
Khir was elected to Parliament in the Kedah Tengah by-election, 1959. Kedah Tengah is the only remaining constituency where elections have not been completed in the Malayan general election, 1959.
Alliance	Mohamed Khir Johari	11,271	66.53	▼29.03
PMIP	Hussain Che Dol	4,435	26.18	▲26.18
Socialist Front	Mohamed Shariff Babul	1,234	7.28	▲7.28
Total valid votes		16,940	100.00	
Total rejected ballots		223		
Unreturned ballots		0		
Turnout		17,163	75.40	▼4.40
Registered electors		22,762		
Majority		6,836	43.35	▼47.81
Alliance hold		Swing		
