= Ismail Daut =

Malaysian politician and lecturer (1956–2022)

Ismail Daut SDK
- إسماعيل داود

Member of the Malaysian Parliament for Merbok
- In office 5 May 2013 – 9 May 2018
- Preceded by: Rashid Din (PR–PKR)
- Succeeded by: Nor Azrina Surip (PH–PKR)
- Majority: 4,122 (2013)

Personal details
- Born: Ismail bin Daut; 12 April 1956 Sungai Petani, Kedah, Federation of Malaya (now Malaysia)
- Died: 4 June 2022 (aged 66) Sungai Petani, Kedah, Malaysia
- Citizenship: Malaysian
- Party: United Malays National Organisation (UMNO)
- Other political affiliations: Barisan Nasional (BN)
- Occupation: Politician
- Profession: Lecturer

Ismail bin Daut (12 April 1956 – 4 June 2022) was a Malaysian politician and lecturer who served as the Member of Parliament (MP) for Merbok from May 2013 to May 2018. He was a member of the United Malays National Organisation (UMNO), a component party of the Barisan Nasional (BN) coalition.

A lecturer by profession, Ismail entered Parliament at the 2013 general election. The seat had been held by Rashid Din of the opposition People's Justice Party (PKR), although PKR's candidate for the 2013 election was Nor Azrina Surip. Ismail defeated her by 4,122 votes, returning the seat to the Barisan Nasional. The Election Court dismissed a petition filed by Nor Azrina challenging the result.

Ismail did not contest to defend his Merbok parliamentary seat in the 2018 general election.

== Death ==
Ismail Daut accidentally fell down at his home and died.

== Election results ==
Parliament of Malaysia
Year	Constituency	Candidate	Votes	Pct	Opponent(s)	Votes	Pct	Ballots cast	Majority	Turnout
2013	P014 Merbok	Ismail Daut (UMNO)	38,538	52.83%	Nor Azrina Surip (PKR)	34,416	47.17%	74,520	4,122	86.74%

== Honours ==
- Kedah
  - Companion of the Order of Loyalty to the Royal House of Kedah (SDK) (2017)
