= Daim Zainuddin =

Malaysian politician (1938–2024)

Yang Amat Berbahagia Tun Dr. Daim Zainuddin SSM SPMS SSAP DHMS DGSM
- دائم زين الدين

Minister of Finance
- In office 7 January 1999 – 31 May 2001
- Monarchs: Ja'afar; Salahuddin
- Prime Minister: Mahathir Mohamad
- Deputy: Wong See Wah (1999); Mohamed Nazri Abdul Aziz (1999); Shafie Salleh (1999–2001); Chan Kong Choy (1999–2001)
- Preceded by: Mahathir Mohamad
- Succeeded by: Mahathir Mohamad
- Constituency: Merbok
- In office 14 July 1984 – 15 March 1991
- Monarchs: Iskandar; Azlan Shah
- Prime Minister: Mahathir Mohamad
- Deputy: Sabbaruddin Chik; Oo Gin Sun; Ng Cheng Kiat; Wan Abu Bakar Wan Mohamad; Loke Yuen Yow; Abdul Ghani Othman (1990–1991)
- Preceded by: Tengku Razaleigh Hamzah
- Succeeded by: Anwar Ibrahim
- Constituency: Merbok

Member of the Malaysian Parliament for Merbok
- In office 2/3 August 1986 – 21 March 2004
- Preceded by: New constituency
- Succeeded by: Zainuddin Maidin (BN–UMNO)
- Majority: 13,745 (1986); 15,843 (1990); 22,201 (1995); 15,376 (1999)

Member of the Malaysian Parliament for Kuala Muda
- In office 1982–1986
- Preceded by: Khir Johari (BN–UMNO)
- Succeeded by: Constituency abolished
- Majority: 14,058 (1982)

Personal details
- Born: Che Abdul Daim bin Zainuddin; 29 April 1938 Alor Setar, Kedah, Unfederated Malay States, British Malaya (now Malaysia)
- Died: 13 November 2024 (aged 86) Petaling Jaya, Selangor, Malaysia
- Resting place: Bukit Kiara Muslim Cemetery, Damansara, Kuala Lumpur
- Citizenship: Malaysia
- Party: United Malays National Organisation (UMNO) (until 2018); Malaysian United Indigenous Party (BERSATU) (2018–2020); Independent (2020–2024)
- Other political affiliations: Barisan Nasional (BN) (until 2018); Pakatan Harapan (PH) (2018–2020)
- Spouse(s): Mahani Idris (died 2023); Naimah Khalid
- Children: 5
- Education: Lincoln's Inn; University of California, Berkeley; University of Malaya
- Occupation: Politician, Businessman
- Website: daimzainuddin.com

Che Abdul Daim bin Zainuddin (Jawi: چئ عبدالدائم بن زين الدين; 29 April 1938 – 13 November 2024) was a Malaysian politician and businessman who served as the Minister of Finance from 1984 to 1991 and again from 1999 to 2001, both times under Prime Minister Mahathir Mohamad. He also served as a Senator from 1980 to 1982 and as a Member of Parliament (MP) from 1982 to 2004.

Daim is credited with steering Malaysia through the 1997 Asian financial crisis and was a major architect of Malaysia’s economic strategy and development.

Though not listed in any indexes, Daim was known as one of Malaysia's wealthiest individuals. Daim and his wife were charged in January 2024 with failing to declare 71 assets as part of an anti-corruption probe that he described as politically motivated. Daim was acquitted of graft after prosecutors applied to withdraw all charges following his death. However, posthumous investigations into his assets as well as his family has continued.

== Early life and education ==
Daim Zainuddin was born in Alor Setar, Kedah, British Malaya (now Malaysia). He was the youngest of thirteen siblings. His father, Mohd Zainuddin Hj Senawi, was a clerk in the Kedah State Civil Service, while his mother, Pok Rafeah Binti Ishak, was a homemaker. He received his early education at the Seberang Perak Malay School in Alor Setar. He later attended Sultan Abdul Hamid College, an English-medium school, and completed his upper secondary education at St. Xavier's Institution, George Town, Penang.

Daim's mother supported his aspirations to study law, selling the family's land to fund his education in the United Kingdom. He studied at Lincoln's Inn, London, for eighteen months and was called to the English Bar in 1959 at age 21. He later pursued further studies in Urban Planning at the University of California, Berkeley, completing the program in 1979.

In 2019, at the age of 81, Daim obtained a Doctor of Philosophy (PhD) degree from the University of Malaya after completing a thesis on the New Economic Policy which he had worked on for 11 years.

== Political career ==
Daim began his political career as a Senator from 1980 until his resignation to contest in the 1982 general election where he was elected as the Kuala Muda MP, before transferring to Merbok in 1986 and served as its MP until 2004 as a member of the United Malays National Organisation (UMNO).

Daim was appointed as Finance Minister under Prime Minister Mahathir Mohamad in 1984, serving until 1991, and later returning to the role from 1999 to 2001. Known for his economic policy work, Daim played a key advisory role in guiding Malaysia's economic recovery, with the GDP improving from a negative growth rate of 1.03% in 1985 to 9.06% in 1989.

He was expelled from UMNO over his support for Mahathir and the opposition Pakatan Harapan coalition in 2018. He helped campaign for the coalition in several marginal seats. Upon Pakatan Harapan's victory, he was appointed to the newly founded Council of Eminent Persons, which served as an advisory body to the new government. This body was dissolved at the end of its 100-day mandate.

== Business ventures ==
Daim began his career in real estate and finance in the 1970s, founding Syarikat Maluri Sdn Bhd in 1973, which played a pivotal role in developing Kuala Lumpur townships such as Taman Maluri and Taman Bukit Maluri. Over the years, he expanded his portfolio to include holdings in property development, hospitality, and materials, with companies like Ibu Kota Developments Sdn Bhd, Menara Ampang Sdn Bhd, and Avillion Bhd, which operates luxury hotels and resorts in Port Dickson, Pangkor, and Cameron Highlands.

In 1981, he expanded into banking by acquiring Banque Indosuez's local branches, rebranding it as the Malaysian-French Bank, which later became Alliance Bank. His international ventures included founding the International Commercial Bank (ICB) in Switzerland in 1991, which later extended to operations in Sierra Leone and Gambia.

Daim's business empire ultimately encompassed over 30 companies at the time of his death. Among his significant holdings, Avillion Bhd maintained a net book value of RM285.92 million despite financial difficulties in recent years. His son, Md Wira Dani, continues the family's involvement in Avillion Bhd, holding a 21.82% stake through Daza Holdings Sdn Bhd and Ibu Kota Developments Sdn Bhd.

== Corruption investigation ==
In May 2023, the Malaysian Anti-Corruption Commission (MACC) initiated an investigation into a 'former senior minister' over the alleged misappropriation of RM2.3 billion. The inquiry focused on two companies, Renong Sdn Bhd and United Engineers Malaysia Berhad, both linked to UMNO. Daim was the party's treasurer from 1984 to 2001. As part of a broader investigation stemming from the Pandora and Panama Papers which began in 2022, the MACC petitioned Daim to declare his and his family's assets. His refusal led to the seizure of Ilham Tower, a 58-storey building owned by Daim's family.

Daim and Mahathir, whose son has also been subjected to an anti-corruption probe, had accused the investigators of having political motivations in targeting government critics.

In January 2024, Daim was charged under anti-corruption laws for failing to declare 71 assets, including two investment accounts, six luxury vehicles, 24 properties and plots of land, and 38 companies. He appeared in court to plead not guilty, having been discharged from hospital before the indictment.

In November 2024, the prosecution dropped all charges against Daim and he was given a posthumous acquittal by the Sessions Court.

Investigations into Daim have continued past his death, with assets previously belonging to him, his family, as well as his proxies being seized by the MACC.

== Death ==
Daim died on 13 November 2024, having been admitted to Assunta Hospital, Petaling Jaya the previous month. He was 86. His funeral was held at the Federal Territory Mosque attended by family, dignitaries, and friends. He was buried at the Bukit Kiara Muslim Cemetery in Kuala Lumpur.

== Election results ==
Parliament of Malaysia
Year	Constituency	Candidate	Votes	Pct	Opponent(s)	Votes	Pct	Ballots cast	Majority	Turnout
1982	P012 Kuala Muda	Abdul Daim Zainuddin (UMNO)	21,782	73.82%	Gazzhali Dinn (PAS)	7,724	26.18%	30,570	14,058	76.79%
1986	P011 Merbok	Abdul Daim Zainuddin (UMNO)	20,712	74.83%	Reddhuan Oon (PAS)	6,967	25.17%	28,495	13,745	70.12%
1990	P011 Merbok	Abdul Daim Zainuddin (UMNO)	25,749	72.22%	Mohd Joharrie Abbiddin (S46)	9,906	27.78%	36,831	15,843	72.71%
1995	P014 Merbok	Abdul Daim Zainuddin (UMNO)	31,125	77.72%	Maherran Muktarr (S46)	8,924	22.28%	41,941	22,201	70.56%
1999	P014 Merbok	Abdul Daim Zainuddin (UMNO)	30,285	67.01%	Mocktar Mansor (KeADILan)	14,909	32.99%	46,599	15,376	73.19%

== Honours ==
=== Honours of Malaysia ===
- Malaysia
  - Grand Commander of the Order of Loyalty to the Crown of Malaysia (SSM) – Tun (1991)
- Kedah
  - Knight Commander of the Order of Loyalty to Sultan Abdul Halim Mu'adzam Shah (DHMS) – Dato' Paduka (1988)
- Malacca
  - Grand Commander of the Order of Malacca (DGSM) – Datuk Seri (2001)
- Pahang
  - Grand Knight of the Order of Sultan Ahmad Shah of Pahang (SSAP) – Dato' Sri (1988)
- Selangor
  - Knight Grand Commander of the Order of the Crown of Selangor (SPMS) – Dato' Seri (1997)

== See also ==
- Members of the Dewan Negara, 5th Malaysian Parliament
- List of people who have served in both Houses of the Malaysian Parliament
