= Kedah Tengah =

Kedah constituency

Defunct federal constituency
- Legislature: Dewan Rakyat
- Constituency created: 1955
- Constituency abolished: 1974
- First contested: 1955
- Last contested: 1969

Kedah Tengah was a federal constituency in Kedah, Malaysia, that was represented in the Dewan Rakyat from 1955 to 1974.

The federal constituency was created in the 1955 redistribution and was mandated to return a single member to the Dewan Rakyat under the first past the post voting system.

== History ==
It was abolished in 1974 when it was redistributed.

=== Representation history ===
Members of Parliament for Kedah Tengah
Parliament	No	Years	Member	Party	Vote Share
Constituency created
Federal Legislative Council
1st		1955–1959	Mohamed Khir Johari (محمد خير بن جوهري)	Alliance (UMNO)	31,077; 95.56%
Parliament of the Federation of Malaya
1st	P009	1959–1963	Mohamed Khir Johari (محمد خير بن جوهري)	Alliance (UMNO)	11,271; 66.53%
Parliament of Malaysia
1st	P009	1963–1964	Mohamed Khir Johari (محمد خير بن جوهري)	Alliance (UMNO)	11,271; 66.53%
2nd	P009	1964–1969	Mohamed Khir Johari (محمد خير بن جوهري)	Alliance (UMNO)	16,042; 74.95%
		1969–1971	Parliament was suspended		
3rd	P009	1971–1973	Mohamed Khir Johari (محمد خير بن جوهري)	Alliance (UMNO)	13,958; 54.65%
3rd	P009	1973–1974	Mohamed Khir Johari (محمد خير بن جوهري)	BN (UMNO)	13,958; 54.65%
Constituency abolished, split into Ulu Muda and Kuala Muda

=== State constituency ===
Parliamentary constituency	State constituency						
Parliamentary constituency	1955–1959*	1959–1974	1974–1986	1986–1995	1995–2004	2004–2018	2018–present
Kedah Tengah	Jerai						
Kedah Tengah		Kota					
Kedah Tengah		Sik-Gurun					
Kedah Tengah	Sik-Gurun-Kota						

=== Historical boundaries ===
State Constituency	Area
State Constituency	1959
Kota	Bedong; Bujang; Kampung Bagan Ulu; Kuala Muda; Semeling
Sik-Gurun	Beris Jaya; Gulau; Jeniang; Kampung Pajang; Sik

== Election results ==
Malaysian general election, 1969: Kedah Tengah
Party	Candidate	Votes	%	∆%
Alliance	Mohamed Khir Johari	13,958	54.65	▼20.30
PMIP	Ahmad Othman	11,583	45.35	▲20.30
Total valid votes		25,541	100.00	
Total rejected ballots		1,136		
Unreturned ballots		0		
Turnout		26,677	75.57	▲0.82
Registered electors		35,302		
Majority		2,375	9.30	▼40.60
Alliance hold		Swing		

Malaysian general election, 1964: Kedah Tengah
Party	Candidate	Votes	%	∆%
Alliance	Mohamed Khir Johari	16,042	74.95	▲8.42
PMIP	Hussain Che Dol	5,362	25.05	▼1.13
Total valid votes		21,404	100.00	
Total rejected ballots		885		
Unreturned ballots		0		
Turnout		22,289	74.72	▼0.68
Registered electors		29,829		
Majority		10,680	49.90	▲6.55
Alliance hold		Swing		

Malaysian general by-election, 30 September 1959: Kedah Tengah
Party	Candidate	Votes	%	∆%
Khir was elected to Parliament in the Kedah Tengah by-election, 1959. Kedah Tengah is the only remaining constituency where elections have not been completed in the Malayan general election, 1959.
Alliance	Mohamed Khir Johari	11,271	66.53	▼29.03
PMIP	Hussain Che Dol	4,435	26.18	▲26.18
Socialist Front	Mohamed Shariff Babul	1,234	7.28	▲7.28
Total valid votes		16,940	100.00	
Total rejected ballots		223		
Unreturned ballots		0		
Turnout		17,163	75.40	▼4.40
Registered electors		22,762		
Majority		6,836	43.35	▼47.81
Alliance hold		Swing		

Malayan general election, 1955: Kedah Tengah
Party	Candidate	Votes	%
Alliance	Mohamed Khir Johari	31,077	95.56
NEGARA	Puteh Napa	1,431	4.40
Total valid votes		32,508	100.00
Total rejected ballots			
Unreturned ballots			
Turnout		32,508	89.80
Registered electors		36,200	
Majority		29,646	91.16
This was a new constituency created.
Source(s): The Straits Times.
