= Tanjung Dawai (state constituency) =

State constituency in Kedah, Malaysia

Tanjung Dawai (N26)
Kedah constituency

State constituency
- Legislature: Kedah State Legislative Assembly
MLA
Hanif Ghazali
PN
- Constituency created: 1984
- First contested: 1986
- Last contested: 2023

Demographics
- Electors (2023): 54,629

Tanjung Dawai is a state constituency in Kedah, Malaysia, that has been represented in the Kedah State Legislative Assembly.

== Demographics ==
As of 2020, Tanjong Dawai has a population of 65,725 people.

Ethnic breakdown of Tanjung Dawai's electorate as of 2023
1. Malay (81.2%)
2. Chinese (11.7%)
3. Indian (5.69%)
4. Other ethnicities (1.47%)

== History ==
=== Polling districts ===
According to the gazette issued on 30 March 2018, the Tanjung Dawai constituency has a total of 19 polling districts.

State constituency	Polling districts	Code	Location
Tanjung Dawai (N26)	Bujang	014/26/01	MRSM Merbok
Tanjung Dawai (N26)	Pekan Sabtu Merbok	014/26/02	SJK (C) Sin Hwa
Tanjung Dawai (N26)	Simpang Tiga Pasir	014/26/03	SK Merbok (Pusat)
Tanjung Dawai (N26)	Pekan Merbok	014/26/04	SMK Merbok
Tanjung Dawai (N26)	Kampung Pasir	014/26/05	SK Kampong Pasir
Tanjung Dawai (N26)	Kampung Huma	014/26/06	SK Tanjung Dawai
Tanjung Dawai (N26)	Tanjung Dawai	014/26/07	SJK (C) Choong Cheng
Tanjung Dawai (N26)	Batu Hampar	014/26/08	SK Batu Hampar
Tanjung Dawai (N26)	Pengkalan Bujang	014/26/09	SK Haji Omar Tahir
Tanjung Dawai (N26)	Sungai Gelam	014/26/10	SK Sultan Mudzaffar Shah
Tanjung Dawai (N26)	Sungai Jagong	014/26/11	SA Daris
Tanjung Dawai (N26)	Sungai Layar	014/26/12	SK Sungai Layar
Tanjung Dawai (N26)	Semeling Kanan	014/26/13	SK Semeling
Tanjung Dawai (N26)	Semeling Kiri	014/26/14	SJK (C) Ching Chong
Tanjung Dawai (N26)	Kampung Bedong	014/16/15	SJK (T) Bedong
Tanjung Dawai (N26)	Taman Orkid	014/26/16	SMK Sungai Layar
Tanjung Dawai (N26)	Taman Sri Tanjung	014/26/17	SK Tun Syes Jan Al-Jaffri
Tanjung Dawai (N26)	Bunga Raya	014/26/18	SMK Ibrahim
Tanjung Dawai (N26)	Sekolah Ibrahim	014/26/19	SK Ibrahim

=== Representation history ===
Kedah State Legislative Assemblyman for Tanjung Dawai
Assembly	No	Years	Member	Party
Constituency created from Merbok, Jeniang and Tikam Batu
7th	N18	1986–1990	Rokiah Hashim	BN (UMNO)
8th	N18	1990–1995	Rokiah Hashim	BN (UMNO)
9th	N26	1995–1999	Badri Yunus	BN (UMNO)
10th	N26	1999–2004	Rosnah Majid	BN (UMNO)
11th	N26	2004–2008	Arzmi Hamid	BN (UMNO)
12th	N26	2008–2013	Hamdan Mohamed Khalib	PR (PAS)
13th	N26	2013–2018	Tajul Urus Mat Zain	BN (UMNO)
14th	N26	2018–2020	Hanif Ghazali	PAS
14th	N26	2020–2023	Hanif Ghazali	PN (PAS)
15th	N26	2023–present	Hanif Ghazali	PN (PAS)

== Election results ==
Kedah state election, 2023
Party	Candidate	Votes	%	∆%
PN	Hanif Ghazali	31,996	76.94	▲76.94
BN	Shaiful Hazizy Zainol Abidin	9,591	23.06	▼9.14
Total valid votes		41,587	100.00	
Total rejected ballots		307		
Unreturned ballots		43		
Turnout		41,937	76.77	▼7.23
Registered electors		54,629		
Majority		22,405	53.88	▲50.94
PN hold		Swing		

Kedah state election, 2018
Party	Candidate	Votes	%	∆%
PAS	Hanif Ghazali	11,444	35.37	▼9.70
PKR	Annuar Abdul Hamid	10,492	32.43	▲32.43
BN	Annuar Ahmad	10,421	32.20	▼23.73
Total valid votes		32,357	100.00	
Total rejected ballots		645		
Unreturned ballots		0		
Turnout		33,123	84.00	▼4.30
Registered electors		39,415		
Majority		952	2.94	▼7.92
PAS gain from BN		Swing		?

Kedah state election, 2013
Party	Candidate	Votes	%	∆%
BN	Tajul Urus Mat Zain	17,818	55.93	▲5.10
PAS	Ahmad Fakhruddin Fakhurazi	14,038	45.07	▼5.10
Total valid votes		31,856	100.00	
Total rejected ballots		546		
Unreturned ballots		95		
Turnout		32,497	88.30	▲7.24
Registered electors		36,821		
Majority		3,780	10.86	▲10.52
BN gain from PAS		Swing		?

Kedah state election, 2008
Party	Candidate	Votes	%	∆%
PAS	Hamdan Mohamed Khalib	11,497	50.17	▲12.39
BN	Arzmi Hamid	11,418	49.83	▼12.39
Total valid votes		22,915	100.00	
Total rejected ballots		618		
Unreturned ballots		351		
Turnout		23,884	81.06	▲2.38
Registered electors		29,466		
Majority		79	0.34	▼24.10
PAS gain from BN		Swing		?

Kedah state election, 2004
Party	Candidate	Votes	%	∆%
BN	Arzmi Hamid	13,111	62.22	▲5.82
PAS	Hamdan Mohamed Khalib	7,960	37.78	▼5.82
Total valid votes		21,071	100.00	
Total rejected ballots		643		
Unreturned ballots		1		
Turnout		21,715	78.68	▲3.40
Registered electors		27,600		
Majority		5,151	24.44	▲11.64
BN hold		Swing		

Kedah state election, 1999
Party	Candidate	Votes	%	∆%
BN	Hajah Rosnah Majid	8,285	56.40	▼10.82
PAS	Mohd Yusof Omar	6,404	43.60	▲10.82
Total valid votes		14,689	100.00	
Total rejected ballots		440		
Unreturned ballots		12		
Turnout		15,141	75.28	▲3.57
Registered electors		20,113		
Majority		1,881	12.80	▼21.64
BN hold		Swing		

Kedah state election, 1995
Party	Candidate	Votes	%	∆%
BN	Badri Hj Yunus	8,931	67.22	▲2.74
PAS	Mohd Yusof Omar	4,356	32.78	▼2.74
Total valid votes		13,287	100.00	
Total rejected ballots		415		
Unreturned ballots		4		
Turnout		13,706	71.71	▼2.02
Registered electors		19,113		
Majority		4,575	34.44	▼4.48
BN hold		Swing		

Kedah state election, 1990
Party	Candidate	Votes	%	∆%
BN	Rokiah Haji Hashim	14,399	69.96	▲0.35
PAS	Ghazali Hj Din	6,183	31.04	▼0.35
Total valid votes		20,582	100.00	
Total rejected ballots		870		
Unreturned ballots		0		
Turnout		21,452	73.73	▲3.04
Registered electors		29,095		
Majority		8,216	38.92	▲0.70
BN hold		Swing		

Kedah state election, 1986
Party	Candidate	Votes	%
BN	Rokiah Haji Hashim	10,321	69.61
PAS	Mat Akhir Talib	4,505	31.39
Total valid votes		14,826	100.00
Total rejected ballots		421	
Unreturned ballots		0	
Turnout		15,247	70.69
Registered electors		21,570	
Majority		5,816	38.22
This was a new constituency created.
