= Hanif Ghazali =

Malaysian politician (born 1973)

Yang Berhormat Tuan Hanif Ghazali MLA
- حنيف غزالي

Member of the Kedah State Legislative Assembly for Tanjong Dawai
- Incumbent
- Assumed office 9 May 2018
- Preceded by: Tajul Urus Mat Zain (BN–UMNO)
- Majority: 952 (2018); 22,405 (2023)

Personal details
- Born: 1 January 1973 (age 53)
- Party: Malaysian Islamic Party (PAS)
- Other political affiliations: Gagasan Sejahtera (GS) (–2018); Perikatan Nasional (2020–present)
- Occupation: Politician

Hanif bin Ghazali (Jawi: حنيف غزالي; born 1 January 1973) is a Malaysian politician who been served as member of the Kedah State Legislative Assembly of Tanjung Dawai, Kedah contested on the PAS ticket. He is a member of the Malaysian Islamic Party.

== Election results ==
Kedah State Legislative Assembly
Year	Constituency	Candidate	Votes	Pct	Opponent(s)	Votes	Pct	Ballots cast	Majority	Turnout
2023	N26 Tanjong Dawai	Hanif Ghazali (PAS)	31,996	76.94%	Shaiful Hazizy Zainol Abidin (UMNO)	9,591	23.06%	41,587	22,405	76.77%
