= National Indian Muslim Alliance Party =

Political party of Malaysia

Indian Muslim Alliance National Party
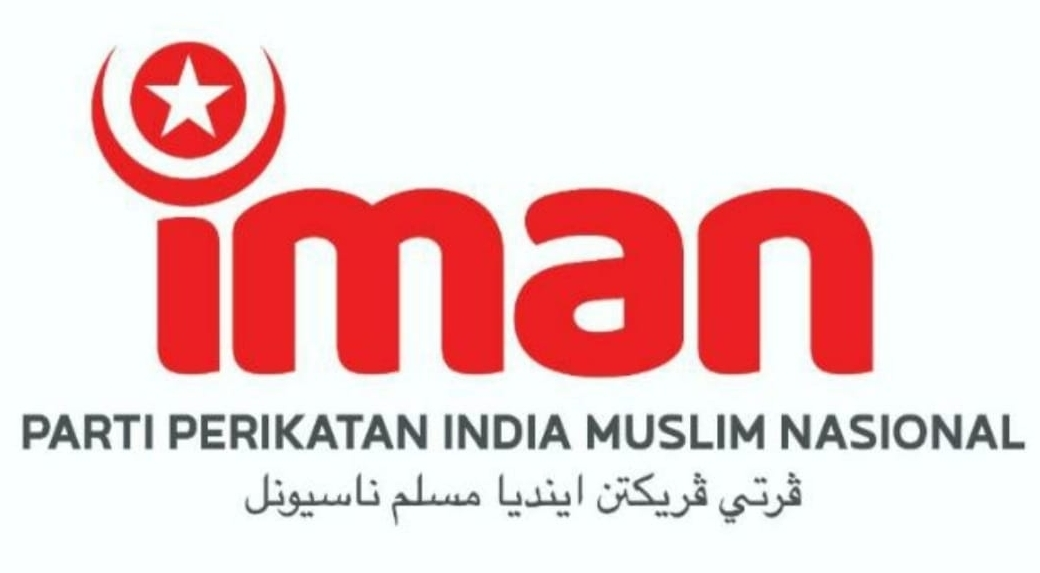
- Malay name: Parti Perikatan India Muslim Nasional ڤرتي ڤريكتن اينديا مسلم ناسيونل
- Chinese name: 印裔穆斯林国民联盟政党
- Tamil name: இந்திய முஸ்லிம் கூட்டணி கட்சி
- Abbreviation: IMAN
- President: Datuk Mohammed Mosin Abdul Razak
- Secretary-General: Dr Amir Hamzah Abdul Rajak
- Founder: Dato' Syed Jamarulkhan Kader
- Founded: 28 May 2019
- Preceded by: Parti India Muslim Bersatu Malaysia (PIBM)
- Headquarters: 11A, Jalan Opera J U2/J, Taman TTDI Jaya, 40150 Shah Alam, Selangor, Malaysia.
- Ideology: Malaysian Indian Muslim interests
- Religion: Islam
- National affiliation: Friends of PN (since 2023) (Note: The party was part of Gerakan Tanah Air (2022-2023)); Ikatan Prihatin Rakyat (since 2025)
- Colors: Red; White
- Dewan Negara: 0 / 70
- Dewan Rakyat: 0 / 222
- State Legislative Assemblies: 0 / 607

The National Indian Muslim Alliance Party (Malay: Parti Perikatan India Muslim Nasional; Jawi: ڤرتي ڤريكتن اينديا مسلم ناسيونل; Tamil: இந்திய முஸ்லிம் கூட்டணி கட்சி, romanized: Desiya India Muslim Koottani Katchi; abbreviated IMAN) is a Malaysian Indian-Muslim based political party renamed in September 2020 from the initially Parti India Muslim Bersatu Malaysia abbreviated PIBM registered in 2019.

Having supported Perikatan Nasional since the alliance's foundation, the party was recognized as Friends of PN in 2023.

== General Election Results ==
Election	Total seats won	Seats contested	Total votes	Voting Percentage	Outcome of election	Election leader
2022	0 / 222	4	4,136	0.03%	; No representation in Parliament (Gerakan Tanah Air)	Mohammed Mosin Abdul Razak

== State election results ==
The party contested one seat, Machap Jaya state seat in Malacca State Legislative Assembly, in the 2021 Malacca state election but failed in its maiden electoral debut with the sole candidate lost its deposits.

State assembly	Election	Votes	%	Seats	+/–	Position (Note: As part of electoral coalition.)	Status
Perlis	2022	Did not contest					No seats
Kedah	2023	Did not contest					No seats
Kelantan	2023	Did not contest					No seats
Terengganu	2023	Did not contest					No seats
Penang	2023	Did not contest					No seats
Perak	2022	Did not contest					No seats
Pahang	2022	Did not contest					No seats
Selangor	2023	Did not contest					No seats
Negeri Sembilan	2026	Did not contest					No seats
Malacca	2026	Did not contest					No seats
Johor	2026	Did not contest					No seats
Sabah	2025	Did not contest					No seats
Sarawak	2021	Did not contest					No seats

Note

State election	State Legislative Assembly	
State election	Malacca	Total won / Total contested
2/3 majority	2 / 3	
2021	0 / 28	0 / 1

== Leadership ==
- President
  - Mohammed Mosin Abdul Razak
- Secretary-General
  - Amir Hamzah Abdul Rajak

== See also ==
- Politics of Malaysia
- List of political parties in Malaysia
- Malaysian Indian Muslim Congress (KIMMA)
