= List of former employees of McKinsey & Company =

The following is a list of notable former employees of McKinsey & Company, a management consulting firm founded in 1926. This group is often referred to as a group in its own right. According to the company's information, there are currently 34,000 McKinsey alumni working at over 15,000 organizations across the private, public, and social sectors in 120 countries.

== Business ==
- Vikram Akula – founder and former CEO of SKS Microfinance
- Imran Amed – founder of Business of Fashion
- Mahlon Apgar IV – founder of Apgar & Company
- Frank Appel – CEO of Deutsche Post DHL
- Delphine Arnault – Executive Vice President of Louis Vuitton
- Sarah Friar – CFO of OpenAI
- Carter F. Bales – co-founder, chairman and Managing Partner of NewWorld Capital Group
- Srini Bangalore, Chief Client Officer, CASETEAM
- Sir John Banham – former director-general of the Chicago Bridge & Iron Company and former chairman of Whitbread
- Bengt Baron – gold medalist at the 1980 Summer Olympics, former CEO and president of Vin & Spirit
- Dominic Barton – former global managing director of McKinsey & Company
- Oliver Bäte – CEO of Allianz
- Wolfgang Bernhard – Daimler board member and executive
- Atyab Bhatti – founder and CEO of SkyLink, an Amadeus Company
- John Birt, Baron Birt – former director-general of the BBC (1992–2000) and special adviser to Tony Blair
- Martin Blessing – CEO of Commerzbank
- André Borschberg – founder of Solar Impulse
- Marvin Bower – Managing Director of McKinsey & Company (1950–67)
- Roelof Botha – Senior steward at Sequoia Capital
- Robert Brisco – CEO of Internet Brands
- Benjamin Joe – Head of APAC at Meta Platforms
- Matt Brittin – Former head of EMEA at Google
- Shona Brown – former Google executive
- Adam Cahan – Yahoo executive
- Francesco Caio – serial CEO and/or founder from Omnitel, Olivetti, Merloni, Netscalibur and Cable & Wireless plc
- Roderick Carnegie – Chairman of the Pacific Edge Group
- Anil Chakravarthy, CEO, Adobe
- Humphrey Cobbold – former CEO cycling business Wiggle and current CEO of PureGym
- Ronald Cohen – co-founder and former chairman of Apax Partners
- Matt Cohler – General Partner at Benchmark Capital
- David Coleman – CEO of The College Board
- Vittorio Colao – CEO of Vodafone
- Richard Currie – former chairman of BCE Inc and Bell Canada
- Ian Davis – former Managing Director of McKinsey & Company and current chairman for Rolls-Royce Holdings
- Ron Daniel – former worldwide managing director at McKinsey & Company
- Julian Day – former CEO of Kmart and RadioShack
- Dido Harding – CEO of TalkTalk Group and Member of the House of Lords
- Henrique De Castro – former Google executive and former chief operating officer of Yahoo!
- Etienne de Villiers – former executive chairman and president of the ATP Tour, former president of Walt Disney, and former chairman of BBC Worldwide
- David Carl Edelman – CMO at Aetna
- John Elliott – Australian businessman
- Erik Engstrom – CEO of Reed Elsevier
- Carolyn Fairbairn – former BBC and ITV executive
- Diana Farrell – CEO of JPMorgan Chase Institute
- Bernard T. Ferrari – Dean of Johns Hopkins University Carey Business School
- Richard N. Foster – managing partner of Investment and Advisory Services LLC
- Jane Fraser – CEO of Citigroup
- Jeff George – CEO of Sandoz International GmbH
- Mike George – president and CEO of QVC Inc
- Louis V. Gerstner, Jr. – former chairman and CEO of IBM and former chairman of The Carlyle Group
- Shuman Ghosemajumder – CTO of Shape Security
- Caroline Ghosn – cofounder and CEO of Levo League
- George N. Gillett, Jr. – founder of Gillette Holdings. Former owner of the Montreal Canadiens and England's Liverpool Football Club
- Simon Glinsky – Co-founder of Match.com later Match Group
- James P. Gorman – chairman and CEO of Morgan Stanley
- Mario Greco – CEO of Zurich Insurance Group
- Stephen Green (banker) – chairman of HSBC
- Rajat Gupta – Managing Director of McKinsey & Company (1994–2003)
- Bob Haas – chairman of Levi Strauss & Co
- John Hagel – author and consultant
- Torstein Hagen – founder of Viking River Cruises
- Suzanne Heywood – chairperson of CNH Industrial
- Ken Hicks – CEO of Foot Locker
- Dennis F. Hightower – former President, Europe, Middle East & Africa (Paris) and President, Television & Telecommunications at Walt Disney. Former CEO, Europe Online Networks (Luxembourg)
- Kathleen Hogan – Chief People Officer at Microsoft
- Charlotte Hogg – COO of the Bank of England
- Egil Hogna – CEO of Sapa Group
- Betsy Holden – former co-CEO of Kraft Foods; later joined McKinsey as a senior advisor
- Amy Howe – current Chief Operating Officer (COO) of Ticketmaster, a Live Nation subsidiary
- Eric Janvier – co-founder, Schlumberger Business Consulting
- Hubert Joly – CEO of Best Buy and former CEO of hospitality companies
- Philip Johnston – Co-Founder and CEO of Starcloud
- Aditya Julka – founder of Paddle8
- Markus Kattner – former Secretary-General of FIFA
- Jon Katzenbach – Founder of Katzenbach Partners
- Thomas Kurian – CEO of Google Cloud
- George Kurian – CEO of NetApp
- Hosein Khajeh-Hosseiny – British Private Equity investor
- Andrew Thomas Kearney – Founder of management consulting firm A.T. Kearney
- Susanne Klatten – Germany's richest woman; heir to the BMW fortune
- Marius Kloppers – former CEO of BHP
- Jørgen Vig Knudstorp – CEO of Lego Group
- Melanie Kreis – CFO Deutsche Post
- Anil Kumar – former Director at McKinsey & Company and co-founder of the Indian School of Business who pled guilty to insider trading
- Mark Leiter (businessman) – Chairman and Chief Strategy Officer of Leiter & Company
- Tom Leppert – CEO of Kaplan, Inc
- Helge Lund – CEO of BG Group and former CEO of StatoilHydro
- Alonzo L. McDonald – former president and vice chairman of the Bendix Corporation
- Aslaug Magnusdottir – founder of fashion company Tinker Tailor (brand)
- Fred Malek – former president of Marriott Hotels and Northwest Airlines
- John C. Malone – former chairman of Liberty Media; CEO and Chairman of Discovery Holding Company
- Charlie Mayfield – chairman of John Lewis Partnership 2007 -
- James Paul Manzi – chairman and CEO of Lotus Development Corporation
- James McNerney – former chairman and CEO of Boeing
- Kip Meek – former chairman of the Broadband Stakeholder Group
- Kathryn Minshew – cofounder of TheMuse.com
- Deanna M. Mulligan – CEO of Guardian Life
- Tomoko Namba – founder of mobile games developer DeNA
- Ian Narev – CEO of Commonwealth Bank
- Roberto Nicastro – head of retail at Unicredit Group
- Kenichi Ohmae – corporate strategist
- Azran Osman Rani – CEO of AirAsia X
- David Palecek – US management consultant
- Helmut Panke – former chairman and CEO of BMW
- Roger Parry – former chairman and CEO of Clear Channel International. Current chairman of YouGov
- Corrado Passera – former Italian Minister of Development and Minister of Infrastructures and ex-CEO of Intesa Sanpaolo
- Prashant Pathak – Managing Partner of ReichmannHauer Capital Partners
- Michael Patsalos-Fox – Chairman, President & CEO at Vidyo
- J. Michael Pearson – former CEO and chairman of Valeant Pharmaceuticals
- Sundar Pichai – CEO of Alphabet Inc and Google
- Patrick Pichette – Former CFO of Google and Venture Capitalist
- Alessandro Profumo – former CEO of UniCredit
- Phil Purcell – former chairman and CEO of Morgan Stanley
- Robert Reffkin – CEO and co-founder of Compass, Inc.
- Cyriac Roeding – ShopKick cofounder and CEO
- Tagg Romney – US venture capitalist
- David O. Sacks – founder of Yammer
- Sheryl Sandberg – COO of Facebook
- Peter Sands – CEO of Standard Chartered Bank
- Silvio Scaglia – founder of Fastweb
- Paolo Scaroni – CEO, Eni – ex-CEO, Enel
- Jonathan I. Schwartz – former CEO of Sun Microsystems
- Lara Setrakian – founder of Syria Deeply
- Kevin W. Sharer – former chairman and CEO of Amgen Inc.
- António Simões (executive) – Banking executive, CEO Global Private Banking, HSBC
- Jeff Skilling – former CEO of Enron
- Tad Smith – CEO of Sotheby's
- Jonathan Spector – CEO of The Conference Board
- Gerald L. Storch – CEO of Hudson Bay and former chairman and CEO of Toys "R" Us
- Stephan Sturm – CEO of Fresenius
- Fred Swaniker – entrepreneur and co-founder of the African Leadership Academy
- Tidjane Thiam – CEO of Credit Suisse and former CEO of Prudential
- Pamela Thomas-Graham – Chief talent, branding and communications officer at Credit Suisse. Formerly CEO of CNBC
- Evan Thornley – co-founder of LookSmart and CEO of Better Place
- Peter Thum – founder, Ethos Water and social entrepreneur
- Wayne Ting – CEO of Lime, former chief of staff to Uber CEO Dara Khosrowshahi
- Parit Wacharasindhu – Thai politician and social entrepreneur
- Amelia Warren Tyagi – daughter of Elizabeth Warren
- Joey Wat – CEO of Yum China
- Johanna Waterous – London-based Canadian businesswoman
- Carlos Watson – former anchor for MSNBC and founder of news site OZY
- Miles D. White – chairman and CEO of Abbott Laboratories
- Sir Robert Worcester – founder of MORI
- Peter Wuffli – former CEO of UBS AG
- Tony Xu – CEO of DoorDash
- Kaushik Joshi – Head of New Initiatives (Monetisation) of Rapido
- Klaus Zumwinkel – ex-chairman of Deutsche Post
- Jack Herrick – founder of WikiHow and eHow
- HK (Hurkan) Kurtoglu – Founder and CEO of LiberTea Coin

== Government ==
- Bradley M. Berkson – former United States Department of Defense Director of Program Analysis and Evaluation
- Lael Brainard – board of governors, U.S. Federal Reserve System
- Esther Brimmer – former Assistant Secretary of State for International Organization Affairs
- Ryan Brumberg – former U.S. Congressional candidate
- Pete Buttigieg – Mayor of South Bend, Indiana and 2020 Presidential Candidate, former Secretary of Transportation
- Mary Burke – former Wisconsin Secretary of Commerce
- Sylvia Mathews Burwell – former U.S. Secretary of Health and Human Services; former director of the United States Office of Management and Budget
- Rohit Chopra – consumer advocate and Commissioner on the U.S. Federal Trade Commission
- Bjarne Corydon – Finance Minister of Denmark
- Tom Cotton – U.S. Senator from Arkansas
- Jim Coutts (deceased) – Canadian Prime Ministerial advisor (1963–66, 1975–81)
- Dan Debicella – Connecticut State Senator (2006-2010) and Congressional Candidate
- Isabel Dedring – Deputy Mayor for Transport, City of London
- Božidar Đelić – Serbian Minister of Economy and Finance (2001–2003), vice-president of the Government of Serbia (2007–2012)
- Oleksandr Danylyuk – former Ukrainian finance minister
- Stephen Donnelly – Fianna Fáil Member of Parliament and Irish shadow minister for health
- Roger W. Ferguson, Jr. – current president and CEO of TIAA-CREF; former vice chairman of the board of governors of the Federal Reserve System (2001–2006)
- Randy Fine – Member of United States House of Representatives
- Thomas C. Foley – US ambassador to Ireland
- Robert G. Greenhill – president of the Canadian International Development Agency
- William Hague – former foreign secretary of Britain and former leader of the Conservative party in the House of Commons
- Dennis F. Hightower – former deputy secretary, U.S. Department of Commerce
- Wopke Hoekstra – European Commissioner for Climate Action and former Minister of Finance and Minister of Foreign Affairs of the Netherlands
- Wendell Hulcher – former mayor of Ann Arbor, Michigan
- Reed Hundt – former chairman of the Federal Communications Commission (1993-1997)
- Greg Hunt – Member of the Australian House of Representatives (2001–present)
- Radovan Jelašić – former governor of the National Bank of Serbia
- Bobby Jindal – Governor of the State of Louisiana (2008–2016); former member of the U.S. House of Representatives (2004–2008)
- Nancy Killefer – Assistant Secretary for Management, CFO, and COO at the United States Department of the Treasury (1997–2000)
- John D. Macomber – former president of the Export-Import Bank of the United States (1989–1992)
- Nadiem Makarim – Minister of Education and Culture of Indonesia (2019–Present)
- Jack Markell – Governor of Delaware
- David McCormick – Business executive, former U.S. Treasury Under Secretary for International Affairs
- Karen Mills – former head of the Small Business Administration (SBA)
- Toshimitsu Motegi – former minister for economy, trade and industry of Japan
- Kyriakos Mitsotakis – Prime Minister of Greece (2019–present)
- Arthur Mutambara – Zimbabwean politician; former head of the Movement for Democratic Change
- Naheed Nenshi – Mayor of Calgary (2010–present)
- Greg Orman – former U.S. Senate candidate from Kansas
- Peter Orszag – economist, Barack Obama's OMB director designate, former CBO director, formerly of the Brookings Institution
- Joris Poort – US engineer
- Susan E. Rice – American diplomat; former U.S. National Security Council Advisor and former U.S. Ambassador to the United Nations
- Jayant Sinha – former finance minister for India and former Managing Director at Omidyar Network
- Angus Taylor – Australian Leader of the Opposition
- Van Taylor – former U.S. Congressional candidate and current Texas state senator.
- Eric Wiebes – State Secretary of Finance (2014–2017) and Minister of Economic Affairs and Climate Policy (2017–2021) of the Netherlands
- Einat Wilf – Israeli politician
- Pieter Winsemius – former Dutch Minister of Housing, Spatial Planning and the Environment (1982–1986, 2006–2007)

== Academics ==
- Mahmoud Reza Banki – Iranian scientist
- Christopher A. Bartlett – author, academic and professor emeritus at Harvard Business School
- Scott C. Beardsley – Dean, Darden School of Business at the University of Virginia
- Rufus Black – Vice-Chancellor of the University of Tasmania
- James C. Collins – academic, author Good to Great
- Charles R. Conn – former warden and global CEO of Rhodes House and the Rhodes Trust
- Angela Duckworth – A psychologist who studied and wrote about grit
- Bernard T. Ferrari – Dean, Johns Hopkins University Carey Business School
- Gerd Hahn – German economist
- Dennis F. Hightower – former Professor of Management at Harvard Business School
- Kenneth E. Iverson – Canadian computer scientist
- Myles Lavan – Professor of Classics at the University of St. Andrews
- Martin Roll – strategy author
- Matthew C. Weinzierl – professor at Harvard Business School

== Other ==
- Paul Antony – chief medical officer of the Pharmaceutical Research and Manufacturers of America
- Peter Attia – author
- Martin Neil Baily – Senior Fellow of the Brookings Institution
- David Bennett – former CEO of Monitor (NHS)
- Victor Cheng – author, blogger
- David Churbuck – blogger; partner Sitrick And Company
- Chelsea Clinton – Vice Chairman, Clinton Foundation, daughter of former U.S. President Bill Clinton and Secretary of State Hillary Clinton
- Howard Davies – Chairman of the Royal Bank of Scotland; former director of the London School of Economics and former chairman of the British Financial Services Authority
- Bill Drayton – founder and CEO of Ashoka
- Aditya Tyagi – co-founder, i-Saksham, an organisation building young women as leaders of change
- Anand Giridharadas – author
- Chris Goodall – environmental author, speaker and consultant, as well as Green Party parliamentary candidate
- Robert C. Gay – senior member of the Church of Jesus Christ of Latter-day Saints
- Mohsin Hamid – author
- Tom Hayhoe – healthcare director, former politician, and offshore racing sailor
- Fred Hilmer – former CEO of Fairfax Media and former president and vice chancellor of University of South Wales
- Lisa Joy – American screenwriter, director and producer and the co-creator of Westworld
- Kazuyo Katsuma – Japanese author
- Laura Kits – Dutch singer and songwriter and activist
- Yul Kwon – business, law, government and media background; winner of reality TV show Survivor: Cook Islands in 2006
- Phil Lapsley – electrical engineer, author and entrepreneur
- Georgia Lee – filmmaker
- Jeff Luhnow – General Manager of the Houston Astros
- Dina Nayeri – Iranian American novelist
- Thomas J. Peters – business author and speaker
- Chris Philp – cofounder of Clearstone and member of British Parliament for Croydon South
- Alejandro Plaz – founder of Súmate
- Stuart Shilson – Assistant Private Secretary to Queen Elizabeth II in the Royal Household
- Josh Singer – American screenwriter and producer
- Adair Turner, Baron Turner of Ecchinswell – British businessperson, academic and technocrat; formerly served as chairman of the UK Financial Services Authority and the UK Financial Policy Committee
- James Twining – former investment banker, McKinsey consultant and entrepreneur; current thriller writer
- Luis Ubiñas – former president of the Ford Foundation
- Kieran West – retired English rower and Olympic champion
- Brett Wigdortz – founder of the charity Teach First
- Jason Wright – team president of the Washington Football Team
- Prince Friso of Orange-Nassau – Prince of the Dutch Royal family
- Vienna Teng – singer, songwriter
- Eric Edstrom – whistleblower, author
- Garrison Lovely – whistleblower, journalist
