= Weinzierl (surname) =

Weinzierl is a surname of German origin. It is an occupational surname for a maker or seller of wine (vintner), or a habitational name from similarly named places in Austria and Bavaria. Notable people with the surname include:

- Jan Weinzierl (born 1973), German tennis player
- Kurt Weinzierl (1931–2008), Austrian television actor
- Laura Lee Lane Weinzierl (1900–1928), American geologist, paleontologist
- Markus Weinzierl (born 1974), German football coach
- Matthew C. Weinzierl, American economist
- Maximilian Weinzierl (born 1997), Austrian politician
- Nathalie Weinzierl (born 1994), German figure skater
