= Weinzierl =

Weinzierl may refer to:

- Weinzierl am Walde, a town in Austria
- Weinzierl Castle, a castle in Austria
- Weinzierl (surname)
