= Garrison Lovely =

American journalist and whistleblower

- Education: Cornell University
- Occupation: Journalist
- Employer: McKinsey & Company (formerly)
- Notable work: Confessions of a McKinsey Whistleblower — The Nation

Garrison Lovely is an American journalist and former employee of the consulting firm McKinsey & Company.

== Career ==
=== Coverage of McKinsey & Company ===
Lovely began his career in 2017 as an intern at McKinsey, and later became a full-time employee. He was assigned to projects for Immigration and Customs Enforcement (ICE), Rikers Island and other clients— this experience became crucial for some of his subsequent work.

In 2019, Lovely wrote an article in Current Affairs, originally published anonymously, titled "McKinsey & Company: Capital’s Willing Executioners", which detailed former projects run by McKinsey, commented on the secretive office culture of the firm, and information on employee's access to luxury food and accommodations, and criticized various aspects of the firm's business practices, such as their ties to the Saudi Arabian government and Saudi Crown Prince Mohammed bin Salman. The article was later attributed to Lovely.

In 2022, CBS Sunday Morning ran a segment on Walt Bogdanich and Michael Forsythe's book, When McKinsey Comes to Town, which covers the firm's recruiting practices, its sway over global industries and its impact on information sharing. Lovely served as a source for the book along with fellow McKinsey alum Erik Edstrom; both were interviewed as part of the segment. Many of Bogdanich and Forsythe's other sources remained anonymous. Lovely covered similar subject matter in The Nation's September 2023 cover story "Confessions of a McKinsey Whistleblower", which was subsequently translated and republished in Le Monde Diplomatique.

=== Other publications ===
Lovely has covered the environmental impact of pescatarian diets for Vox and the role of technological progress in metascience for BBC Future.

Lovely interviewed R.E.M. frontman Michael Stipe in 2021 for Jacobin, touching on topics like apartheid, democratic socialism, and Stipe's upbringing as a military brat.

In 2025, The Nation announced its new joint publishing imprint together with OR Books, called Nation Books. Lovely was listed among the imprint's inaugural authors. His book, Obsolete, critiques the AI industry.

== Bibliography ==
- Lovely, Garrison (2026). Obsolete: The AI Industry's Trillion-Dollar Race to Replace Us—and How to Stop It. OR Books. ISBN 9781682196304.
