= David Edelman =

David Edelman may refer to:

- David Louis Edelman (born 1971), American novelist and web programmer
- David Carl Edelman (born 1961), chief marketing officer at Aetna
- R. David Edelman, American policymaker and academic
