= Ajit Mohan =

Indian technology executive

- Born: 1974 or 1975 (age 51–52); Kochi, Kerala, India
- Education: Nanyang Technological University; Paul H. Nitze School of Advanced International Studies (Johns Hopkins University; Wharton School (University of Pennsylvania)
- Employer: Snap Inc.
- Organizations: Meta India; Internet and Mobile Association of India; Museum of Art & Photography

Ajit Mohan is an Indian technology executive who is currently serving as the Chief Business Officer of Snap Inc. Previously, he was the President for the Asia-Pacific operations. He was also vice president and managing director of Meta India (formerly Facebook India) and the chief executive officer of Star India's streaming media platform Hotstar. Mohan was a consultant for the firms Arthur D. Little and McKinsey & Company earlier in his career, and he was a member of the Internet and Mobile Association of India and the Museum of Art & Photography, among other organizations.

== Early life and education ==
Mohan was born in Kochi, Kerala. His father completed signals intelligence work for the Indian Air Force and fought in the Sino-Indian War. Mohan was raised in Eloor's Fertilisers and Chemicals Travancore Limited neighborhood. In 1993, at the age of 18, he received a scholarship and boarded his first flight to study in Singapore, where he earned a Bachelor of Applied Science degree in computer engineering from Nanyang Technological University. Mohan also earned a master's degree in international relations from the Paul H. Nitze School of Advanced International Studies at Johns Hopkins University, and a Master of Business Administration degree in finance from the Wharton School of the University of Pennsylvania.

== Career ==
Mohan's career began at the international management consulting firm Arthur D. Little in 1997. He became a consultant at McKinsey & Company in 2005. According to Mint, he was based in the United States and focused on "media projects that required him to work closely with film and TV studios, production companies, children's entertainment companies, women's apparel and footwear, and online gaming". He returned to India as a fellow at McKinsey Global Institute (MGI) in 2008, and worked with clients that included the Ministry of Housing and Urban Affairs, the Planning Commission, and the International Center for Research on Women. He co-authored MGI's 2010 report "India's Urban Awakening: Building inclusive cities, sustaining economic growth", which addressed urbanization in India. Mohan also wrote The Wall Street Journal's Weekend Panorama column for India Real Time regularly, as of 2011.

In April 2012, Mohan joined the Star Network, where he held various roles including senior vice president and executive vice president. He became the head of its digital business in 2013, from where he launched the live sports platform Starsports.com and Star India's streaming media platform Hotstar in 2015, and was later named chief executive officer (CEO) in April 2016. According to Fortune India, Mohan "played an important role in Star India's foray into video streaming when Star Sports started to live stream the ICC World Twenty20 cricket tournament in 2014".

In September 2018, Mohan was named vice president and managing director of Facebook India, where he oversaw Facebook's Indian operations starting in January 2019. In 2020, Mohan appeared before the Parliament of India's Standing Committee on Information Technology, which was led by a member of the opposition Congress party, on behalf of Facebook India to discuss "safeguarding citizens' rights" and the "prevention of misuse of social/online news media platforms". In 2021, he was summoned by the Delhi Legislative Assembly's Peace and Harmony Committee to appear as a witness on behalf of Facebook India in connection with the 2020 Delhi riots. A representative of the Assembly said Mohan was asked to lend his expertise and provide recommendations in order to prevent similar incidents fueled by social media, and no "coercive action" was intended. According to The Hindu, Mohan told the Supreme Court "that he was well within his rights to remain silent" and "[did] not wish to be part of a highly polarised political debate". He "accused the Assembly of threatening him with 'breach of privilege' if he did not appear before the Committee to testify" and filed a plea, which was dismissed by the Supreme Court in July. Instead of Mohan, Facebook India's public policy director appeared before the Committee in November.

Following Facebook Inc.'s rebrand in 2021, Mohan worked at the same role at Meta India. He stepped down from the role as vice president and managing director of Facebook India Online Services Pvt Ltd, the Indian subsidiary of Meta Platforms in November 2022 to join rival Snap Inc. From January 2023, he will be succeeded in the role by Sandhya Devanathan (current vice president and managing director of Meta India).

=== Board service and recognition ===
Mohan was elected vice chairman of the Internet and Mobile Association of India in 2021. He has also been chairman of the organization's Entertainment Sub Committee. In 2021, Mohan became an advisory board member of the US–India Strategic Partnership Forum, an advocacy group based in Washington, D.C., which promotes "stronger US-India bilateral commercial and strategic ties". He is also a member of the Mobile Marketing Association and the Bangalore-based Museum of Art & Photography.

Writers for Fortune India have credited Mohan for leading Hotstar "to great success". Liz Shackleton of Screen Daily credited him for helping to build the platform into "India's biggest online video service". India Today ranked Mohan number 48 in a 2020 "power list" of 50 people who "[rise] above the ordinary in extraordinary times". The magazine called him a "leader in the country's social media domain" and credited him for doubling Facebook India's profit. In 2021, India Today included Mohan in a list of 50 "high and mighty" people, in which he was described as "arguably the czar of India's social media space".

== Personal life ==
Mohan lives in Singapore. Previously, he was based in New Delhi, as of 2011. His wife Radhika Bansal is a former publisher at Harvard Business Publishing who co-founded Swishlist.in, described by Mint as an "online rental company for women's designer brands". The couple have children.

Mohan collects art, enjoys cricket, and plays tennis. He is an angel investor in the audio over-the-top media service Headfone.

== Publications ==
- Shankhe, Shirish; Vittal, Ireena; Dobbs, Richard; Mohan, Ajit; Gulati, Ankur; Ablett, Jonathan; Gupta, Shirish; Kim, Alex; Paul, Sudipto; Sanghvi, Aditya; Sethy, Gurpreet (April 2010). "India's urban awakening: Building inclusive cities, sustaining economic growth" (PDF). McKinsey Global Institute.

== See also ==
- List of former employees of McKinsey & Company
- List of Johns Hopkins University people
- List of Wharton School alumni
