= Julian Day =

Julian Day may refer to:

- Julian day, a continuous sequential count of days since day 0 at the beginning of the Julian Period on Monday, January 1, 4713 BC, proleptic Julian calendar
- Julian C. Day (born 1952), American corporate executive
- Calendar Man, a DC Comics supervillain, whose real name is Julian Gregory Day
- Julian Day (artist), broadcaster, artist and composer
