= Nicastro (disambiguation) =

Nicastro may refer to:

- Nicastro, a town in the province of Catanzaro, in the Calabria region of southern Italy
- Francesco Nicastro (born 1991), Italian football forward
- Fredrik Wikström Nicastro, Svensk film producer and head of feature films at the production company Tre Vänner
- Michelle Nicastro (1960–2010), American actress and singer
- Nicholas Nicastro (born 1963), American author and film critic
- Roberto Nicastro (born 1964), Italian Chairman of the "Good Banks" and Group General Manager of Unicredit
- J. McIntyre Machinery, Ltd. v. Nicastro, a 2011 decision by the US Supreme Court about the exercise of court jurisdictions
