= Deepwater Horizon (film) =

2016 American disaster film

- Theatrical release poster
- Directed by: Peter Berg
- Screenplay by: Matthew Michael Carnahan; Matthew Sand
- Story by: Matthew Sand
- Based on: "Deepwater Horizon's Final Hours" by: David Barstow; David Rohde; Stephanie Saul
- Produced by: Lorenzo di Bonaventura; Mark Vahradian; Mark Wahlberg; Stephen Levinson; David Womark
- Starring: Mark Wahlberg; Kurt Russell; John Malkovich; Gina Rodriguez; Dylan O'Brien; Kate Hudson
- Cinematography: Enrique Chediak
- Edited by: Colby Parker Jr.; Gabriel Fleming
- Music by: Steve Jablonsky
- Production companies: Summit Entertainment; Participant Media; Di Bonaventura Pictures; Closest to the Hole Productions; Leverage Entertainment
- Distributed by: Lionsgate
- Release dates: September 13, 2016 (TIFF); September 30, 2016 (United States)
- Running time: 107 minutes
- Country: United States
- Language: English
- Budget: $156 million (gross); $110–120 million (net)
- Box office: $124.9 million

Deepwater Horizon is a 2016 American biographical disaster film based on the Deepwater Horizon explosion and oil spill in the Gulf of Mexico. Peter Berg directed it from a screenplay by Matthew Michael Carnahan and Matthew Sand. It stars Mark Wahlberg, Kurt Russell, John Malkovich, Gina Rodriguez, Dylan O'Brien, and Kate Hudson. It is adapted from "Deepwater Horizon's Final Hours", a December 25, 2010, article in The New York Times written by David Barstow, David Rohde, and Stephanie Saul.

Principal photography began on April 27, 2015, in New Orleans, Louisiana. The film premiered at the 2016 Toronto International Film Festival and was theatrically released by Lionsgate in the United States on September 30, 2016. It received generally positive reviews, but was a box-office bomb, grossing $124.9 million worldwide against a budget of $110 million, resulting in a loss of $60–112 million for the studio. The film was nominated for two Oscars at the 89th Academy Awards: Best Sound Editing and Best Visual Effects, and a BAFTA Award for Best Sound at the 70th British Academy Film Awards.

== Plot ==
On April 20, 2010, Deepwater Horizon, an oil drilling rig operated by private contractor Transocean, is set to complete drilling off the southern coast of Louisiana on behalf of BP. Chief Electronics Technician Michael "Mike" Williams and Offshore Installation Manager James "Mr. Jimmy" Harrell are surprised to learn that the workers assigned to test the integrity of recently completed cement work are being sent home early, without conducting a cement bond log (CBL), at the insistence of BP managers Donald Vidrine and Robert Kaluza.

While Mike prepares the drilling team, including Caleb Holloway, Shane Roshto, and Adam Weise, Harrell meets with Vidrine and persuades him to conduct a negative pressure test, which indicates the cement has not properly sealed the well from the high-pressure reservoir. Vidrine disputes the test finding and orders a second test. After concluding the second test was a success, Vidrine pressures senior toolpusher Jason Anderson to run more tests and orders the rig to remove the drilling mud and prepare the rig to move to its next job.

At first, the operation goes smoothly, but the cement job eventually fails, triggering a massive blowout that overpowers and kills Weise, Roshto, and the majority of the other drill team members. Holloway and Vidrine evacuate the floor.

A chain of equipment malfunctions and a failed attempt to seal the well ignites the oil, killing Anderson and the other tool pushers. Andrea Fleytas, the rig's Dynamic Position Operator, tries to alert the Coast Guard, only to be overruled by her superior, Captain Curt Kuchta, because the rig is not in any imminent danger, at least until the rig erupts in flames. Kuchta sends out his call for help. With oil now spewing into the ocean, an oil-covered pelican flies into the bridge of a nearby vessel, the Damon Bankston, which was there to collect the drilling mud from the well, and dies; the vessel heads towards the rig just as the workers begin a frantic evacuation, sending out a rescue team after seeing the rig burst into flames. Harrell, still alive, although seriously injured in the explosion, is rescued by Mike and assumes control of the situation, only to discover that the rig cannot be saved. Aaron Dale Burkeen, a close friend of Mike's, sacrifices himself to keep a burning crane from collapsing onto the surviving crew. At the same time, Mike and Caleb rescue Vidrine and Kaluza and get them to safety.

As night falls and the burning oil lights up the area, the Coast Guard becomes aware of the incident and sends ships and aircraft to rescue the survivors, who are being ferried in the lifeboats to the Damon Bankston as it was already on scene to assist with the evacuation and rescue. With all the lifeboats full, Mike locates the emergency life raft, but it becomes separated from the rig before he and Andrea can board, causing the latter to suffer a panic attack. Just as the oil in the well itself ignites and destroys the rig, the two jump into the water and are picked up by rescuers, who then ferry them to the Damon Bankston, where the surviving crew mourn their lost crewmen and say the Lord's Prayer.

Returned home, the workers reunite with their families in a hotel lobby, during which the parents of one of the missing crew members accost Mike, resulting in him having a panic attack. Luckily, Mike's family rush in to comfort him.

Epilogue: Accompanied by clips showing the aftermath of the disaster, the real-life Mike Williams provides testimony which is televised on C-SPAN; he never went back to sea, and lives with his family in Texas. Andrea Fleytas quit the oil industry and lives in California. Jimmy Harrell continues to work for Transocean. Pictures of the eleven men who died aboard the Deepwater Horizon are shown. Kaluza and Vidrine were indicted for manslaughter, but by 2015, charges were dismissed.

"The blowout lasted for 87 days, spilling an estimated 210 million gallons of oil into the Gulf of Mexico. It was the worst oil disaster in U.S. history." –Closing caption

== Cast ==
- Mark Wahlberg as Mike Williams
- Kurt Russell as Jimmy "Mr. Jimmy" Harrell
- John Malkovich as Donald Vidrine
- Gina Rodriguez as Andrea Fleytas
- Dylan O'Brien as Caleb Holloway
- Kate Hudson as Felicia Williams
- Ethan Suplee as Jason Anderson
- Trace Adkins as Massive Man, a grieving father in hotel
- Brad Leland as Robert Kaluza
- Joe Chrest as David Sims
- James DuMont as Patrick O'Bryan
- Dave Maldonado as Captain Curt Kuchta
- Douglas M. Griffin as Alwin Landry
- Juston Street as Anthony Gervasio
- J. D. Evermore as Dewey Revette
- Jason Pine as Stephen Curtis
- Jason Kirkpatrick as Dale Burkeen
- Johnathan Angel as Gordon Jones
- Jeremy Sande as Adam Weise
- Henry Frost as Shane Roshto

== Production ==
=== Development and writing ===
On March 8, 2011, it was announced that Summit Entertainment, Participant Media, and Image Nation had acquired the film rights to The New York Times' article "Deepwater Horizon's Final Hours", written by David Barstow, David S. Rohde, and Stephanie Saul, and published on December 25, 2010, about the 2010 Deepwater Horizon explosion and subsequent oil spill. Matthew Sand was set to write the screenplay, while Lorenzo di Bonaventura was in talks to produce the film under his Di Bonaventura Pictures banner. Summit and Participant Media/Imagination would also finance the film. On acquiring the article to develop into a film, the president of Participant Media, Ricky Strauss said,

This is a perfect fit for us–a suspenseful and inspiring real-life account of everyday people whose values are tested in the face of an impending environmental disaster.

On July 24, 2012, Ric Roman Waugh was in talks with the studios to direct the film, Mark Vahradian was set to produce the film along with Bonaventura, and Lions Gate Entertainment also joined the project to produce and distribute. On July 11, 2014, it was announced that All Is Lost's director J. C. Chandor had been hired to direct the film; the screenplay's first draft was written by Sand, while Matthew Michael Carnahan wrote the second draft. In early October, it was confirmed that Summit would distribute the film, not Lionsgate. On January 30, 2015, it was reported that Lone Survivor director Peter Berg had replaced Chandor, and would re-team with Wahlberg on the film. Chandor exited due to creative differences.

=== Casting ===
On August 19, 2014, casting began, with actor Mark Wahlberg added in the lead role of the film. Wahlberg plays Mike Williams, a real-life electronics technician on the Deepwater Horizon oil rig. On March 18, 2015, Gina Rodriguez was set to play a woman named Andrea Fleytas, who was on the bridge on board the Deepwater Horizon at the time of the blowout, and frantically tried to contact the Coast Guard. On April 10, 2015, Deadline reported that Dylan O'Brien was in talks to play Caleb Holloway. Kurt Russell joined the film on the same day O'Brien was in talks. Soon after, John Malkovich was confirmed cast, as a BP representative who fatally underestimates the dangers of working on the rig. Kate Hudson was announced as a cast member in May 2015, and playing the wife of Wahlberg's character; her role was her first on-screen pairing with Russell, her stepfather, although they shared no dialogue in the film, only a hug.

=== Filming ===
Principal photography on the film began on April 27, 2015. It was officially announced by Lionsgate on May 18, 2015, that filming had begun in New Orleans, Louisiana. Production designer Chris Seagers built a 70 ft (21m) tall, 85% scale version of the Deepwater Horizon rig in the parking lot of the abandoned Six Flags New Orleans park. The set included a functional helipad and elevators. Beneath it was a tank filled with two million gallons of water, simulating the Gulf of Mexico.

The film cost a total of $156 million to produce, with $122 million spent in Louisiana. As a result, Lionsgate (the studio financing the film) received a $37.7 million subsidy from the state, under Louisiana's film incentive program. Later estimates put the production cost at $110 million.

== Release ==
Deepwater Horizon had its world premiere at the Toronto International Film Festival, on September 13, where it received a standing ovation from audiences after the screening. It opened in theaters on September 30, 2016, distributed by Summit Entertainment in the United States and Canada, and by Lionsgate Entertainment internationally.

== Reception ==
=== Box office ===
Deepwater Horizon grossed $61.4 million in the United States and Canada and $63.5 million in other territories for a worldwide total of $124.9 million, against a net production budget of around $110 million. The Hollywood Reporter judged it one of 2016's fourteen biggest box-office bombs.

In the United States and Canada, Deepwater Horizon was projected to gross $16–20 million from 3,259 theaters in its opening weekend, although some publications noted Wahlberg's films tend to outperform box office projections. The film made $860,000 from its Thursday night previews at 2,400 theaters, and $7.1 million on its first day. In total, the film earned $20.2 million during its opening weekend, debuting at number two at the box office behind Tim Burton's Miss Peregrine's Home for Peculiar Children. The film was released at a time when the marketplace was already dominated by two other adult-skewing pictures, The Magnificent Seven and Sully. The film over-performed in the Gulf Coast region, and also did well in IMAX, which earned $2.7 million of the film's total opening weekend.

The film's opening weekend was regarded as underwhelming and a disappointment, given its hefty production budget, but dramas released during the fall, and Wahlberg's films, tend to have box office legs. Forbes called the opening "good, but not great", especially considering the solid reviews. While most adult-skewing films would generally be made on a conservative budget in order to protect themselves financially, Deepwater Horizon was produced for $110–120 million (after tax rebates). Box office analyst Jeff Block said the film was "a hard sell. This should have been a $60 million film. The budget was out of control." Recent real-life drama films such as Sully ($60 million budget), Bridge of Spies ($40 million) and Captain Phillips ($55 million) were made for more moderate amounts. The Hollywood Reporter noted that when Hollywood spends north of $100 million on a film, it is intended for a much broader audience, but that was not the case for Deepwater Horizon, as the main demographics were adults, with 67% of the total ticket buyers during its opening weekend being over the age of 35. Another possible reason for the film's mediocre debut was its marketing miss, which was also a subject of criticism; from the outset, Lionsgate marketed the film as a heroic tale versus an issues-oriented movie. The name "Deepwater Horizon" itself is more associated with the aftermath of the spill than the heroics of the men who survived and helped their fellow workers. The Hollywood Reporter estimated the film lost at least $60 million, when factoring together all expenses and revenues.

Outside North America, Deepwater Horizon opened simultaneously in 52 markets, and grossed $12.4 million, of which IMAX made up $1 million 119 IMAX screens. The U.K. was the top earning market, with $2.6 million, followed by the Middle East ($1.5 million), Taiwan ($1.4 million), Australia ($1.3 million), and Russia ($1.2 million). In China, the film opened on Tuesday, November 15, where it delivered a six-day opening weekend of $7.9 million, debuting in third place, behind local film I Am Not Madame Bovary and the continuation of Doctor Strange. The next major markets to open were Germany (November 24) and Spain (November 25).

=== Critical response ===
Deepwater Horizon received generally positive reviews from critics. On Rotten Tomatoes, the film has an approval rating of 82% based on 265 reviews with an average rating of 7.00/10. The site's critical consensus reads, "Deepwater Horizon makes effective use of its titular man-made disaster to deliver an uncommonly serious – yet still suitably gripping – action thriller." On Metacritic, the film has a score of 68 out of 100 based on 52 critics, indicating "generally favorable" reviews. Audiences polled by CinemaScore gave the film an average grade of "A−" on an A+ to F scale.

Todd McCarthy of The Hollywood Reporter gave the film a positive review, writing, "ruggedness and resilience counts for far more in the characterizations here than does nuance, and everyone delivers as required. From a craft and technical point of view, the film is all but seamless, a credit to the extra care taken to avoid a CGI look." Mike Ryan of Uproxx praised the film's performances and ability to make audiences angry at BP: "I'll be honest, I didn't think we needed a movie about this subject. I've changed my mind. And, if nothing else, I hope it gets people angry again, because the people who did this to our planet, and killed 11 people in the process, got off too easy." Benjamin Lee of The Guardian praised Berg's direction as "admirably, uncharacteristically restrained...[He] stages the action horribly well, capturing the panic and gruesome mayhem without the film ever feeling exploitative. It's spectacularly constructed, yet it doesn't forget about the loss of life, ensuring that, despite thin characterisation, the impact is felt."

Former crew members started their own crowd-funded documentary project before the film's release, out of frustration with factual liberties taken in the film script and in the media.

=== Accolades ===
Year	Award	Category	Nominee	Result	Ref.
2016	Teen Choice Awards	Choice AnTEENcipated Movie Actor	Dylan O'Brien	Won	
2017	National Board of Review	Spotlight Award	Mark Wahlberg and Peter Berg (also for Patriots Day)	Won	
2017	People's Choice Awards	Favorite Dramatic Movie	Deepwater Horizon	Nominated	
2017	Annie Awards	Outstanding Achievement, Animated Effects in a Live Action Production	Raul Essig, Mark Chataway, George Kuruvilla and Mihai Cioroba	Nominated	
2017	Visual Effects Society Awards	Outstanding Supporting Visual Effects in a Photoreal Feature	Craig Hammack, Petra Holtorf-Stratton, Jason Snell, John Galloway and Burt Dalton	Won	
2017	Visual Effects Society Awards	Outstanding Model in a Photoreal or Animated Project	Kelvin Lau, Jean Bolte, Kevin Sprout and Kim Vongbunyong	Won	
2017	British Academy Film Awards	Best Sound	Mike Prestwood Smith, Dror Mohar, Wylie Stateman and David Wyman	Nominated	
2017	Society of Camera Operators Awards	Camera Operator of the Year – Film	Jacques Jouffret	Nominated	
2017	MPSE Golden Reel Awards	Feature English Language – Effects/Foley	Wylie Stateman, Renée Tondelli, Gary Hecker, Rick Owens, Sylvain Lasseur, Dror Mohar and Kris Fenske	Nominated	
2017	Academy Awards	Best Sound Editing	Wylie Stateman and Renée Tondelli	Nominated	
2017	Academy Awards	Best Visual Effects	Craig Hammack, Jason Snell, Jason Billington and Burt Dalton	Nominated	
2017	AACTA Awards (7th)	Best Visual Effects or Animation	Jason Billington, James Whitlam, Linda Luong	Nominated	

== Historical accuracy ==
The film was praised for staying "remarkably close" to the actual events, though it did take some artistic liberties and did a poor job explaining why the blowout occurred.

The movie opens with Mike Williams' daughter working on a science project and asking for a fossil. Later in the film, Williams gives his daughter a fossilised dinosaur tooth. In real life this never happened and was made up to help explain how the explosion occurred.

Throughout the first half of the movie, gas is seen rupturing and coming out of the concrete at the sea floor; this did not happen.

In the movie, Donald Vidrine (the BP manager of the rig) disregards the first negative pressure test (saying it was the result of the "bladder effect") and then overrules Transocean after the second test. Actually, Vidrine was confused after the first test and contacted several supervisors and on-shore engineers for other opinions. After the second test, the bladder effect was brought up by a Transocean crew member.

In the movie, Williams calls his wife and while in the call he hears the engines revving and his wife sees the lights getting brighter. In real life, he had just hung up when these things happened.

The movie depicts Jimmy Harrell manually triggering the blind shear ram from the bridge in an attempt to seal the well. In reality, the blind shear ram was automatically operated by a dead man's switch after the initial explosion severed power & communication lines to the BOP; however, it failed to seal the well due to differential pressure causing the drill pipe to buckle beyond the reach of the shear.

The lifeboats did actually leave Mike Williams, Andrea Fleytas and seven others on the rig. However, only Williams jumped off the rig. Fleytas jumped onto the life-raft that was deployed to save the remaining seven people.
