= Theneeds =

Online and mobile search engine

- Type: Private
- Industry: Internet; Consumer internet Computer software
- Genre: Content discovery Personalized discovery
- Founded: 2013
- Headquarters: San Francisco, California, US
- Area served: Worldwide
- Key people: Gabriele Pansa; Emanuele Cesena, PhD; Luca Albertalli
- Products: Web; Mobile web iPhone app
- Owner: Shopkick
- Website: www.theneeds.com

Theneeds is a search engine that features content tailored to users' interests, such as articles, news, videos, social posts, and other media.

Based in San Francisco, California, the company was founded in 2013 by former Accenture executives Gabriele Pansa and Luca Albertalli, together with former CS researcher and PhD Emanuele Cesena.

In early 2016, Shopkick, the most used real-world shopping app according to Nielsen, acquired the technology and team of Theneeds to support the company's personalization efforts.

== History ==
The company was incorporated in the US in 2013 as Theneeds, Inc. by Gabriele Pansa as co-founder and CEO.

Theneeds’ website launched in Beta late 2013 and the company later released also its first mobile application for iPhone in March 2014.

In September 2014 the company surpassed 10 million pieces of content delivered by its proprietary discovery engine and in October 2014 announced the release of a major improvement of its content recommendation technology.

Early 2016, Shopkick acquired Theneeds to support the company personalization efforts.

== Service ==
Theneeds was designed to help users discover Internet content matching their interests, including news sites, blogs, and social networks, and uses an algorithm to match content to users' interests more closely the more they use it.

== Technology ==
Theneeds’ proprietary technology is built using a mix of artificial intelligence and social signals. Theneeds creates specific thematic channels by collecting and analyzing web content, and employing Theneeds’ content relational graph along with proprietary and public social signals in order to rank and distill content. Through real-time user behavior analysis, Theneeds constantly maps the interests of each user to deliver personalized experiences and simplify content discovery.
