= Martin Roll =

Danish management consultant (born 1967)

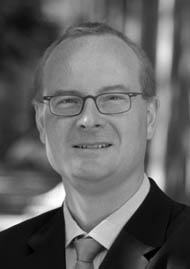
- Born: Copenhagen, Denmark; 2 March 1967 (age 59)
- Education: INSEAD (MBA); Copenhagen Business School
- Occupations: Business and brand strategist Founder and CEO, Martin Roll Company
- Website: Official website

Martin Roll (born 2 March 1967) is a Danish author, brand strategist and management consultant. He has appeared as a commentator in international television and print media.

Rolls holds an MBA from INSEAD, where he is a Distinguished Fellow and Entrepreneur in Residence. His first book, Asian Brand Strategy, was selected as one of Strategy+Business magazine "Best Business Books: Marketing" in 2006.

He is the founder and CEO of Martin Roll Company, an advisory firm based in Singapore. He advises Fortune 500 companies, Asian firms, and family-owned businesses. He has also served as a senior advisor to McKinsey & Company.

== Early life and education ==
Roll received a bachelor's degree in business and marketing management from Copenhagen Business School in 1989. He attended Young Managers Program in 1998 and completed his MBA from INSEAD in 1999.

== Career ==
After completing his bachelor's degree in 1989, he worked in marketing and advertising firms including Bates and DDB Worldwide, handling global accounts like Ericsson and McDonald's.

In 2000, he took on the role as chief marketing officer (CMO) with a Danish tech company, whose regional headquarters was in Singapore. Martin Roll founded his own management consulting business in 2002 aimed at helping companies to build their global brands. He advises Fortune 500 companies, Asian firms and family-owned businesses on strategy, leadership, branding and marketing.

Roll was appointed as Senior Adviser to the global public relations firm, Burson-Marsteller in December 2011.

In October 2017, he was appointed as Senior Advisor at Singapore based venture capital firm, Cocoon Capital. He is an Associate fellow with the Institute on Asian Consumer Insight (ACI). Martin Roll was appointed Senior Advisor to freelance-based agency Superson in March 2019.

Roll has served as Senior Advisor at McKinsey & Company.

== Publications ==
In 2005, Martin authored his first book Asian Brand Strategy: How Asia Builds Strong Brands, published by Palgrave Macmillan. Asian Brand Strategy is regarded as one of the best books written on Asian branding strategy and was rated a top global marketing book of 2006 by Strategy+Business.

Professor John Quelch at Harvard Business School called it, "An important handbook for Asian executives aspiring to build strong brands. It provides a solid foundation for future success in the global marketplace."

The Daily Telegraph in its book review wrote, "In Asian Brand Strategy, he [Martin] sets out 10 ways to create an Asian brand in a marketplace that in the past has often dismissed image as unimportant."

In a review of the book, Dominic Barton from McKinsey & Company said, "Martin Roll provides a compelling and practical roadmap on how to do this based on his extensive experience advising Asian corporations."

Martin Roll co-authored the book, The Future of Branding in 2016 together with a team of global business and marketing academics including Kevin Lane Keller, Don E. Schultz and Rajendra K. Srivastava.

Martin Roll is a business columnist with Harvard Business Review and INSEAD Knowledge.

== Public speaking ==
Martin Roll is a frequent keynote speaker and EMCEE at international conferences on business and brand strategy with a focus on Asian brands, global strategy and leadership. He has spoken at business events like Thinkers50, Women's Forum for the Economy and Society, Arab Luxury World, TEDx, World Knowledge Forum, The Harvard Project for Asian and International Relations (HPAIR), Strategy Summit and Global Leaders Summit, PowerBrands Glam Las Vegas.

== Academic ==
Roll teaches MBA, EMBA and Executive Education programmes at Nanyang Business School. He also lectures at INSEAD, CEIBS and ESSEC.

== Bibliography ==
- Roll, Martin (2006). Asian Brand Strategy: How Asia Builds Strong Brands. United Kingdom: Palgrave Macmillan UK. ISBN 978-1-4039-9279-6.
- Roll, Martin (2015). Asian Brand Strategy (Revised and Updated): Building and Sustaining Strong Global Brands in Asia. United Kingdom: Palgrave Macmillan UK. ISBN 978-1-349-67574-6.
- Roll, Martin (2016). "Branding and Emerging Markets". The Future of Branding. United Kingdom: SAGE Publishing. ISBN 978-9-3515-0316-3.

== Personal life ==
He is a Danish citizen and a Permanent resident of Singapore. He currently splits his time between Copenhagen and Singapore. In an interview with China Daily, Roll said he spent about 250 days a year travelling globally on client engagements and keynote speeches.
