= Sandhya Devanathan =

Indian technology executive

- Born: 1977 (age 48–49)
- Education: Andhra University (BTech); FMS Delhi (MBA)
- Occupation: Business executive
- Employer(s): Meta Platforms (2016–2026); OpenAI (2026–)

Sandhya Devanathan is a former banker and business executive from Andhra Pradesh, India. She has served as Vice President and Managing Director of Meta (owner of social media platforms like Facebook, Instagram, WhatsApp, Messenger, and Threads) from 2018 to 2025. In 2025, she took over additional duties, overseeing Meta's Southeast Asia operations, replacing Benjamin Joe. In 2026, she is set to join an artificial intelligence company, OpenAI as Vice President for Southeast Asia and Australia.

== Education ==
Devanathan was born and brought up in Visakhapatnam, Andra Pradesh, India. She completed her lower education at the St. Francis De Sales (S.F.S.) School in Seethammadhara, adjoining Visakhapatnam. In 1994, Devanathan entered Andhra University College of Engineering and completed her chemical engineering (BTech) degree in 1998. At the university, she also completed L2 computer programme course. In 1998, she moved to Delhi and enrolled in the Faculty of Management Studies – University of Delhi (FMS Delhi) from where she earned her MBA degree in 2000. In 2014, she completed a course in leadership at the Saïd Business School of the University of Oxford.

== Career ==
After finishing her MBA, Devanathan worked at Citibank as Webmaster and Product Manager. Between 2000 and 2009, she hold various positions in India, the Philippines and US. In December 2009, she moved to Singapore to work at Standard Chartered.

In January 2016, Devanathan Joined Facebook (renamed Meta in 2021) company as the Group Director of South East Asia of Ecommerce, Travel, and Finserv. In August 2016, she made a shift within the company to a newly created role of Country Managing Director for Singapore and Vietnam. On top of that, in 2018 she additionally took on the role of Business Head of Vietnam. During her nearly five years' tenure, she led under the supervision of Kenneth Bishop, who moved to Juul in 2020. In April 2020, Devanathan became the new Vice President of Gaming in the Asia Pacific region and moved to Indonesia. She also became the global lead for Play Forward, Meta's programme for improving diversity in gaming.

While in this role, during an interview with CNBC, Devanathan said that a large part of the female gaming market was being overlooked, therefore profits were a fraction of what they could be. She said, "Women now comprise nearly half of the gaming industry and games need to reflect that growing diversity." She also added, "The gaming industry should reflect the growing diversity of its demographics if it wants to succeed."

In November 2022, amid mass layoffs of over 11,000 employees, she took up the vacant position, which had been previously left vacant by Ajit Mohan. Other senior staff leaving the company included the former WhatsApp Head for India, Abhijit Bose.

In January 2023, Devanathan was appointed Head and Vice President of Meta India, replacing Ajit Mohan, who had joined Snap. In 2024, she announced partnership with ONDC, aimed at democratizing commerce for the greater majority of Indians. The same year, she made partnership with the Press Trust of India (PTI ) for a better fact-checking system in India.

In May 2025, Devanathan was announced to take on responsibilities for Southeast Asia on top of her India obligations. In August 2026, she announced departure from Meta and acceptance the position of Vice President for Southeast Asia and Australia for the American artificial intelligence company, OpenAI. She will be based in Singapore.

== Philanthropy and corporate activities ==
In 2013, Devanathan became a mentor for UN Women on Project Inspire. She had been appointed member of USIBC Global Board, board of the National Library of Singapore, a board observer at Jio Platforms, and a national steerco member of the Federation of Indian Chambers of Commerce and Industry (FICCI). Within Meta, she has served as the Coach of the Leap Leadership Program for Women in FB (Meta) since January 2018. She is also on the Global Diversity Equity Council within Meta, and is the current Executive Sponsor for Women in APAC region.

Devanathan started the STEM program for Singaporean school girls with UN Women (now called Girls2Pioneers), and was co-chair of the Women's Council at Standard Chartered. She is also on the advisory council of the Women's Forum for Economy & Society in Asia. In 2018, she was a panel member of the "The Face of Leadership and Strength of Diversity" programme of the University of Oxford held in Singapore.

== Honours and awards ==
In 2017, Devanathan was awarded The Asian Banker Promising Young Banker for Asia Pacific.

Devanathan has been listed in three consecutive years in the Fortune India's "Most Powerful Women"; in 2023 at number 47, in 2024 and 2025, at number 27. She was also listed in the "50 Most Influential Women of the Year" by Impact magazine at 9th position in 2023 and 1st in 2024.

In 2024, Devanathan was placed as the 95th Most Powerful Woman in Asia by Fortune Asia. In 2024, Devanathan was honored in her hometown of Visakhapatnam, Andhra Pradesh, by the Vizagapatam Chamber of Commerce and Industry (VCCI).
