= Shopkick =

American shopping app company

- Type: Subsidiary
- Industry: Media
- Founded: 2009; 17 years ago
- Founders: Cyriac Roeding; Jeff Sellinger; Aaron Emigh
- Defunct: March 27, 2026
- Headquarters: Denver, Colorado
- Parent: Trax Retail
- Website: shopkick.com

Shopkick was an American company based in Denver that created a shopping app for smartphones and tablets offering users rewards for shopping activities on both online and offline platforms such as walking into stores, scanning items, making in-app or in-store purchases and submitting receipts. Users are awarded "kicks" for these actions, and can exchange them for rewards in the form of mobile gift cards. The app is not currently available for iOS and Android devices.

== History ==
Shopkick, currently based in Denver, Colorado was co-founded by Cyriac Roeding, Jeff Sellinger, and Aaron Emigh in 2009 and has investors that include venture capital firm Kleiner Perkins Caufield & Byers, as well as Reid Hoffman (co-founder of LinkedIn Corp) and Greylock Partners. The company raised over $20 million in venture funding before being purchased by SK Planet.

CEO Cyriac Roeding, founder and EVP of CBS's mobile unit, created the concept of rewards for walking into stores while an entrepreneur-in-residence at Kleiner Perkins.

The Shopkick app was released in August 2010, initially with five national retail partners on board: Macy's, Best Buy, Sports Authority and American Eagle Outfitters, and the Simon Property Group.

In October 2014, Shopkick was acquired by SK planet, subsidiary of SK Telecom, the largest telecommunication carrier in Korea, which is also a part of SK Group, a Fortune 100 company. In early 2016, Shopkick acquired the technology and team of Theneeds.

In April 2017, Shopkick launched Shopkick Grocery, a product that lets users earn more "rewards" on their grocery shopping. New products included branded video, list-building, branded content integrations, and "kicks" for receipts.

In August 2017 Shopkick launched Mobile Shopping with partners like eBay, Groupon, Apple, Boxed and Jet.com. Users can now get rewarded for browsing and making purchases online as well as in stores. "This is an opportunity to get in front of a captive audience that wouldn't necessarily be native to us—this is a new audience for us," said Marie Langhout-Franklin, head of partner marketing at eBay.

In July 2019, Israeli company Trax announced that it had acquired Shopkick.

On March 27, 2026, word started making the rounds on social media that Shopkick had been shut down, with employees notified in the hours leading up to the shutdown, while users were given no warning.

== Products ==
Kicks can be redeemed for various rewards such as gift cards to places like Target, Walmart, and Starbucks as well as donations to charities such as Feeding America and the American Red cross. Most reward denominations start at $2 for various retailers such as TJ Maxx and American Eagle. Shopkick also aggregates deals, sales, and coupons from local brands and retailers for users. Partner stores currently include Best Buy, American Eagle Outfitters, Torrid, Marshalls, Yankee Candle, TJ Maxx. Over time, product kicks have been offered by major brands including P&G, Unilever, Mondelez, and L'Oreal.

Shopkick's business model is pay-for-performance, with partners working with the company to determine their specific ROI – like in-app content views, products scanned or sold. Shopkick only earns money when the action is completed.

As of April 2017, Shopkick had driven over 200 million store visits, over 270 million product scans in aisle, and over $2.5 billion in total sales from brand and retail partners.

== Technology ==
Shopkick does not rely solely on GPS triangulation. Instead, Shopkick uses an inaudible audio signal, unique to each store, which can be detected by smartphone users who have the Shopkick app installed, when the app is open. Once a Shopkick signal is detected, the app delivers reward points called "kicks" to the user for walking into a retail store, trying on clothes, scanning a barcode and other actions. The audio signal is broadcast through a small transmitter in the store. Shopkick also rolled out a Bluetooth Low Energy (BLE) in-store presence solution (Apple iBeacon-compatible) in its audio/iBeacon hybrid, called shopBeacon.

== Awards and accolades ==
- World Economic Forum, Tech Pioneer 2013
- The Wall Street Journal, Top 10 Apps of 2010
- Fast Company, World's 10 Most Innovative Companies in Retail
- Mashable, Top 10 Apps to Watch in 2011
