= SK Planet =

Internet platform development company

SK Planet Co., Ltd. 에스케이 플래닛
- Company type: Subsidiary
- Industry: Internet: E-Commerce; O2O Services; Digital Advertising
- Founded: October 1, 2011
- Headquarters: Pangyo, Gyeonggi Province, South Korea
- Key people: SungWon Suh (CEO)
- Products: E-Commerce; Online-to-Offline; Digital Marketing; Mobile Commerce; 11st.co.kr; OK Cashbag; Syrup; Shopkick
- Number of employees: 2,283
- Parent: SK Telecom
- Website: www.skplanet.com

SK Planet Co., Ltd. (Hangul: SK 플래닛 or 에스케이 플래닛), a subsidiary of SK Telecom, was established in 2011. It is an internet platform development company, with operations in eight countries. SK Planet was spun off from SK Telecom to focus on online services and has since evolved to concentrate on three core business areas: e-Commerce, Online-to-Offline services, and digital marketing.

== Products and Business Services ==
Since its inception, SK Planet has owned, operated, and developed a variety of digital products and services, including those related to business, entertainment, financial technology, social media platforms, mobile messaging, location-based services, mobile commerce, and marketing.

E-Commerce

SK Planet owns and operates 11st.co.kr – an e-Commerce shopping website in South Korea. Here, online buyers can purchase goods and services from sellers through its online marketplace platform. As of 2016, 11st.co.kr became South Korea's highest number of monthly unique visitors among mobile shopping apps in Korea. SK Planet then expanded 11st.co.kr into new international markets, with its first global venture being N11.com in Turkey in 2013. Subsequent expansions included Elevenia in Indonesia in 2014, 11street Malaysia in 2015, and 11street Thailand in 2017.

Online-to-Offline Services

OK Cashbag is South Korea's most widely used integrated loyalty program, allowing customers to earn points across various retailers and redeem those points for goods, services, and discounts at over 60,000 merchants. It boasts 38 million subscribers on its marketing platform.

Syrup is a singular brand of multiple consumer mobile apps in South Korea specializing in online-to-offline services, including:

- Gifticon: Launched in 2006 as Korea's first mobile voucher service, enabling users to purchase digital vouchers and send them as gifts, which can then be redeemed at the point of sale.
- Syrup Wallet: A mobile wallet service using BLE and geo-fencing technology to provide users with membership promotions and discounts from over 400 brands, and also serves as a digital wallet for membership cards.
- Syrup Table: A mobile app focusing on food and beverage establishments, providing crowd-sourced reviews about local restaurants, nearby promotions and discounts, as well as pre-ordering services.
- Syrup Style: A curated fashion app.
- Syrup Pay: A web-based payment solution where users register their payment preferences, such as credit card, bank transfer, or mobile carrier billing, to pay for their purchases and then enter a passcode to complete transactions.

In November 2024 SK Planet announced a cooperation with Animoca Brands Mocaverse to introduce blockchain innovations into SK Planet's existing digital services ecosystem, enhancing the user experience with decentralized features.

== International Markets ==
=== United States ===
SK Planet Inc. is the operational entity located in San Francisco, California. In 2014, SK Planet acquired Shopkick Inc. for $200 million, a mobile shopping companion that informs and rewards customers with points for walking into participating stores which can be redeemed for discounts.

=== China ===
SK Planet launched an e-Commerce website offering products from Korea, as well as their O2O service Syrup Style in China.

=== Japan ===
SK Planet owns and operates Cotoco under SK Planet Japan, a mobile gifting application where users can purchase and send gift vouchers from participating vendors and retailers.

=== Turkey ===
SK Planet deployed its first e-Commerce venture, n11.com, in Turkey in 2013 through a joint-venture with Doğuş Group under Doğuş Planet.

=== Indonesia ===
SK Planet established elevenia, an e-Commerce marketplace in Indonesia through a joint-venture with XL-Axiata in 2014. Elevenia is owned and operated under XL Planet. Both joint-venture partners have recently placed a Series-B investment of US$50 million, to further support the growing e-Commerce venture.

=== Malaysia ===
11street Malaysia is an e-Commerce marketplace owned and operated by Celcom Planet, which was launched in 2015 as a joint-venture between Celcom Axiata and SK Planet. Rising Korean actor Lee Min-Ho became a brand ambassador for 11street Malaysia during its launch campaign.

=== Thailand ===
SK Planet launched its fifth e-Commerce venture in Thailand as a wholly owned subsidiary, known as 11street Thailand. The official launch included a large marketing campaign, with the Korean Actor Song Joong-Ki and rising Thai actress Mew Nittha as brand ambassadors.
