= Aditya Julka =

Indian businessman

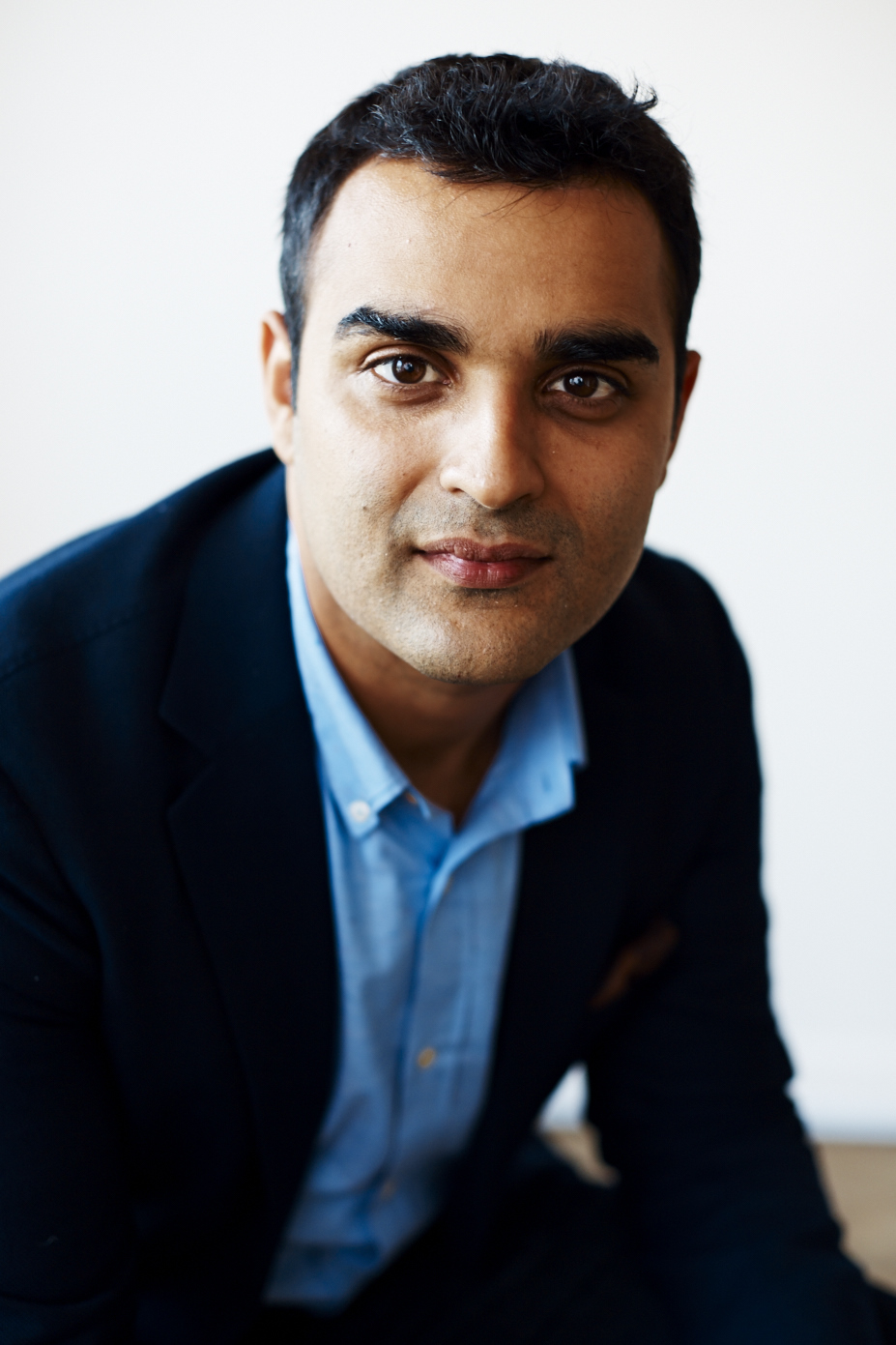
- Born: August 24, 1981 (age 45)
- Education: IIT Delhi

Aditya Julka (born August 24, 1981) is the co-founder and former CEO of Paddle8, an online auction house for fine art and collectibles. In July 2016, Paddle8 announced a merger with Auctionata, with Julka serving as the chief strategy officer for the joint company. Julka previously founded InBioPro (a biochemical company based in Bangalore, India) and BioAtlantis (a biotechnology company based in Ireland).

== Early life and education ==
Julka received his graduate and undergraduate degrees in biochemical engineering from the Indian Institute of Technology Delhi, where he was given the Director's Gold Medal. He received his MBA from Harvard Business School, where he was a Baker Scholar as well as an Entrepreneur in Residence.

== Career ==
In his twenties Julka was co-founder of two biotech companies. His last company, which was supported by Accel-Ventures, was sold to a publicly listed company in 2010. From 2009 to 2011 Julka was Associate at McKinsey & Company. He was a member of the advisory board of Performa, the New York Biennial for Performance Art, and of Khoj, an organization dedicated to performance art in South Asia. In 2016, Julka was named to the class of the New York Venture Fellows, a year-long program designed to help entrepreneurs scale their ventures. He has also been recognized in Crain's New York Business List of 40 Under 40, the Art+Auction Power 100 List, Apollo Magazine's List of 40 Under 40, and has spoken at Northside Festival, DLD New York, Techcrunch TV and TEDxChelsea.

Julka serves on the board of Performa, New York's art biennial, and the advisory board of Khoj, an organization dedicated to performance art in South Asia. Julka was co-founder, CEO and chairman of Paddle8, which was sold to Auctionata in 2016, making it the world's largest online auction house. In March 2020 the online Auction House Paddle8 filed for bankruptcy.

Julka co-founded Syllable in 2017 with Colin Peek. Syllable’s brands include InBloom, co-founded by Kate Hudson, and Loops, partnering with Camila Mendes.

Julka, along with Arjun Ghose, Rahul Pagdipati, and Kanu Gupta founded Veera, a mobile-only web browser for users in India with their largest claim being their browsing speed, clocking in at 40.8 runs/minute on Speedometer.
