= Jason Billington =

Australian Visual Effects Supervisor

Jason Billington is an Australian Visual Effects Supervisor known for his works in films, Transformers (2007), Pirates of the Caribbean: At World's End (2007), Transformers (2007-14), Indiana Jones and the Kingdom of the Crystal Skull (2008), WALL-E (2008), Star Trek (2009), Avatar (2009), Mission: Impossible – Ghost Protocol (2011), Battleship (2012), Pacific Rim (2013), Jurassic World (2015) and Deepwater Horizon (2016). He worked as a digital lead artist for Disney's visual effects company Industrial Light & Magic (ILM).

For Deepwater Horizon, he received critical acclaim and an Academy Award for Best Visual Effects nomination at 89th Academy Awards.
