= Kathleen Hogan =

American business executive

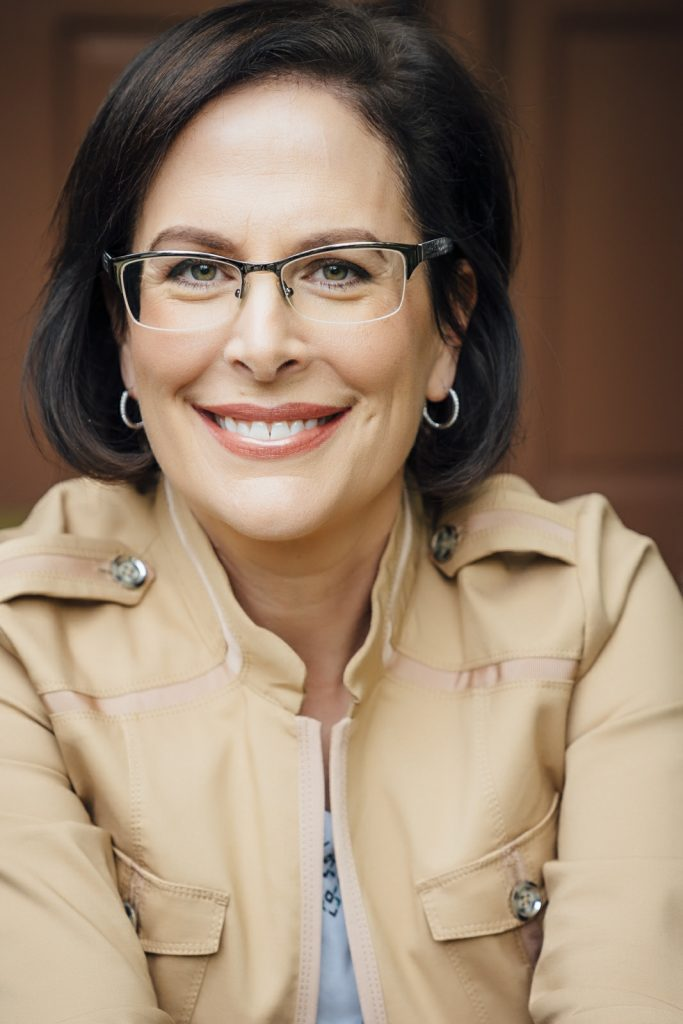
- Hogan in 2016
- Born: Wisconsin
- Education: Harvard University (B.A.) Stanford University (M.B.A.)
- Occupation(s): Executive Vice President of Strategy and Transformation
- Employer: Microsoft

Kathleen Hogan is executive vice president of strategy and transformation at Microsoft. Prior to this move, in March 2025, she had been chief people officer at Microsoft since 2015.

== Education and early career ==
Hogan graduated Harvard University in 1988 with a bachelor's degree in applied mathematics and economics.

In 1994, she earned an MBA from Stanford Graduate School of Business.

In between her time at university, she worked for Oracle Corporation, until 1992, first as a software developer, then as a software development manager.

After graduating from Stanford Graduate School of Business, she worked as a management consultant for consulting firm McKinsey & Company until 2003.

== Microsoft ==
Microsoft was one of Hogan's clients at McKinsey, and she was hired by Kevin Johnson at Microsoft in 2003. In 2005, she became the Corporate Vice President of Customer Service and Support. In 2009, she was promoted to Corporate Vice President of Microsoft Worldwide Services, which includes customer service, enterprise support, and consulting with 20,000+ employees. That year the Profiles in Diversity Journal put her on its annual "Women Worth Watching" list.

In November 2014, Hogan was appointed to executive vice president for Human Resources, replacing Lisa Brummel. Although Hogan had never worked in HR before, she says her experience in leading the Worldwide Services division focused on attracting and retaining the best talent. Her diverse combination of experience, in technical, sales, and service, gave her credibility within the company.

As chief people officer, her primary goal was to support the change in the company culture, led by new CEO Satya Nadella, from a "fixed mindset" of competition and trying to be the smartest person, to a "growth mindset" of learning, cooperation, diversity, and inclusion. The "mindset" methodology comes from the work of Stanford University psychology professor Carol Dweck. Dweck visited Microsoft in May 2016, met with Hogan and others, and was favorably impressed: unlike some other Fortune 500 companies that "give lip service to growth mind-set", Dweck said, "I could see that they understood it deeply." In October 2016, Dweck and Hogan wrote an article together for Harvard Business Review about how Microsoft uses growth mindset.

In 2014, as one of her first actions as chief people officer, Hogan met with human resource leads from rival companies, including Laszlo Bock from Google, and Denise Young Smith from Apple, Inc., to discuss the goal of increasing diversity in the technology industry. The collaborative meetings continued, including HR leads from Intel and Washington State companies outside the technology industry such as Starbucks and Costco. In further efforts to expand corporate diversity and inclusion, Hogan expanded parental leave benefit to all parents, including fathers, in 2015, and introduced a four-week paid family caregiver leave in 2017, making Microsoft one of the only companies to offer such a benefit worldwide. Hogan says these benefits are also personal for her, as she remembers the support she needed from her Services team when she was diagnosed with breast cancer in 2007.

== Boards and honors ==
Hogan serves on the boards of directors of the National Center for Women & Information Technology, which works to increase women's participation in computing, and of the Puget Sound region Susan G. Komen breast cancer organization. Hogan also joined the Board of Alaska Airlines in August 2019. She is a former executive board member of the Technology Services Industry Association.

In 2015, Hogan was recognized as a "Woman of Influence" by the Puget Sound Business Journal.

In 2016, she was named to the "Top 50 Most Powerful Women in Technology" list by Yahoo! and the National Diversity Council.

In 2021, Hogan was named "HR Executive of the Year" by Human Resource Executive magazine for her leadership and people strategy throughout the COVID-19 pandemic.

In 2022, she was inducted as a fellow of the National Academy of Human Resources.

== Personal life ==
Hogan was born and raised in southeast Wisconsin: Wauwatosa, Brookfield, and Pewaukee. She graduated from Brookfield Central High School in 1984. She has one son, born in 2002.
