= Stephanie Saul =

American journalist

- Education: University of Mississippi (BA)
- Occupation: Journalist
- Spouse: Walt Bogdanich
- Writing career
- Notable awards: Pulitzer Prize for Investigative Reporting (1995)

Stephanie Saul is an American journalist. She won the 1995 Pulitzer Prize for Investigative Reporting for her work at Newsday. She moved to The New York Times in 2005.

== Early life and education ==
Saul grew up in the city of New Albany, Mississippi, United States. In middle school, she wrote the "Snoop" column for the school newspaper. In high school, she was the editor for the school's newspaper, and graduated in 1972 as part of the first fully desegregated class in New Albany.

Saul entered the University of Mississippi for undergraduate studies in 1972, intending to pursue a medical career after graduation for better career opportunity. She took journalism classes along with her pre-med studies and served on the staff of the yearbook and the school newspaper, the Daily Mississippian. In 1975, she received a Bachelor of Arts degree with a major in journalism from the University of Mississippi. She was a member of Phi Kappa Phi.

== Career ==
Saul began her journalism career working for The Clarion-Ledger in Jackson, Mississippi, covering the state government and the state legislature. In 1980, Saul, fellow reporter Patrick Larking, and photographers Laura Lynn Fistler and Tom Hayes earned The Clarion-Ledger the Silver Gavel Award from the American Bar Association for their feature article on jail conditions in Mississippi. In 1981, Saul and W. Stevens Ricks received the George Polk Award for Regional Reporting for their article "Mississippi Gulf Coast: Wide Open and Wicked."

While working for The Plain Dealer, Saul, Mary Anne Sharkey, and W. Steve Ricks wrote a multi-part series in 1985 titled "A Law Unto Himself" that exposed the corrupt practices of Ohio Supreme Court Justice Frank Celebrezze. Fallout from the series led to his electoral defeat in 1986.

Saul joined Newsday in 1984 and was the paper's national reporter from 1994 to 2000. Together with Brian Donovan, she earned the 1995 Pulitzer Prize for Investigative Reporting "[for] their stories that revealed disability pension abuses by local police." Their investigation found a number of retired police officers in the state of New York receiving millions in disability payments for minor injuries.

Saul moved to The New York Times in 2005. Her article on the Deepwater Horizon disaster, co-authored with David Barstow and David Rohde, formed the basis for the 2016 film of the same name.

== Personal life ==
Saul and her husband, fellow Times reporter Walt Bogdanich, have two sons.
