= Leta Hong Fincher =

American journalist and writer

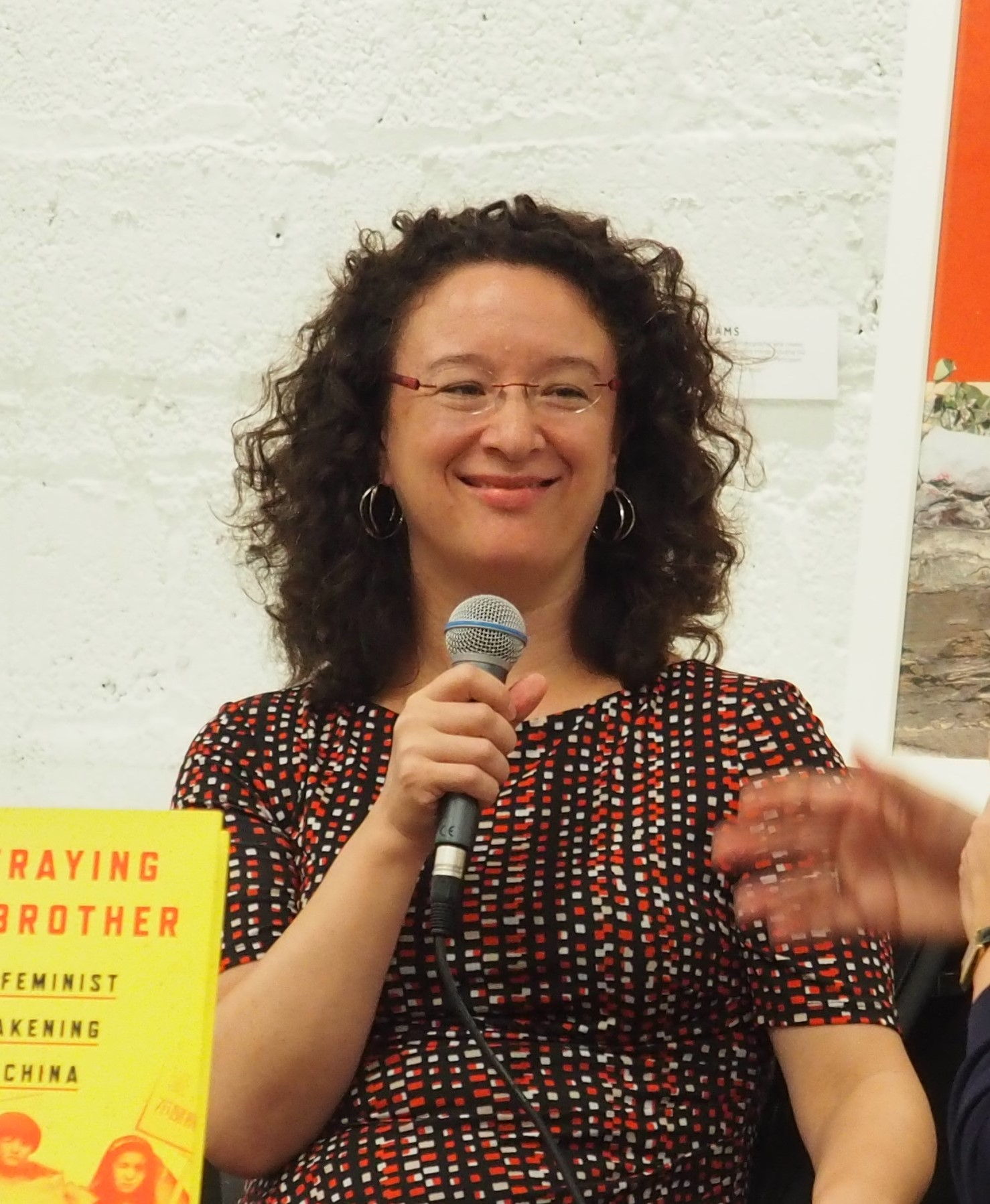
- Born: Hong Kong
- Other name: 洪理达
- Education: Harvard University (BA); Stanford University (MA); Tsinghua University (PhD)
- Occupation: Journalist
- Employer: Columbia University
- Spouse: Michael Forsythe
- Website: letahongfincher.com

Leta Hong Fincher is an American journalist, feminist and writer. She is currently a research associate at Columbia University's Weatherhead East Asian Institute.

== Early life and education ==
Fincher was born in British Hong Kong to a Chinese-American mother with roots in Xiamen, Fujian, and a European-American father. She grew up in Canberra after her parents received tenures at Australian National University. Her mother, a linguist, and her father, a historian, were both Chinese scholars, and she spent a significant portion of her childhood travelling to and from China. As a child, she spoke Mandarin at home with her mother.

Fincher attended Harvard University, where she completed her bachelor's degree in 1990, and later Stanford University for her master's degree in East Asian studies. She graduated from Tsinghua University with the first PhD for sociology awarded to an American.

== Career ==
Fincher has written for several publications about feminism, especially in China. For her reports on women and feminism in China, Fincher won the Society of Professional Journalists' Sigma Delta Chi award. She has worked at Radio Free Asia (1996–1997), Asia Television (1997–1998), CNBC Asia (1998–1999), and Voice of America (2000–2003 and 2004–2009), and she has written for The New York Times, The Washington Post and The Guardian.

== Personal life ==
She is married to New York Times reporter and author Michael Forsythe.

== Publications ==
- Leftover Women: The Resurgence of Gender Inequality in China, Zed Books, 2014. ISBN 978-1780329222 [5][6]
- Betraying Big Brother: The Feminist Awakening in China, Verso Books, 2018. ISBN 978-1786633644
