= Trax Retail =

Retail technology company

Trax
- Website Screenshot
- Company type: Private
- Founded: 2010
- Headquarters: Singapore
- Area served: Worldwide
- CEO: Gary Laben
- Key people: Joel Bar-El (Founder and Executive Chairman), Dror Feldheim (Founder and President)
- Industry: Software for Retail & CPG
- Website: traxretail.com
- Current status: Active

Trax is a technology company headquartered in Singapore, with offices throughout the Asia-Pacific, Europe, the Middle East, North America, and South America. Founded in 2010 by Joel Bar-El and Dror Feldheim, Trax has more than 150 customers in the retail and FMCG industries, including beverage company Coca-Cola and brewer Anheuser-Busch InBev. Customers use the company's computer vision technology to collect, measure, and analyze what's happening on physical store shelves. Trax's services are available in 45 markets.

Trax's development center opened in July 2012 in Tel Aviv. In 2015, the company opened its first two regional offices: London in January and São Paulo, Brazil, in April. In March 2016, Trax established its US headquarters in Atlanta, Georgia. The company opened two more regional offices in Shanghai and Mexico City in June and September 2016, respectively.

== Funding ==
Trax closed its first round of funding (seed round) for US$1.1 million in June 2011. In Aug 2013 it raised US$6.6 million in Series A financing, and US$15.7 million in February 2014 and US$15 million in December 2014 as part of its Series B round. In June 2016 and February 2017 the company raised US$40 million and US$19.5 million respectively as part of its Series C round, led by Broad Peak Investments. In July 2019, it raised $100 million in a series D round led by Chinese alternative asset manager Hopu Investments. In April 2021, it raised $650 million in a series E round led by SoftBank Vision Fund and BlackRock. In January 2024, Trax secured $50 million in venture debt financing from Deutsche Bank Private Credit & Infrastructure to expand its "Signal-Based Merchandising" platform.

== Organizational changes ==
Trax announced key organizational changes in February 2021. Justin Behar is now the chief executive officer. Behar joined Trax in 2018 as part of Trax's acquisition of Quri, a company he founded.

Trax co-founders Joel Bar-El and Dror Feldheim are appointed Executive Chairman and President respectively. Bar-El heads efforts on corporate strategy, long-term vision and innovation and shareholder value creation. Feldheim leads new growth initiatives, global partnerships/alliances and M&A.

== Mergers and acquisitions ==
Trax has made 8 acquisitions since its inception:

On July 12, 2017, Trax announced that it had acquired Nielsen Store Observations (NSO) project-based services in the US from Nielsen Corporation.

On January 18, 2018, Trax announced that it had acquired US-based Quri, a provider of crowdsourced data on in-store conditions for the consumer packaged goods (CPG) industry.

In June 2019, Trax announced its acquisition of LenzTech, a Chinese-based company providing artificial intelligence (AI), crowdsourcing services, and Big Data analysis to the retail market.

In July 2019, Trax announced the acquisition of Shopkick, a US-based company whose shopping app for smartphones and tablets allows users to earn rewards for their online and in-store shopping activities.

In March 2020, Trax acquired Survey.com, a Boston-based retail intelligence and merchandising company. Contemporary reports stated that the acquisition combined Survey.com's retail execution and sales activation capabilities with Trax's retail analytics and computer vision technologies.

=== Corporate restructuring ===
In 2025, Trax Limited announced the divestiture of its image recognition business to private equity firm Gemspring Capital. According to the company, the remaining businesses would continue operating under Trax Ltd. and focus on growth and market expansion.

As of 2026, Survey.com's published privacy policy identifies BET Information Systems, Inc. ("BET") as the operator of the Survey.com website, mobile applications, dashboards, and related services.

== Partnerships ==
In January 2019, Trax announced a partnership with Google Cloud Platform. Using Google Cloud Platform, Trax aims to deliver its Retail Watch image recognition product and machine learning capability to retailers to provide real-time shelf insights, such as out-of-stock products.

== Technology ==
Trax's computer vision technology uses artificial intelligence, fine-grained image recognition, and machine learning engines to convert store images into shelf insights. The technology can recognise products that are similar or identical, such as branded drinks or shampoo bottles but can also differentiate between them based on variety and size.

Trax piloted its machine learning algorithms with initial customers, allowing its algorithm to learn about different products. As the company processes more images, the better the technology gets at recognizing the same products in different shapes and sizes.
