= When McKinsey Comes to Town =

2022 nonfiction book by Walt Bogdanich and Michael Forsythe

When McKinsey Comes to Town: The Hidden Influence of the World's Most Powerful Consulting Firm
- Author: Walt Bogdanich (Author), Michael Forsythe (Author)
- Publication date: October 18, 2022
- ISBN: 9780593081877

When McKinsey Comes to Town is a nonfiction book written by Walt Bogdanich and Michael Forsythe, published by Penguin Random House in 2022. The book discusses McKinsey's history, business practices, and influence on policy and professional culture in the 20th and 21st centuries. The authors relied partly on interviews with "dozens of former and current employees" of McKinsey to source previously inaccessible information for the book.

== Critical reception ==
The book has been reviewed in the New York Times, The Guardian, The Washington Post, Business Insider, and others. Reviewers generally focused on facts and arguments shared in the book, with a focus on the "scandalous" nature of some incidents recounted.
