= Cyriac Roeding =

US-based entrepreneur

- Born: Cyriac Raimar Roeding; March 26, 1973 (age 53); Konstanz, Germany
- Education: Karlsruhe Institute of Technology; Sophia University
- Occupations: Executive VP of CBS; Co-founder and CEO of shopkick President and Founder of Roeding Ventures; Co-founder and CEO of Earli; Co-founder and Chairman of Rewind Co. Former CEO and co-founder of Shopkick
- Known for: AI, intersection of physical and digital, deep tech, biotech, consumer tech, venture investing, innovation, politics

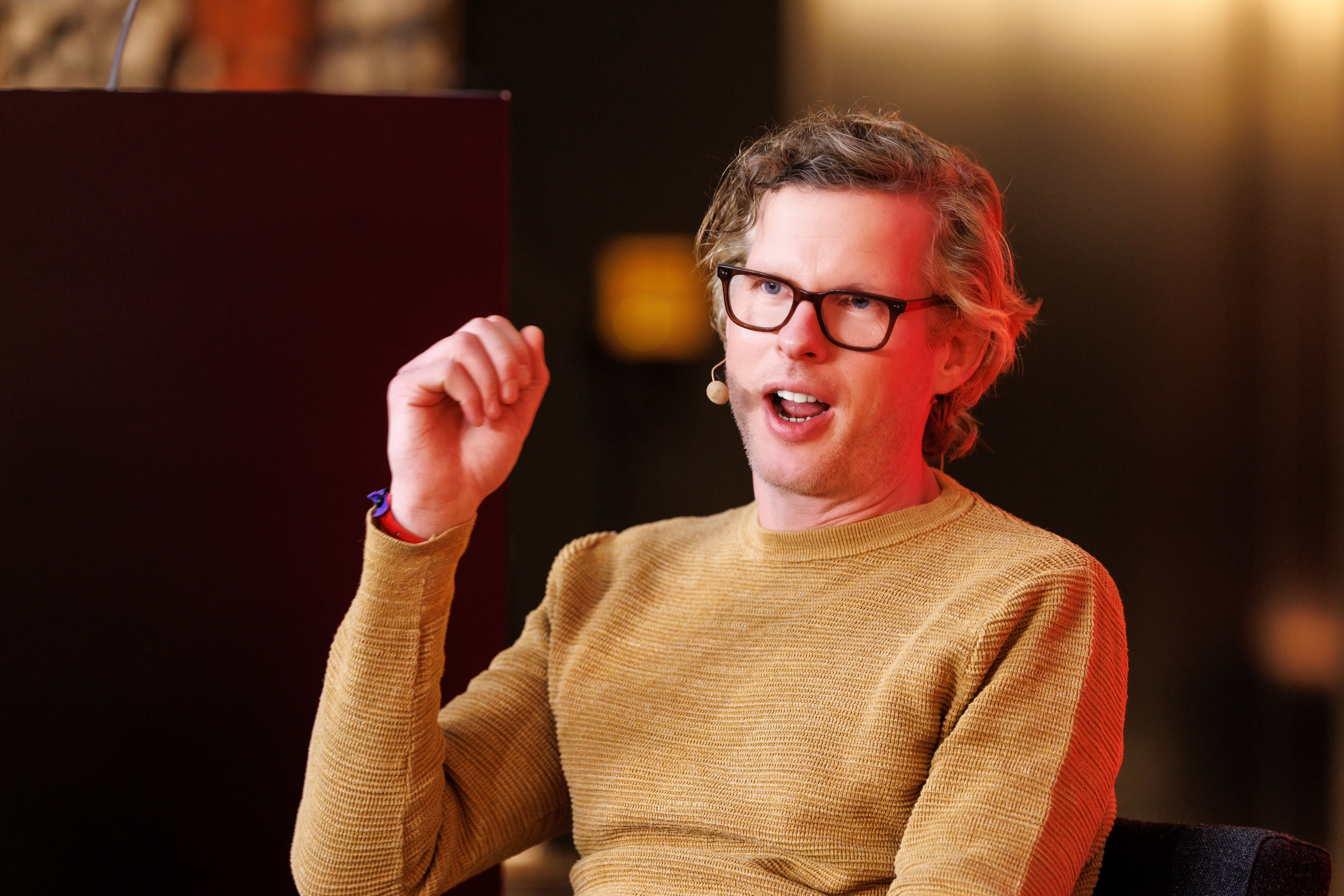
Cyriac Roeding

Cyriac Roeding (born March 26, 1973) is a Silicon Valley–based German–American entrepreneur and investor. He serves as the co-founder and CEO of Earli, an early cancer detection and treatment firm based in Redwood City, California. Earli is based on forcing cancer to turn against itself with a genetic construct that switches on only in cancer cells and activates the immune system to attack and kill the cancer. The concept originated at Stanford University and has substantially evolved through AI and extensive bioengineering. Earli raised >$100M from by Andreessen Horowitz, Khosla Ventures, Perceptive Advisors, Casdin Capital, Sands Capital, Menlo Ventures, ZhenFund (China) and Marc Benioff. Roeding is also a co-founder and chairman of the board of Rewind Co., a diabetes type 2 reversal company. Roeding's venture investing focuses on AI, brain-to-machine interfaces, consumer businesses, biology meeting software and engineering, and consumer robotics. He served as EVP at Paramount Global / CBS (NASDAQ: PARA), where he started the division CBS Mobile and brought it to profitability, and as an entrepreneur-in-residence at Kleiner Perkins and its iFund with Apple Inc., where he co-founded and led mobile shopping app shopkick with $22M of venture capital to a $250 million cash acquisition by SK Telecom/SK Planet (Fortune 100 from South Korea) and 20 million users. Shopkick rewards users for just walking into retail stores such as Target Corporation, Best Buy, Macy's and Walmart and engaging with products from Procter & Gamble, Pepsi, L'Oreal etc., driving over $1 billion in sales annually for its partners. Fast Company ranked shopkick one of the world's 10 Most Innovative Companies In Retail, alongside Apple and Starbucks, and Entrepreneur Magazine placed Roeding on its cover.

The World Economic Forum named Roeding a Tech Pioneer in 2013 and a Global Innovator in 2021. In 2023, he was named a Member of World.Minds, a global community of 1,000 of the world's most successful scientists, entrepreneurs and state leaders.

Roeding is a Limited Partner in venture capital funds Andreessen Horowitz, Founders Fund, Bond (Mary Meeker), Coatue Management, Greylock Partners, KPCB, IVP, Atomic VC, Breakthrough Ventures, Olive Capital, Script Capital, Silicon Valley Bank. He is a direct investor and advisor in over a dozen startups, including OpenAI (artificial general intelligence), LTSE (Long-Term Stock Exchange), Science Inc. (brain-to-machine interfaces), Karma Science (acquired by Facebook), Cardspring (acquired by Twitter), Visby Medical, Cars24 (used car sales platform in India), Blinkit (e-groceries in India), Curbside (acquired by Rakuten), Zumper (home rental marketplace).

He is frequently included on innovation topics such as Chinese vs Silicon Valley startups on CNBC, Bloomberg, CNN, has published on these topics e.g. on Vox/Recode, and has been a speaker at the World Economic Forum in Davos, at Stanford's Entrepreneurial Thought Leaders Program, the CTIA Wireless Summit and Money 2020.

== Early years and education ==
Roeding was born in Constance, Germany, and grew up in a small village north of Frankfurt, Germany. His father is a physicist and his mother worked with under-privileged children. Roeding went to high school in the U.S. (Texas) and Germany.

He sold his first computer program to a local newspaper at the age of 15 in an effort to make his job obsolete, and succeeded. Roeding then became a programmer for Hewlett Packard, while still in high school. He went on to university in Germany and in Tokyo.

Roeding received a degree summa cum laude (diploma) in engineering and business administration ("Wirtschaftsingenieur") from Germany's Karlsruhe Institute of Technology. In 1994, he went to Tokyo to study Japanese management at Sophia University, and there first became exposed to mobile phones that had just become available in Japan.

== Career ==
During college, Roeding was a radio talk show host and reporter, and a management consultant for Roland Berger Strategy Consultants in the retail and technology sectors. After his university degree, Roeding joined McKinsey and Company in Munich, worked on growth business models for media companies, and co-authored the book Secrets of Software Success about the software industry, published by Harvard Business School Press. He later co-founded the mobile marketing firm 12snap in Munich, London and Milan, which worked with Coca-Cola, McDonald's, Nokia, L'Oreal and others and won the first Lion Awards for mobile creative concepts in Cannes. Roeding left to build CBS Mobile, the mobile division of CBS, where his interactive entertainment concepts won Emmy Award nominations. In 2008, he traveled around the world for two months to learn how mobile is used across cultures, e.g. in Bhutan in the Himalayan Mountains, in India and in the Brazilian Amazon Jungle. When Roeding returned, he spent a year at Kleiner Perkins as an Entrepreneur-in-Residence to identify next-generation cross-platform mobile and online venture concepts. In 2009, he founded shopkick, a company that rewards consumers just for being physically present in retail stores or for engaging with products with their smartphones.

== Accomplishments ==
The World Economic Forum named Roeding Tech Pioneer in 2013, Global Innovator in 2021, and the co-chair of its Lung Cancer Working Group; Fortune Magazine named him a 40 Under 40 Mobilizer 2012. He also received the first Emmy Award nominations for Mobile in 2007 and 2008, and the first awards for mobile concepts at the Cannes Lion Festival in France in 2003 and 2004.
