= Johanna Waterous =

Canadian-British businesswoman

- Born: Johanna Elizabeth Martin Waterous; September 1957 (age 68–69)
- Education: University of Western Ontario; Harvard Business School
- Occupation: Businesswoman
- Spouse: Roger Parry

Johanna Elizabeth Martin Waterous CBE (born September 1957) is a London-based Canadian businesswoman.

== Early life ==
Johanna Elizabeth Martin Waterous was born in September 1957 in Brantford, Ontario, Canada. She graduated from the University of Western Ontario with an H.B.Sc. She received a Master in Business Administration from the Harvard Business School in 1985.

== Business career ==
Waterous worked for Dow Chemical for five years. Following business school, she joined McKinsey & Company in London, where she worked for over two decades. She ultimately became the Leader of its European Retail and Co-Head of its Global Consumer Marketing practice by 2007.

Waterous was an operating partner of Duke Street Capital, a private equity firm based in London; she was Chairman of Sandpiper CI until 2017, which was co-owned by Duke Street Capital and Europa Capital.

Waterous was a Non-Executive Director of Wm Morrisons PLC (2016), and the Senior Independent Director of Rexam PLC (2017) and RSA Insurance Group PLC (2018). Additionally, she served on the Board of Directors of Shoppers Drug Mart.

She is presently an independent director on the Boards of COFRA Holdings AG, Herbert Smith Freehills LLP, C. Hoare & Co. Bank, and Rubicon Pharmacies in Canada.

== Philanthropy ==
She served as the Chairman of Tate Enterprises, the commercial arm of the Tate galleries, from 1998 to 2006.

Waterous was a Trustee of the Royal Botanic Gardens, Kew Foundation, and Director of Kew Enterprises from 2008 to 2018.

By 2012, Waterous had donated £4,000 to the Conservative Party.

She was awarded Commander of the Order of the British Empire (CBE), for Services To Business Growth, in the 2013 New Year Honours.

She is a Fellow of and a Director on the Commercial Board of the Royal Horticultural Society.

Waterous is also a Trustee and Governor of the Governing Board of The Courtauld Institute.

== Personal life ==
Waterous has one son and is married to media and technology entrepreneur Roger Parry.
