= Amy Howe =

American technology executive

- Born: Eden, New York
- Education: Cornell University (BS); University of Pennsylvania (MBA)
- Occupation: CEO of FanDuel
- Spouse: Steve Howe (m. 2009)
- Children: 3

Amy Howe is an American gambling executive. She was most recently the CEO of FanDuel until her departure in May 2026. She is a frequent evangelist of live entertainment.

== Early life and education ==
Howe was born in Eden, New York, a suburb of Buffalo. There she attended Eden Junior / Senior High School. In 1994, Howe received a Bachelor of Science (B.S.) in Business, Management, Marketing, and Related Support Services from Cornell University. In 1999 she received a Master of Business Administration (MBA) in Marketing/Marketing Management from the University of Pennsylvania's Wharton Business School.

== Career ==
Howe began her career at Accenture as a business analyst in 1994. In 1997 she left Accenture to pursue her MBA. She then joined McKinsey & Company and worked her way up to partner over her 14 years with the company. She was recruited to Live Nation by CEO Michael Rapino and joined the company as the chief strategy officer in 2014.

In 2015, Howe joined Ticketmaster North America as the COO. In 2020 she left Ticketmaster.

In 2021, Amy was appointed as CEO of FanDuel.

== Honors ==
In 2015, she was named to Billboard's Women In Music 2015: The 50 Most Powerful Executives in the Industry list. In 2016, she was named to Billboard's Women In Music 2016: The 100 Most Powerful Executives list. In 2017, she was named to Billboard's Women in Music 2017: The Most Powerful Executives in the Industry list. Howe was also nominated to the 2017 Sports Business Journal Game Changers list and listed on the National Diversity Council's 2018 list of the Top 50 Most Powerful Women in Technology.

== Boards ==
Howe is one of the Live Nation executives that advise and mentor the companies selected by the Women Nation Fund, an early-stage investment fund that invests in companies founded by women that provide a product or service in the live entertainment space.
