= Roger Parry =

British pollster (born 1953)

Roger Parry CBE
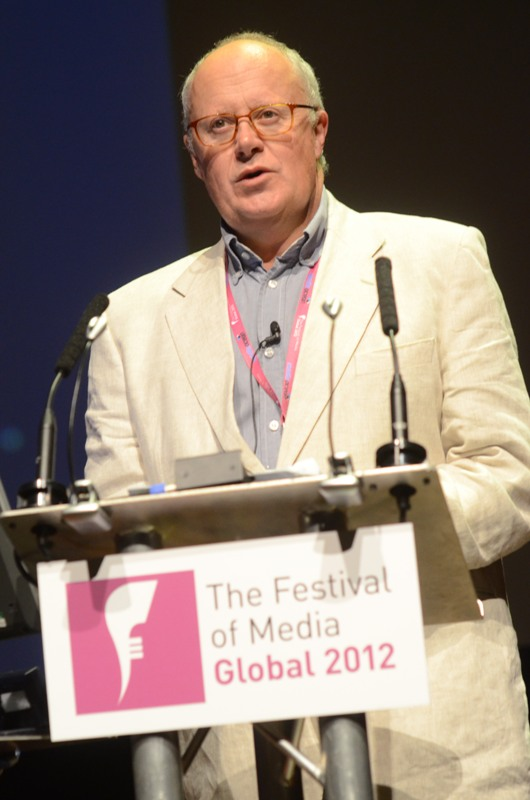
- Roger Parry at the Festival of Media Montreux 2012
- Born: 1953 (age 72–73); London, United Kingdom
- Education: Sutton Grammar School for Boys
- Alma mater: Jesus College, Oxford, Bristol University
- Occupations: Businessman, journalist
- Known for: BBC, Uber, YouGov, Future plc, Johnston Press, Clear Channel, Shakespeare's Globe, HMV, ITV, Jazz fm, LBC
- Spouse: Johanna Waterous
- Children: 1

Roger George Parry CBE (born 1953) is a media and technology entrepreneur based in Canada and the UK. He was chairman of a number of companies quoted on the London Stock Exchange including Future plc, Johnston Press plc, Oxford Metrics plc and YouGov plc. He is the co-founder of the international marketing communications group MSQ Partners and of the television drama production company Chrysalis Vision. He is a visiting fellow of Oxford University. He is the author of six books and writes extensively on the media and associated topics. He was chairman of the trustees of Shakespeare's Globe theatre for eight years. He was a non-executive member of the UK board of directors of Uber.

== Early life ==
Born in London, he was a pupil at Sutton Grammar School for Boys, and educated at the Universities of Bristol and Oxford.

== Career ==
His first job in 1976 was as personal assistant to Charles and Maurice Saatchi, the founders of Saatchi & Saatchi.

From 1977 to 1985 he was a television and radio reporter with the BBC, ITV and LBC. He worked on the Today programme on BBC Radio 4, BBC News and Thames News.

In the mid-1980s he was a consultant with McKinsey & Co. He was there at the same time as Adair Turner, Howard Davies and Archie Norman.

In the late 1980s he was Development Director of the advertising group WCRS which became The Engine Group.

In the 1990s he was part of the team that restructured Aegis Group and built up Carat the media buying network. In 1993 he was appointed the President of Carat North America.

From 1995 to 1998 he was CEO of the UK media company More Group plc.

In 1998 Parry was appointed as a Trustee of Shakespeare's Globe Theatre having been involved with the project since 1987 when he wrote the original business plan – whilst a consultant at McKinsey. In 2005 he was appointed as chairman a post he held until 2013. He was succeeded by Lord Falconer.

In 1998 Parry was one of the founding directors of Clear Media which has become one of China's leading outdoor advertising companies. In 2001 Clear Media was floated on the Hong Kong stock market with a value of US$450 million. Parry was Deputy chairman.

From 1998 to 2005 he was CEO of Clear Channel International which, at the time, was the World's largest operator in radio broadcasting, live entertainment and outdoor advertising. In 2006 Clear Channel was taken private in a buyout valued at US$27 billion. The live entertainment division was later floated as a new company under the name Live Nation Entertainment

From 2001 to 2009 he was Chairman of Johnston Press plc, the UK's largest regional newspaper group. Based in Edinburgh it owns more than 300 titles including The Scotsman and Yorkshire Post. From 2001 to 2011 he was Chairman of magazine publisher Future plc (based in London, Bath and San Francisco) which owns more than 100 titles including Total Film, Digital Camera and Xbox Magazine.

In 2007 Parry become Executive Chairman of international marketing communications group Media Square plc which he subsequently took private in a management buy-out in 2011 to create an employee owned business called MSQ Partners. In 2023 MSQ was sold to private equity group One Equity Partners in a deal reported by the Sunday Times to be worth £170 million

Parry was appointed as non-executive director of Uber on 6 April 2018.

== Activities ==
In February 2014 The Sunday Times reported that Parry along with entrepreneurs Chris Wright And Luke Johnson had founded a company to produce television drama called Chrysalis Vision. In December 2015 they used the innovative crowdfunding platform CrowdCube to raise US$500,000 (UK£330,000) to fund operations.

In both 2011 and 2012 Parry was the Chairman of the Global Festival of Media held in Montreux

In November 2010 Parry was named by bookmakers Paddy Power as the 11/8 favourite to become the next Chairman of the BBC Trust – a role which in fact went to Lord Patten

In 2009 he was commissioned by the UK's Conservative Party to write a report on the future of local media. His proposals on local TV were subsequently adopted as Government policy by Culture Secretary Jeremy Hunt.

Also in 2009 he was appointed as the Chairman of the Local Media Alliance which was a consortium of local newspaper groups lobbying for changes to the UK's competition regulations

During 2006 he was linked with a number of private equity bids including one for the retail chain HMV and another for the British television broadcaster ITV. He was twice forced by the UK Takeover Panel to deny rumours that he was about to bid for ITV.

Between 2000 and 2005, he was frequently mentioned as a possible bidder for the radio station Capital 95.8 and in 2003 the CEO of Capital said that if Parry did make an offer it would be rejected out of hand. According to The Guardian newspaper, Parry responded to this by saying: "It would be like Ann Widdecombe turning down a date from Brad Pitt".

In 2003 it was suggested that Parry as Chairman of Johnston Press might have agreed to the sacking of the editor of a local paper in Hartlepool who had been critical of his local MP Peter Mandelson at the request of the Prime Minister Tony Blair. Parry was highly critical of the Hartlepool Mail editor in a speech he gave to the Johnston Press Editors' conference. The attack was so pointed that North East Press (a division of Johnston Press) Editorial Director Andrew Smith raised the speech with Chief Executive Tim Bowdler. Mandelson, Blair and Parry had been contemporaries at Oxford University in the late 1970s. All three men subsequently denied the allegation. Hartlepool Mail editor Harry Blackwood subsequently accepted an out of court settlement from Johnston Press.

In 2003 as the largest private shareholder in the radio station 102.2 Jazz FM Parry held the casting votes in a hostile take-over by the Guardian Media Group which was opposed by the Jazz FM management. He voted for the sale and was criticised by the Jazz FM CEO.

In 1999 Parry and Mark Slater floated a company called Internet Indirect plc on the London Stock Exchange which rapidly achieved a market value in excess of £200 million. In 2000 it was sold to rival technology investment group Newmedia Spark plc with Parry and Slater reported to have made more than £3m

In 1998 during a contested bid battle for More Group plc he referred to the Chief Executive of commercial rival JC Decaux and would-be hostile bidder, Jean- Francois Decaux, as being two baguettes short of a picnic .

In 1984 he was named as one of the people behind the highly successful pirate radio station Laser 558. Also that year Parry was a member of a consortium including Jocelyn Stevens and Tina Brown which attempted, but failed, to win the franchise for the London radio station LBC. In 1994 he tried again with London Radio which also involved broadcaster John Tusa and was, this time, successful but sold the station 9 weeks later at a profit of £5 million.

Parry was appointed Commander of the Order of the British Empire (CBE) in the 2014 New Year Honours for services to media and the arts, particularly the Globe Theatre.

== Publications ==
In July 2006 he wrote an article for the Financial Times about the future of television and the Internet called "A Box to transform the media" which resulted in a lively debate about the convergence of technologies and the effect on broadcast television.

He has written numerous book reviews including of: Wikinomics by Don Tapscott in 2007, Crowdsourcing by Jeff Howe in 2008, Free by Chris Anderson in 2009, One Click – the biography of Jeff Bezos by Richard Brandt and The Firm by Duff McDonald.

His published books are:

- Parry, Roger (2022). Anticipating Disruption. London: Amazon. ISBN 979-8591532147.
- Parry, Roger (2013). Delivering the Neural Nudge. London: MSQ Partners. ISBN 9781484010075.
- Parry, Roger (2011). The Ascent of Media. London: Nicholas Brealey. ISBN 978-1-85788-570-5.
- Parry, Roger; George Hazel (2004). Making Cities Work. London: Wiley-Academy.
- Parry, Roger (2003). Enterprise:The leadership role. London: Profile. ISBN 1-86197-634-8.
- Parry, Roger (1991). People Businesses: Managing Professional Service Firms. London: Random House. ISBN 0-09-174661-2.

== Personal life ==
Parry is married to Johanna Waterous.
