= Michael Forsythe =

American journalist

Michael Forsythe is an American journalist. He is an investigative reporter for The New York Times. He is also the coauthor of two books.

== Biography ==
Forsythe received his bachelor's degree in economics from Georgetown University. He also studied Chinese there.

From 1990 to 1997, Forsythe served as an officer in the U.S. Navy, mostly in the Pacific. In 1999, he received a master's degree in East Asian area studies from Harvard University. He also studied Chinese at Tsinghua University.

Beginning in 2000, Forsythe was a reporter for Kyodo News in Beijing. As of 2012 he was a reporter for Bloomberg News in Beijing. He later reported from Washington, D.C. for Bloomberg. He joined the New York Times investigations team in 2017 while living in Hong Kong.

== Awards and honors ==
In 2013, Forsythe was part of a team that won the George Polk Award for a series of reports titled "Revolution to Riches," investigating wealth among Chinese leaders' relatives. In 2023, he and Walt Bogdanich received the IRE Award for their book When McKinsey Comes to Town.

== Personal life ==
As of 2026, Forsythe is based in New York City; he is married to China scholar Leta Hong Fincher.

== Books ==
- with Walt Bogdanich. When McKinsey Comes to Town: The Hidden Influence of the World's Most Powerful Consulting Firm (Penguin Random House, 2022)
- with Henry Sanderson. China's Superbank: Debt, Oil and Influence - How China Development Bank is Rewriting the Rules of Finance (Wiley, 2013)
