= Broadband Stakeholder Group =

UK government's advisory body

The Broadband Stakeholder Group is the UK government's advisory body on broadband. Created in 2001 by then Minister for E-Commerce and Competitiveness Stephen Timms, it provides a neutral forum for organisations across the converging broadband value-chain to discuss and resolve key policy, regulatory, and commercial issues, with the ultimate aim of helping to create a strong and competitive UK knowledge economy.

Its initial focus was on increasing broadband penetration in the UK before leading a collaborative UK response to the European Commission's Audio-Visual Media Services Directive. Since late 2006, its primary focus has been the next generation broadband debate in the UK. Their current work programme focuses on issues that impact the deployment of superfast broadband in rural areas, including the government's £530m programme being run by BDUK, and on developing industry consensus regarding the Open Internet.

== Sponsors ==
The BSG is partly funded by industry and government. The current sponsors are:

3UK
Alcatel-Lucent
Arqiva
BBC
BSkyB
BT Group
Department for Culture, Media and Sport
Ericsson
EE
Intellect (trade association)
ITV plc
TalkTalk Group
Virgin Media
Vodafone
UK Broadband

== Executive ==
BSG activity is led by an Executive Committee which meets every six weeks. The board comprises a representative from each sponsor organisation, along with other representatives from the national regulator, other public sector bodies, SMEs, rights holders, consumers, and community broadband groups. The current membership of the Executive committee is:

BBC
Cellnex
CityFibre
Colt
Conerstone
Department for Digital, Culture, Media and Sport
Ericsson
Gigaclear
Hyperoptic
Mova
Nexfibre
Ofcom
Openreach
Sky
TalkTalk Group
Tech UK
Virgin Media
Vodafone
Wireless Infrastructure Group

== Advisory Council ==
In addition to the Executive Committee, an advisory council meets 2–3 times per year to discuss industry developments. The advisory council is made up of senior representatives from the sponsor organisations.

== BSG Chairs ==
The BSG has had four independent chairs since its creation. Its first chairman was Keith Todd, a former ICL CEO, appointed by e-Commerce Minister Douglas Alexander, who served as chairman from 2002 to 2005. Upon stepping down, he was replaced by Philip Graf, former Trinity Media CEO. Graf was appointed Deputy Chairman of Ofcom at the end of 2005, and the BSG operated without a chairman until Kip Meek, a former Ofcom board member and Chief Policy Partner, was appointed in February 2007, before leaving in July 2010. Its current chair is Richard Hooper CBE, former Deputy Chair of Ofcom.

== Recent Work ==
The BSG has focused on next generation broadband issues since the end of 2006. In April 2007, it published 'Pipe Dreams? Prospects for next generation broadband in the UK'. In June 2008, it published two further reports that built on the themes in Pipe Dreams: 'A Framework for Evaluating the Value of Next Generation Broadband' and 'Models for efficient and effective public sector intervention in next generation broadband access infrastructure'. In September 2008, the BSG published 'The costs of deploying fibre-based next generation broadband infrastructure' as an input to the UK government's independent review of next generation broadband in the UK, led by former Cable and Wireless CEO Francesco Caio. During this time, the BSG has also responded to two Ofcom consultations on next generation broadband regulation, as well as European Commission consultation on the same subject.

Its initial position on superfast broadband was that the government and the regulator should leave investment in telecommunications infrastructure to the market; since 2009, however, it has worked with governments to ensure the most successful use of funds that have been made available for the deployment of superfast broadband in rural areas. It continues to work on issues in this area through the COTS Project (which seeks to enable the provision of services by large ISPs on alternative access networks) and its work on the application of non-domestic rates to superfast broadband networks in rural areas.

Its other main area of work is the Open Internet. In 2011, BSG facilitated an agreement between ISPs to provide further clarity to consumers on their traffic management policies; this agreement is continuing to develop through its implementation phase. At the request of the Minister for Communications Ed Vaizey MP, BSG is currently facilitating industry discussions between ISPs and content providers over principles to underpin the Open Internet, reflecting the Internet's value as a platform for innovation, the need for operators to manage the traffic on their networks, and the desire to ensure that the business models of the future for Internet-based services can be allowed to develop.

The BSG has also continued to be active in online content regulation. In early 2008, it facilitated the creation of the 'Audiovisual Content Services Good Practice Principles', a self-regulatory code designed to encourage the industry to provide appropriate information regarding audiovisual content, regardless of the platform of delivery. These principles are due to be reviewed in 2009 to examine their effectiveness. The BSG has also continued to work on the implementation of the Audiovisual Media Services Directive in the UK.

== Links ==
- Official Site
