= Kip Meek =

British businessman (born 1955)

Kip Meek (born 18 April 1955), full name Kingsley John Neville Meek, is a British businessperson specialising in media and telecommunication.

== Career ==
Kip Meek held board level roles at Ofcom from 2003 until 2007. He joined Ofcom as senior partner for content and competition.

He assisted Ofcom's first Chief Executive Stephen Carter integrating existing telecoms and media regulators into a single organisation.

In 2005, he became Ofcom's Chief Policy Officer and Chairman of the European Regulators' Group (ERG), handling Ofcom's relationship with European and International political institutions. He also had responsibility for Ofcom's Content & Standards Group, and Ofcom's Legal Group.

Kip Meek was a founder and Managing Director of Spectrum Strategy Consulting, incorporated in 1993 (a consultancy specialising in media, telecommunications, and information technology).

Previous positions include leading Coopers & Lybrand's media and telecoms strategy practice in London, and positions at the Boston Consulting Group, McKinsey & Co and British Telecom.

On 23 July 2010, Kip Meek was announced as non-executive chairman of Project Canvas (now YouView). Meek leads the Board of the venture and oversaw the appointment of Chief Executive Officer, Richard Halton. He stepped down from his role as Director of Ingenious Media. He also left his positions as Chairman of the Broadband Stakeholder Group and as director of the RadioCentre and Phorm. Meek left YouView on 7 March 2011 and was replaced by Alan Sugar.
As of March 2011, he is employed at EE as an adviser and is part of Communications Chambers.

== Controversy ==
His role as a member of Phorm's board was claimed to conflict with his work as a taxpayer-funded advisor on UK internet policy for BERR during the publication of the Digital Britain strategy.

At the same time, the UK Government faced European Commission infraction proceedings, following the covert trials of Phorm's technology by British Telecom in 2006 and 2007.

== Education ==
- 1979-81 London Business School, MSc with Distinction
- 1973-76 Magdalen College, Oxford, First Class Honours, Modern History

== Roles ==
- 1977 Consultant, Boston Consulting Group
- 1981 Consultant, McKinsey & Co
- 1984 Deputy director of marketing, BT
- 1986 Managing director, Octagon Services
- 1988 Partner, Coopers & Lybrand
- 1993 Founder, Spectrum Strategy Consultants
- 2003 Senior partner, Ofcom
- 2005 Chief policy officer, Ofcom
- 2007 MD, Ingenious Consulting; chairman, BSG; director, RadioCentre
- 2008 Director, Phorm
- 2010 Non-Executive Chairman, YouView

== Directorships ==
- Ingenious Media Consulting Limited
- Ingenious Media Limited
- Perspective Associates Limited
- RadioCentre Limited

== See also ==
"Response to Ovum's report "Telstra ULLS Undertaking – ULLS International Benchmarking"" (PDF). Ingenious Consulting Network. December 2008. (includes full CV).
