= Walt Bogdanich =

American journalist (born 1950)

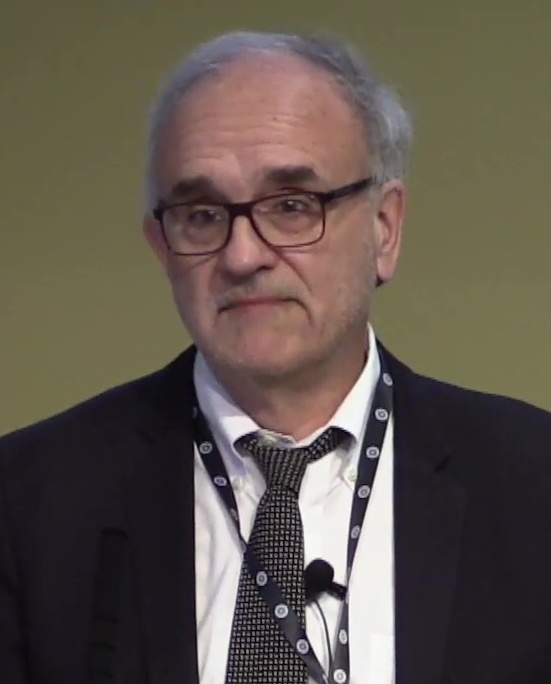
- Born: October 10, 1950 (age 75); Chicago, Illinois, U.S.
- Education: University of Wisconsin–Madison; Ohio State University
- Occupation: Journalist
- Spouse: Stephanie Saul
- Children: 2
- Awards: Pulitzer Prize for Specialized Reporting (1988); Gerald Loeb Award (1999, 2005, 2008, 2017); George Polk Award (2004); Pulitzer Prize for National Reporting (2005); Pulitzer Prize for Investigative Reporting (2008)

Walt Bogdanich (born October 10, 1950) is an American investigative journalist and three-time recipient of the Pulitzer Prize.

== Biography ==
Bogdanich graduated from the University of Wisconsin–Madison in 1975 with a degree in political science. He received a master's in journalism from Ohio State University in 1976.

Bogdanich is assistant editor for The New York Times Investigations Desk and an adjunct professor at the Columbia University Graduate School of Journalism. Before joining The Times in 2001, he was an investigative producer for 60 Minutes on CBS and for ABC News. Previously, he worked as an investigative reporter for The Wall Street Journal.

Bogdanich co-authored the 2022 book When McKinsey Comes to Town: The Hidden Influence of the World’s Most Powerful Consulting Firm about consulting giant McKinsey & Company with Michael Forsythe (ISBN 9780593081877).

== Awards ==
In 1988, while a reporter for The Wall Street Journal, Bogdanich won the Pulitzer Prize for Specialized Reporting for reporting about faulty testing in American medical laboratories. He shared with Mike Wallace the 1999 Gerald Loeb Award for Network and Large-Market Television for an "Investigative Piece on the International Pharmaceutical Industry." In 1979, 1994, 2002 and 2004, he won the George Polk Award. The 1994 award was for an ABC Day One investigation on Big Tobacco's addition of nicotine to cigarettes. In 2005, now a reporter at The New York Times, he won the Pulitzer Prize for National Reporting and the 2005 Gerald Loeb Award for Large Newspapers for a series of reports about corporate cover-ups of fatal accidents at railway crossings. In 2008, Bogdanich and New York Times colleague Jake Hooker won the Pulitzer Prize for Investigative Reporting for reporting on toxic substances that were discovered in products imported from China. Their reporting also won the 2008 Gerald Loeb Award for Large Newspapers. Bogdanich received the Gerald Loeb Lifetime Achievement Award in 2010, and shared another Gerald Loeb Award in 2017 for Images/Graphics/Interactives.

== Personal life ==
Bogdanich is of Serbian descent. He is married to Stephanie Saul, a reporter for The New York Times who won a Pulitzer Prize winner for her work at Newsday. They have two sons.
