= Azran Osman Rani =

Malaysian businessman

Azran Osman-Rani is the CEO and co-founder of Naluri, a digital health startup based in Malaysia. He was the COO of iflix Group and CEO of iflix Malaysia from 2015 to 2017. Prior to that, he was the CEO of AirAsia X.

Azran was previously a Senior Director of Business Development at Astro, a Southeast Asian digital satellite television and radio broadcaster and content producer, and held positions at McKinsey & Company and Booz Allen Hamilton.

He holds a master's degree in economics and engineering, and a bachelor's degree in electrical engineering, both from Stanford University.
