= Microsoft services =

Microsoft services may refer to:

- Microsoft mobile services, the services Microsoft provides on the mobile platform.
- Microsoft Online Services, the services Microsoft provides on the web platform.
- Microsoft Analysis Services
- Microsoft Services Asia

== See also ==
- Windows Live
- List of Microsoft software
- List of Microsoft Windows components
