= Maximilian Weinzierl =

Austrian politician (born 1997)

Member of the National Council
- Incumbent
- Assumed office 24 October 2024
- Constituency: Federal list

Personal details
- Born: 22 March 1997 (age 29)
- Party: Freedom Party

Maximilian Weinzierl (born 22 March 1997) is an Austrian politician of the Freedom Party. He was elected member of the National Council in the 2024 legislative election, and has served as a head of the Freedom Party's youth wing since 2023.
