= Laura Lee Weinzierl =

American geologist

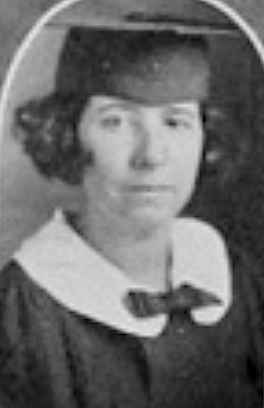
- Laura Lee Lane, later Weinzierl, from the 1923 yearbook of the University of Texas at Austin
- Born: Laura Lee Lane; July 28, 1900; Louisville, Kentucky
- Died: September 28, 1928 (age 28); Houston, Texas
- Occupations: Geologist, micropaleontologist
- Spouse: John Frederick Weinzierl (m. 1926)

Laura Lee Weinzierl (née Lane; July 28, 1900 – September 28, 1928) was an American petroleum geologist and micropaleontologist who worked in the Texas and Gulf Coast oil fields.

== Early life and education ==
Lane was born in Louisville, Kentucky. She graduated from San Antonio High School in 1917, and earned a bachelor's degree in geology from the University of Texas at Austin in 1923. At university, she was a charter member of the Beta chapter of Chi Upsilon, a geology honor society for women.

== Career ==
Lane worked for the Rio Bravo Oil Company for a summer during college. She was a micropaleontologist for Marland Oil Company. She studied Foraminifera to identify sites likely to contain oil and gas in the Texas and Gulf Coast regions. She was a member of the American Association of Petroleum Geologists, the Society of Economic Paleontologists and Mineralogists and a charter member of the Houston Geological Society. She presented her research at the American Association of Petroleum Geologists meeting in Houston in 1924.

== Publications ==
- "Hockley Salt Dome, Harris County, Texas" (1925, with Alexander Deussen)
- "The Claiborne Formation on the coastal domes" (1929, with Esther Richards Applin)

== Personal life ==
Lane married fellow geologist John Frederick Weinzierl in 1926. She died in 1928, in Houston, at the age of 28, from an asthma attack. A collection of her papers and artifacts is in the natural history collection of Sam Houston State University.
