= Roberto Nicastro =

Italian banker

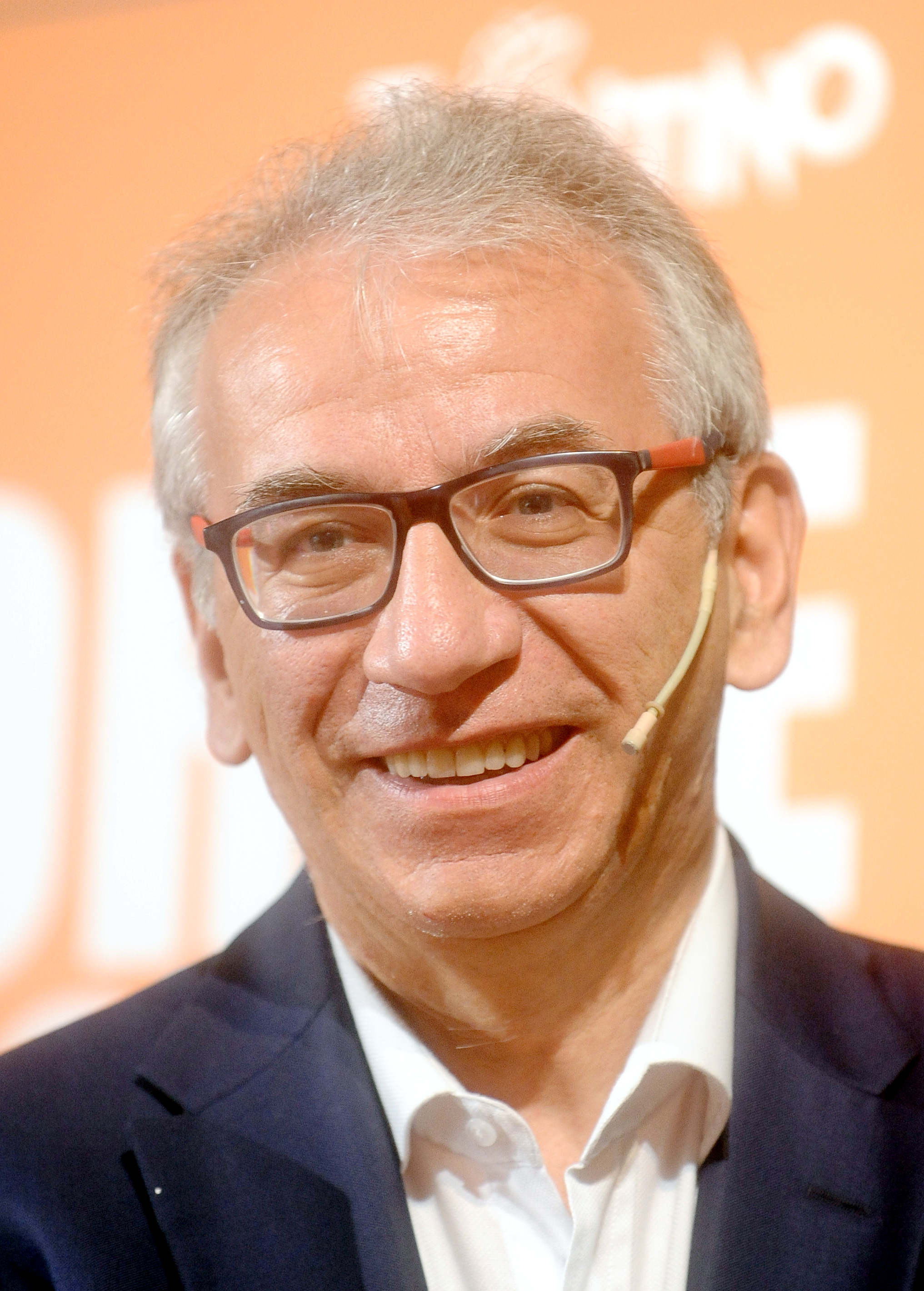
- Nicastro at the Festival of Economics in Trento in 2018
- Born: 9 December 1964 (age 61); Trento
- Education: Bocconi University
- Known for: Unicredit Group GM
- Spouse: Married 1994
- Children: 2

Roberto Nicastro, an Italian banker and Fintech Investor, senior advisor for Cerberus Capital, and Chairman of AideXa, a challenger bank project aiming to serve small businesses. Previously he was the Chairman of the "Good Banks" on behalf of Bank of Italy and was the Group General Manager of Unicredit; in the past, he worked with McKinsey & Co and Salomon Brothers. He is also involved in charitable activities and postgraduate education advisory.

== Early years ==
He was born in Trento, on December 9, 1964, where he has lived up to senior age.

He then moved to Milano, where he earned a Major in Business Administration at Bocconi University in 1989, under Professor Claudio Dematté's tutorship.

== Career ==
In 1989 he joined the M&A department of Salomon Brothers in London.

In 1991 he became a strategic consultant in Milan with McKinsey & Co, where he had been involved in consumer goods, financial services, and banking regulation projects in Italy and in Brazil.

Roberto Nicastro joined UniCredit in May 1997, as Head of Strategy, Planning and Control of then Credito Italiano. In the early years at Unicredit he developed the footprint of the Unicredit Group in Central and Eastern Europe through the acquisition and following restructuring/integration of Bank Pekao (Poland), Zagrebačka banka (Croatia-Bosnia), Bulbank (Bulgaria), Koçbank (50%, Turkey), Živnostenská banka (Czech republic), Demir Bank (Romania), Polnobanka (Slovakia). By 2003 Unicredit had become one of the top three banking groups in the CEE region.

In 2003 he became Head of Italian Retail and CEO of UniCredit Banca, where beyond turning around the profitability of the business, he had been introducing companywide leadership trainings and individualized coaching as well as systematic customer satisfaction measurement and incentive systems.

In July 2007 he was appointed Deputy CEO of the UniCredit group and became head of Unicredit retail operations in Italy, Germany, Austria and Poland. Following the appointment of Federico Ghizzoni as Unicredit's Group CEO, he was appointed as the General Manager of Unicredit. He left Unicredit in 2015.

He has served also as Deputy Chairman of the supervisory board of Bank Pekao (Poland) and a member of the Supervisory Boards of Bank Austria and of ZAO UniCredit Bank Russia; has been First Deputy Chairman of the Italian Banking Association (ABI), and member of the executive committee of Assonime. From 2009 to 2012 Roberto Nicastro served as Chairman of EFMA, the European Financial Management Association in Paris and has often been quoted on Commercial and European banking matters.

On 22 November 2015, he was appointed by Bank of Italy as chairman of four rescued banks of Italy: Nuova Banca dell'Etruria e del Lazio, Nuova Banca delle Marche, Nuova Cassa di Risparmio di Chieti and Nuova Cassa di Risparmio di Ferrara, with the goal to bring them back in "bonis" and divest them in the shortest possible timeframe, according to the EU requirements. This was the first European bank resolution process that concluded successfully, without any state aid and in line with the EU requests. The Banks were sold to solid long term investors: UBI group and BPER. Later he has chaired Cassa del Trentino, has been deputy chairman and Head of the Risk Committee of UbiBanca.

Currently, he serves as the advisor for Europe for Cerberus Capital, he is non-executive chairman of Officine CST (an Italian company controlled by Cerberus) and is active in the Fintech and startups space, where together with his wife owns or has held minority stakes in a number of companies, including DoveVivo, Yapily, Deus Technology, Talent Garden, Bandyer, Work Invoice, Mia Platform.

Together with nine other friends, he has recently co-founded AideXa, a digital and challenger bank project that aims to serve Italian small businesses, by leveraging on artificial intelligence technology. AideXa's capital raising seed round has initially totalled almost €48m, from investors such as Generali Group, Sella Group, IFIS, ISA, Confartigianato, Mediocredito Centrale, Banca Popolare di Ragusa, 360 Capital Partners, and several family offices and angel investors. By mid 2024, Aidexa has extended close to 900 million of loans to Italian small businesses and targets break-even by year-end.

== Other activities ==
He serves in the board of Fondazione Archè, a charity based in Milano and in the Comitato Amici di Claudio Dematté in Trento. He served in the advisory board of SDA Bocconi School of Management, Milan, and in the International Advisory Board of Bologna Business School and of The Johns Hopkins University SAIS Bologna Center.

== Personal life ==
Roberto Nicastro is married to Silvia and has two children, Camilla and Lorenzo.
