= Entrepreneur in residence =

Organizational position

An entrepreneur in residence, or executive in residence (EIR), is a position commonly held by successful entrepreneurs in venture capital firms, private equity firms, startup accelerators, law firms or business schools. Typically, the EIR has led or currently leads a small, early-stage, emerging company with perceived high-growth potential or has demonstrated significant growth in terms of employees, annual revenue, or both.

Institutional fund may provide an entrepreneur in residence, or executive in residence, with the necessary working capital to facilitate expansion, new-product development, or the restructuring of a company's operations, management, or ownership.

== Venture capital, private equity, startup accelerators ==
In a venture capital fund, a private equity fund or a startup accelerator; the entrepreneur in residence works with the general partners and assists the firm's portfolio companies by leveraging their industry knowledge, expertise, and network. Additionally, they are tasked with evaluating new investment opportunities for the venture capital or private equity fund, particularly within their domain of expertise.

The venture capital firm usually benefits from significant access to the new company initiated by the EIR. This stems from the fact that the general partners are typically the initial investors in the EIR's new venture, providing them with an opportunity to invest before angel investors and other venture capital firms.

== Business school ==
In business schools, an EIR provides guidance to MBA students who are starting their own companies. The type of nurturing an EIR can provide to a business school environment helps students and professors by sharing their industry experience and expertise. The EIR helps students and professors develop new ideas and turn them into sustainable ventures.

== Corporate EIRs ==
EIR's, or entrepreneurs in residence were once found mostly at venture capital firms, but the role has expanded and you can now find them at a variety of companies - including tech companies.

At a law firm, the entrepreneur in residence provides professional services to the firm's clients. Law firms may offer the advisory service to entrepreneurs in order to gain clients by helping them with venture decisions and networks.
