= David Carl Edelman =

David C. Edelman (born 1961) was Chief Marketing Officer at Aetna from 2016 to 2020, leaving after the merger with CVS. Since July, 2021, he has been a Senior Lecturer at the Harvard Business School.

== Education ==
He graduated from Midwood High School in Brooklyn, New York in 1978.

Edelman attended Harvard University from 1978 to 1982. He graduated with a Bachelor of Arts degree in Economics in 1982, and after 18 months at Booz, Allen, and Hamilton, subsequently earned his MBA degree, with an emphasis in marketing, from Harvard Business School in 1986.

== Career ==
Edelman began his career at The Boston Consulting Group (BCG) from 1986 until 1999. He served as a Partner and Vice President and was instrumental in building their e-commerce practice and “Segment of One Marketing” strategy service line. He ran the marketing for their East Coast operations, coordinating publishing and conferences.

In 1999, Edelman joined Digitas, becoming the leader of their strategy and analysis practice. In 2002, Edelman was promoted to the role of Chief Marketing Officer, which was a new role created by chairman and CEO David Kenny to scale Digitas’ business and increase brand awareness.

In 2008, Edelman joined McKinsey & Company as a partner, where he co-led the Global Digital Marketing and Sales Practice and served as Chief Marketing Officer for the Marketing and Sales Practice. During his 8-year tenure at McKinsey, Edelman worked with CMOs and senior executives across industries, advising client organizations on implementing digital transformation strategies and developing new digital capabilities.

In 2016, Edelman joined Aetna as its first Chief Marketing Officer, and led the launch of Aetna’s rebranding with a campaign focused on “you don’t join us, we join you.” He built an “Office of the Consumer” to guide design of new member experiences, and centralized marketing technology.

In addition to his current role at Aetna, Edelman is also on the Board of Trustees of The Walnut Hill School for the Arts, in Natick, Massachusetts.

== Speaking, contributed writing and awards ==
Edelman speaks frequently at industry conferences around the world, and has published numerous articles in leading business publications such as the Harvard Business Review and Forbes on topics ranging from branding in the digital age, to mastering digital marketing, and improving CMO/COO collaboration. He has also written extensively about digital strategies, consumer behavior, using data to make better decisions, and the Customer Decision Journey. Edelman has participated in webinars and podcasts discussing the digital customer journey, marketing technology, and digital transformation in healthcare. He also periodically guest teaches classes at Harvard Business School.

Edelman has been listed among Twitter’s most influential CMOs and smartest marketers on Twitter by publications like Forbes, Business Insider, and Inc. for multiple consecutive years and has contributed to a book on social media marketing.
