= Julian C. Day =

- Born: May 14, 1952 (age 74)
- Occupation: corporate executive

Julian C. Day (born May 14, 1952) is an American corporate executive. He is the former president and CEO of Kmart and the former CEO of RadioShack.

== Career ==
Day was elected chairman and CEO of RadioShack in 2006 and stepped down in 2011. In 2002, Day became president and COO of Kmart Holding Corporation and in 2003 he was promoted to CEO. Under his leadership, Kmart's value increased from $1.5 billion to $9 billion. Prior to Kmart, he was the CFO then the COO of Sears.

Day received both bachelor's and master's degrees from Oxford University and an MBA from the London Business School.
