= Weinzierl am Walde =

- Municipality
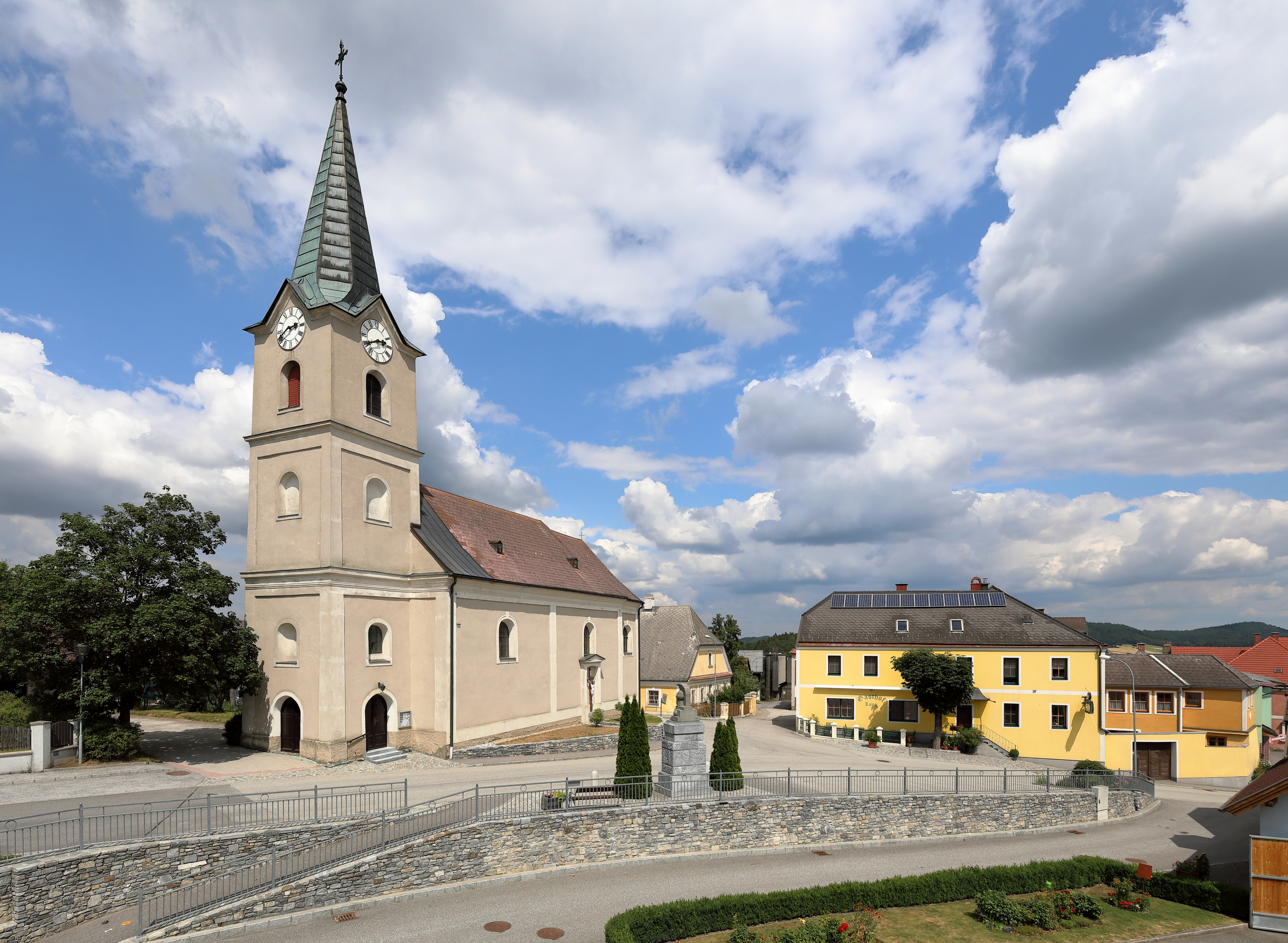
- Center of Weinzierl am Walde with the Church of Saint Joseph

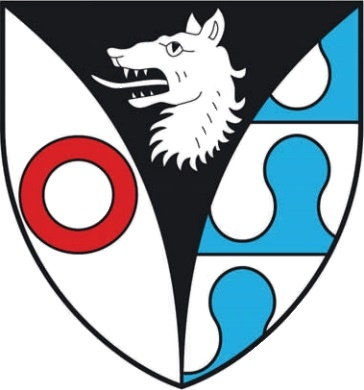
- Coat of arms

- Location within Austria
- Coordinates: 48°25′N 15°26′E
- Country: Austria
- State: Lower Austria
- District: Krems-Land

Government
  - Mayor: Herbert Prandtner (ÖVP)

Area
  - Total: 44.6 km^{2} (17.2 sq mi)
- Elevation: 647 m (2,123 ft)

Population (2018-01-01)
  - Total: 1,240
  - Density: 27.8/km^{2} (72.0/sq mi)
- Time zone: UTC+1 (CET)
  - Summer (DST): UTC+2 (CEST)
- Postal code: 3611
- Area code: 02717
- Website: https://www.weinzierl-walde.gv.at/

Weinzierl am Walde is a town in the district of Krems-Land in the Austrian state of Lower Austria.

== Population ==
Historical population
Year	Pop.	±%
1869	1,850	—
1880	1,877	+1.5%
1890	1,924	+2.5%
1900	1,910	−0.7%
1910	1,824	−4.5%
1923	1,801	−1.3%
1934	1,705	−5.3%
1939	1,595	−6.5%
1951	1,556	−2.4%
1961	1,478	−5.0%
1971	1,472	−0.4%
1981	1,391	−5.5%
1991	1,362	−2.1%
2001	1,356	−0.4%
2011	1,299	−4.2%
