= Matthew C. Weinzierl =

American academic

Matthew Weinzierl
- Born: Minnesota
- Education: Harvard University (PhD)
- Employer: Harvard Business School
- Spouse: Coventry Edwards-Pitt

Matthew C. Weinzierl is an American academic. He is a professor of Business Administration at the Harvard Business School. He has published research on taxation. He worked at McKinsey & Company after he attended Harvard University.

== Education ==
Weinzierl earned a PhD in economics from Harvard University in 2008.

== Career ==
Weinzierl worked as an economist for McKinsey & Company and the Council of Economic Advisers. He later joined the Harvard Business School as a professor of Business Administration. He is also a research associate at the National Bureau of Economic Research.

Weinzierl has published research on taxation. He believes the United States should have a value-added tax. With Alexander Gelber, an associate professor at the University of California, Berkeley's Goldman School of Public Policy, Weinzierl won the Richard Musgrave Prize from the National Tax Association in 2016.

== Personal life ==
Matthew Weinzierl is married to Coventry Edwards-Pitt. They live in Massachusetts.
