= McKinsey's Marvin Bower =

2004 book by Elizabeth Haas Edersheim

McKinsey’s Marvin Bower: Vision, Leadership and the Creation of Management Consulting.
- Book Cover
- Author: Elizabeth Haas Edersheim
- Language: English
- Subject: Management, organizational studies, biography
- Genre: Nonfiction
- Publisher: John Wiley & Sons, Inc.
- Publication date: April 12, 2004
- Publication place: United States
- Pages: 305 pp.
- ISBN: 0-471-65285-7

McKinsey's Marvin Bower: Vision, Leadership and the Creation of Management Consulting is a book by Elizabeth Haas Edersheim, one of the first female partners of McKinsey. The book is about Marvin Bower, McKinsey visionary leader who transformed the company from an accounting and engineering practice into one of the world's premier management consulting firms and who is considered to be the founder of management consulting.

The book has a very positive feedback from the consultant community. Particularly, Peter F. Drucker said the book "makes Marvin come to life and perpetuates him as a role model".
