= Feridun Hamdullahpur =

Canadian academic

Feridun Hamdullahpur CM
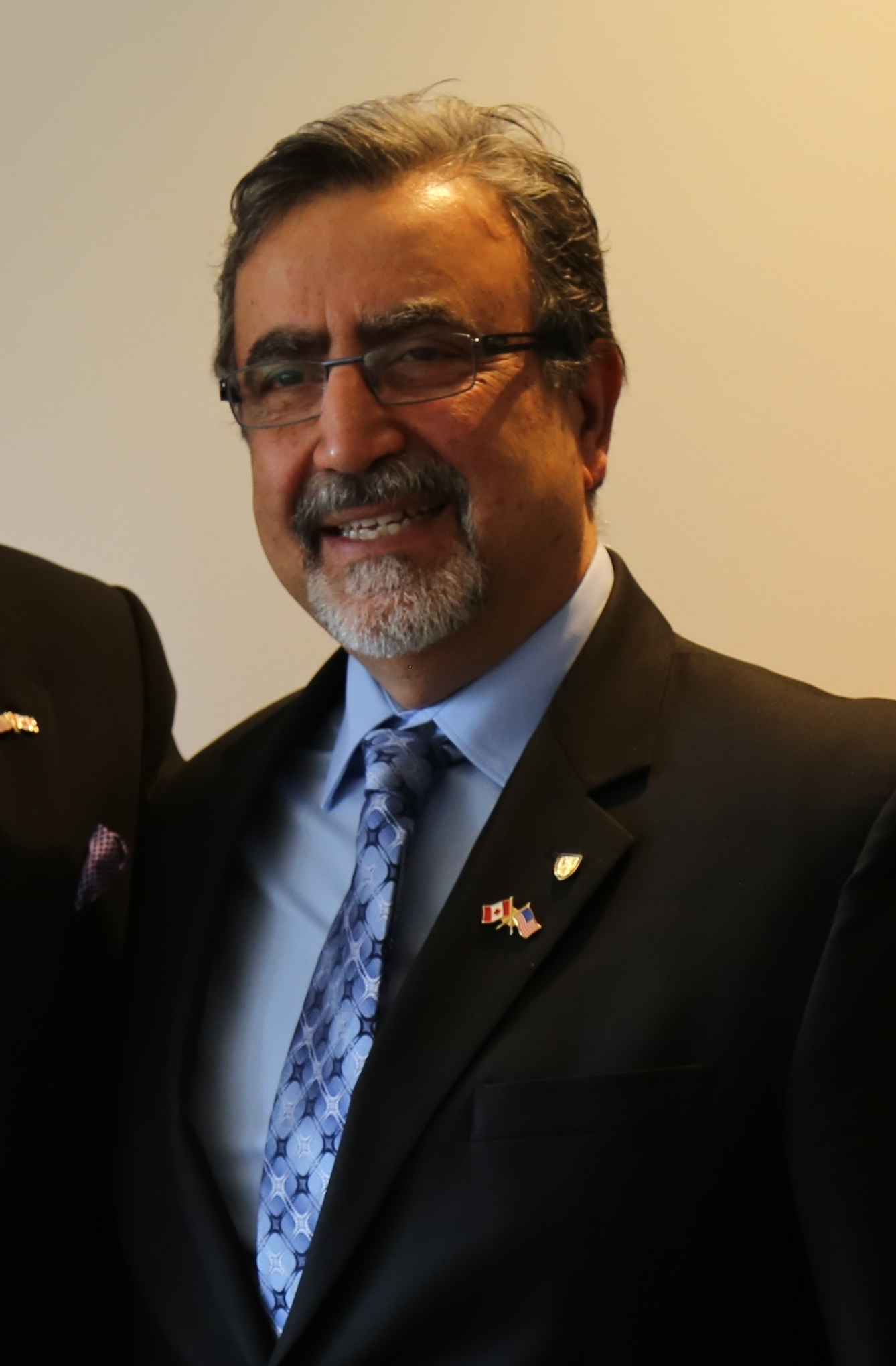
- Hamdullahpur in 2016

6th President and Vice-Chancellor of the University of Waterloo
- In office October 1, 2010 – June 30, 2021
- Chancellor: Tom Jenkins; Dominic Barton
- Preceded by: David Lloyd Johnston
- Succeeded by: Vivek Goel

Personal details
- Born: 1953 or 1954 (age 72–73) Turkey
- Spouse: Cathy Hamdullahpur (née Johnson)
- Children: 2 sons (Brian, Kevin)
- Education: Bachelor’s and Master’s degrees in mechanical engineering PhD in chemical engineering
- Alma mater: Istanbul Technical University; Technical University of Nova Scotia
- Occupation: Academic
- Awards: Queen Elizabeth II Diamond Jubilee Medal l’insigne de chevalier des Palmes Académiques; Order of Merit of the Republic of Turkey Order of Canada
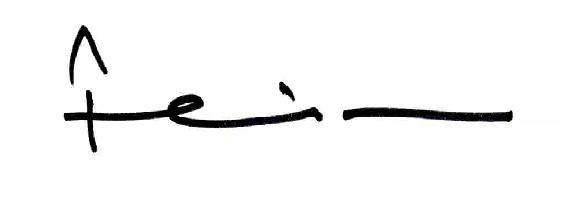
- Signature
- Scientific career
- Fields: mechanical engineering
- Workplaces: Carleton University; University of Waterloo
- Thesis: Two Phase Flow Behaviour in the Freeboard of a Gas Fluidized Bed (1985)

Feridun Hamdullahpur CM (born 1953 or 1954) is the chancellor of International Business University. Previously, he was the president and vice-chancellor of the University of Waterloo. Hamdullahpur was named the sixth president of the University of Waterloo in March 2011. Hamdullahpur's term ended on July 1, 2021, when his successor, Vivek Goel, took office.

== Early life ==
Hamdullahpur was born in Turkey to an Iranian Azerbaijani father and a Turkish mother. He is the youngest of five brothers. His businessman father, Nasri, died of liver disease before Hamdullahpur turned one. His mother, Merziye, raised her five sons in Turkey. He moved from Turkey to Nova Scotia in 1981 where he met his wife, Cathy. Cathy was 21, a fourth-year nursing student at Dalhousie University. They married in Halifax on June 28, 1985, and later traveled to Turkey for a small ceremony with family.

== Education ==
Hamdullahpur attended the Istanbul Technical University earning his undergraduate degree and his master's in mechanical engineering. He moved to Canada to do a PhD at the Technical University of Nova Scotia, which is now part of Dalhousie University.

Prior to being appointed president, Hamdullahpur was Waterloo's vice president academic and provost, a role which he held for just over a year before being appointed interim president. Prior to this, Hamdullahpur held various roles at Carleton University in Ottawa, Ontario, Canada.

== Career ==
After completing his time as president and vice-chancellor of the University of Waterloo, Hamdullahpur continues to serve on several boards, including as a board director for AMTD Group of which he started a relationship with the overall group since 2015 as an Independent Chairman of the Firmwide Executive Management Committee. He also currently serves as a member of ApplyBoard's Canadian Advisory Board and as a member of the Honorary Treasurer for the Association of Commonwealth Universities.

He was appointed to the Order of Canada in 2022. Hamdullaphar is also the publisher and director of L'Officiel and The Art Newspaper, subsidiaries of AMTD.

== See also ==
- List of University of Waterloo people
