= Elod Gyenge =

Chemical engineer

Elod Lajos Gyenge is a professor of Chemical and Biological Engineering at the faculty of Applied Science in University of British Columbia in Vancouver, BC, Canada. He is also an associate member of the Clean Energy Research Center of UBC Vancouver campus. Gyenge has been nominated for several teaching and research awards including Japanese Society for Promotion of Science (JSPS) Fellowship at Osaka University and the recipient of the distinguished Elisabeth and Leslie Gould Endowed Professorship at UBC from 2007 to 2014. His research has been toward development of electrochemical systems such as fuel cells, batteries and electrosynthesis systems. He is also an appointed professor in the engineering school of Osaka University in Japan.

He is also the co-founder of Agora Energy Technologies, a company that he co-founded with his wife Dr Christina Gyenge. The company is developing an innovative electrochemical energy storage system based on CO_{2}-capture and recycling. In 2021 the company received the 2021 Keeling Curve Prize for Capture & Utilization and first prize in the Hello Tomorrow global DeepTech competition against 5,000 entrants from 128 countries. The company also was the recipient of the Asian Alibaba Entrepreneur Fund Award in 2020.

== Career and research contributions ==
Gyenge immigrated to Canada in 1993 and received his MASc in 1995 from the University of the British Columbia in Vancouver. He received his PhD from the University of British Columbia under the supervision of professor Colin Oloman. After Professor Oloman retired in 2001, he replaced his advisor's position as an assistant professor of electrochemical engineering.

His research program focuses on discovering highly active, durable and cost-effective electrocatalysts nanomaterials and to integrate those catalyst particles with the electrode and cell designs of the electrochemical systems such as fuel cells or batteries to develop high-performance electrochemical devices and electrosynthesis processes. Only a selected commercially attractive systems are being studies at his research team including various fuel cells (H_{2}, borohydride, methanol, formic acid), metal-air and novel redox flow batteries (e.g., using CO_{2}), hydrogen peroxide electrosynthesis, graphene electrochemical synthesis and applications, and CO_{2}-based power sources.

== Selected publications ==
- E.L. Gyenge, ‘Redox Flow Battery with Carbon Dioxide based Redox Couple’ US Patent, (2020).
- F.D. Mayer, P. Hosseini-Benhangi, C.M. Sanchez-Sanchez, E. Asselin, E.L. Gyenge, ‘Scanning Electrochemical Microscopy Screening of CO_{2} Electroreduction Activities and Selectivities of Catalyst Arrays’, Communications Chemistry (Nature Publishing Group), 3, 1-9 (2020). https://doi.org/10.1038/s42004-020-00399-6
- Y.Dong, et al., ‘Ammonia Thermal Treatment toward Topological Defects in Porous Carbon for Enhanced CO_{2} Electroreduction’, Advanced Materials, 32, 2001300 (2020). https://doi.org/10.1002/adma.202001300
- Y.P. Wijaya, R.D. Putra, K.J. Smith, C.S. Kim, E.L. Gyenge, ‘Guaiacol Hydrogenation in Methanesulfonic Acid using a Stirred Slurry Electrocatalytic Reactor’, ACS Sustainable Chemistry and Engineering, 9, 13164-13175 (2021). https://doi.org/10.1021/acssuschemeng.1c03332
- W.Li, A. Bonakdarpour, E.L. Gyenge, D.P. Wilkinson, ‘Production of Hydrogen Peroxide for Drinking Water Treatment in a PEM Electrolyzer at Near-Neutral pH’, J.Electrochem.Soc. 167, 044502 (2020) https://doi.org/10.1149/1945-7111/ab6fee
