= McKinsey & Company =

Global management consulting firm

- Type: Private
- Industry: Management consulting
- Founded: 1926; 100 years ago
- Founder: James O. McKinsey
- Headquarters: New York City, US
- Area served: Worldwide
- Key people: Bob Sternfels, Global Managing Partner
- Revenue: ▲$16 billion (2023)
- Number of employees: 38,000 (2025)
- Website: mckinsey.com

McKinsey & Company (informally McKinsey or McK) is an American multinational strategy and management consulting firm that offers professional services to corporations, governments, and other organizations. Founded in 1926 by James O. McKinsey, McKinsey is the oldest and largest of the "MBB" strategy consultancy firms. The firm mainly focuses on the finances and operations of their clients.

Under the direction of Marvin Bower, McKinsey expanded into Europe during the 1940s and 1950s. In the 1960s, McKinsey's Fred Gluck—along with Boston Consulting Group's Bruce Henderson, Bill Bain at Bain & Company, and Harvard Business School's Michael Porter—initiated a program designed to transform corporate culture. A 1975 publication by McKinsey's John L. Neuman introduced the business practice of "overhead value analysis" that contributed to a downsizing trend that eliminated many jobs in middle management.

McKinsey has been the subject of significant controversy and is the subject of multiple criminal investigations into its business practices. The company has been criticized for its role promoting OxyContin use during the opioid crisis in North America, its work with Enron, and its work for authoritarian regimes like Saudi Arabia and Russia. The criminal investigation by the US Justice Department, with a grand jury to determine charges, is into its role in the opioid crisis and obstruction of justice related to its activities in the sector. McKinsey works with some of the largest fossil fuel producing governments and companies, including to increase fossil fuel demand.

McKinsey has a notoriously competitive hiring process, and is widely seen as one of the most selective employers in the world. McKinsey recruits primarily from top-ranked business schools, and was one of the first management consultancies to recruit a limited number of candidates with advanced academic degrees (e.g., PhD) as well as deep field expertise, particularly those who have demonstrated business acumen and analytical skills. McKinsey publishes a business magazine, the McKinsey Quarterly.

== History ==
=== Early history ===
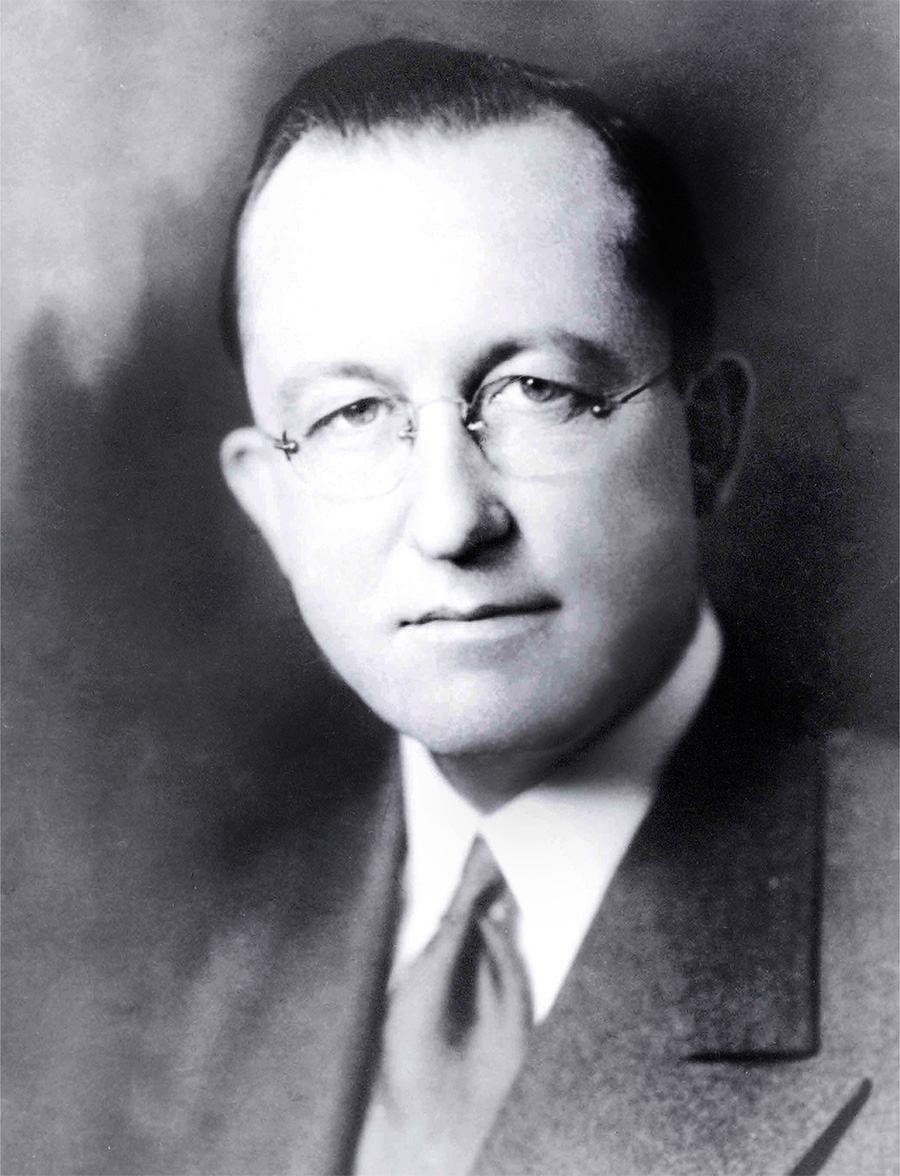
James O. McKinsey (1889–1937), founder of the company

McKinsey & Company was founded in Chicago under the name James O. McKinsey & Company in 1926 by James O. McKinsey, a professor of accounting at the University of Chicago. He conceived the idea after he had witnessed inefficiencies in military suppliers while he was working for the United States Army Ordnance Department. The firm called itself an "accounting and management firm" and started out giving advice on using accounting principles as a management tool. McKinsey's first partners were AT Kearney, hired in 1929, (Note: Some sources say he was hired in 1930, instead of 1929.) and Marvin Bower, hired in 1933. (Note: Some sources say he was hired in 1932, while others say that they first met in 1932, but he was not hired until 1933.)

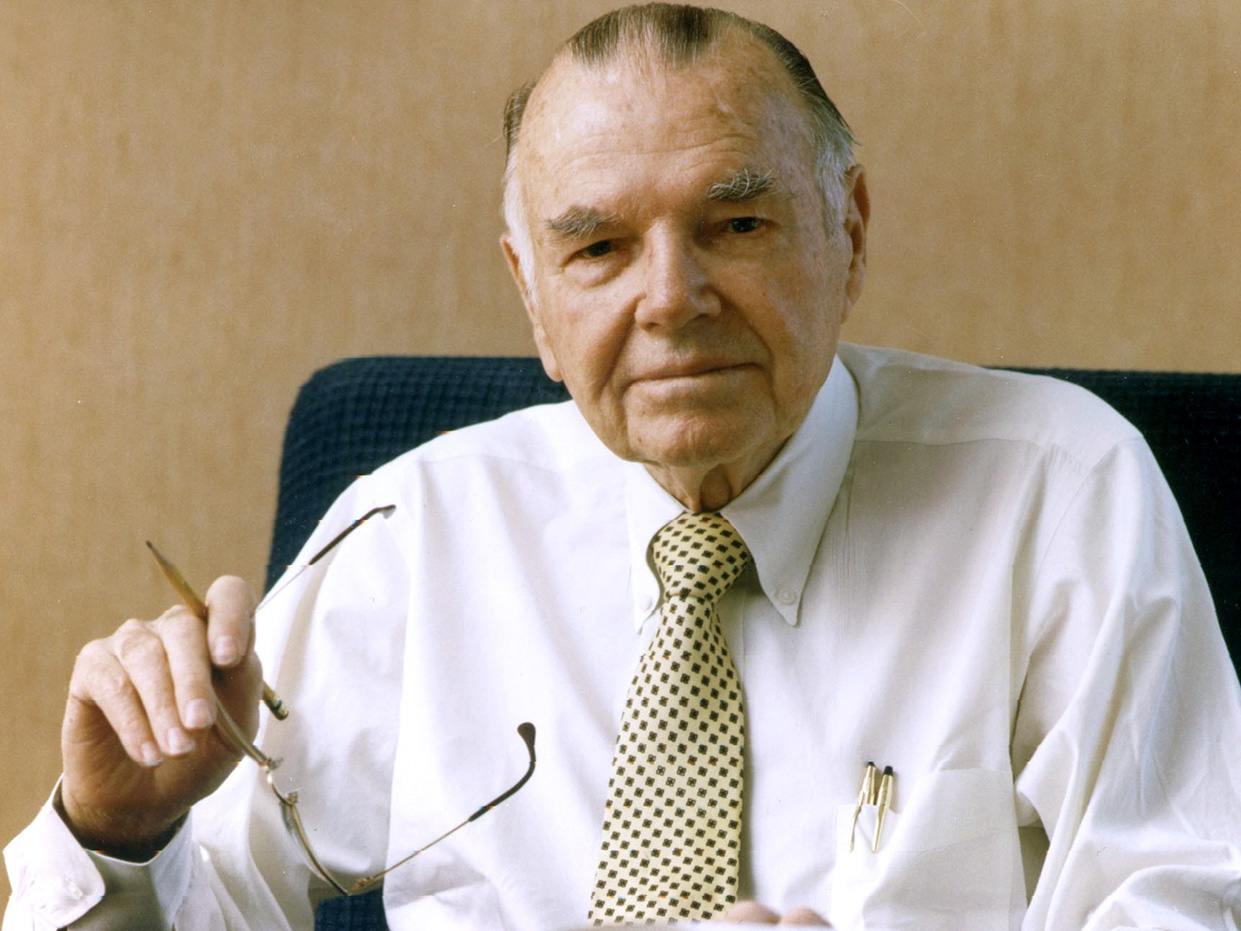
Marvin Bower, founder of modern-day McKinsey and its corporate culture

Bower is credited with establishing McKinsey's values and principles in 1937, based on his experience as a lawyer. The firm developed an "up or out" policy, where consultants who are not promoted are asked to leave. In 1937, Bower established a set of rules: that consultants should put the interests of clients before McKinsey's revenues, not discuss client affairs, tell the truth even if it means challenging the client's opinion, and only perform work that is both necessary and that McKinsey can do well. Bower created the firm's principle of only working with CEOs, which was later expanded to CEOs of subsidiaries and divisions. He also created McKinsey's principle of only working with clients the firm felt would follow its advice. Bower also established the firm's language.

In 1932, the company opened its second office in New York City. In 1935, James McKinsey left the firm temporarily to be the chairman and CEO of client Marshall Field's. In 1935, McKinsey merged with accounting firm Scovell, Wellington & Company, creating the New York-based McKinsey, Wellington & Co. and splitting off the accounting practice into Chicago-based Wellington & Company. A Wellington project that accounted for 55 percent of McKinsey, Wellington & Company's billings was about to expire and Kearney and Bower had disagreements about how to run the firm. Bower wanted to expand nationally and hire young business school graduates, whereas Kearney wanted to stay in Chicago and hire experienced accountants.

In 1937, James O. McKinsey died after catching pneumonia. This led to the division of McKinsey, Wellington & Company in 1939. The accounting practice returned to Scovell, Wellington & Company, while the management engineering practice was split into McKinsey & Company and McKinsey, Kearney & Company. Bower had partnered with Guy Crockett from Scovell Wellington, who invested in the new McKinsey & Company and became managing partner, while Marvin Bower is credited with founding the firm's principles and strategy as his deputy. The New York office purchased exclusive rights to the McKinsey name from the former McKinsey Chicago office which was separated with AT Kearney in 1946.

=== Years of growth ===
McKinsey & Company grew quickly in the 1940s and 1950s, especially in Europe. It had 88 staff in 1951 and more than 200 by the 1960s, including 37 in London by 1966. In the same year, McKinsey had six offices in major US cities, including San Francisco, Cleveland, Los Angeles and Washington D.C., as well as six abroad. These foreign offices were primarily in Europe, such as in London, Paris, and Amsterdam, as well as in Melbourne. By this time, one third of the company's revenues originated from its European offices. Guy Crockett stepped down as managing director in 1959, and Marvin Bower was elected in his place. McKinsey's profit-sharing, executive and planning committees were formed in 1951. The organization's client base expanded especially among governments, defense contractors, blue-chip companies and military organizations in the post–World War II era. McKinsey became a private corporation with shares owned exclusively by McKinsey employees in 1956.

After Bower stepped down in 1967, the firm's revenues declined. New competitors like the Boston Consulting Group and Bain & Company created increased competition for McKinsey by marketing specific branded products, such as the Growth–Share Matrix, and by selling their industry expertise. In 1971, McKinsey created the Commission on Firm Aims and Goals, which found that McKinsey had become too focused on geographic expansion and lacked adequate industry knowledge. The commission advised that McKinsey slow its growth and develop industry specialties.

In 1975, John L. Neuman, a McKinsey consultant at the time, published "Make Overhead Cuts That Last" in Harvard Business Review, in which he introduced new rules for scientific management such as "overhead valuation analysis" (OVA). OVA guided McKinsey's "path to downsizing", responding to the "mid-century corporation's excessive reliance on middle management". Neuman wrote that the "process, though swift, is not painless. Since overhead expenses are typically 70% to 85% people-related and most savings come from work-force reductions, cutting overhead does demand some wrenching decisions."

In 1976, Ron Daniel was elected managing director, serving until 1988. Daniel and Fred Gluck helped shift the firm away from its generalist approach by developing 15 specialized working groups within McKinsey called Centers of Competence and by developing practice areas called Strategy, Operations and Organization. Daniel also began McKinsey's knowledge management efforts in 1987. This led to the creation of an IT system that tracked McKinsey engagements, a process to centralize knowledge from each practice area and a resource directory of internal experts." By the end of his tenure in 1988 the firm was growing again and had opened new offices in Rome, Helsinki, São Paulo and Minneapolis.

Fred Gluck was McKinsey's managing director from 1988 to 1994. The firm's revenues doubled during his tenure. He organized McKinsey into 72 "islands of activity" that were organized under seven sectors and seven functional areas. By 1997, McKinsey had grown eightfold over its size in 1977. In 1989 the firm tried to acquire talent in IT services through a $10 million purchase of the Information Consulting Group (ICG), but a culture clash caused 151 out of the 254 ICG staff members to leave by 1993.

In 1994, Rajat Gupta became the first non-American-born partner to be elected as the firm's managing director. By the end of his tenure, McKinsey had grown from 2,900 to 7,700 staff and 58 to 84 locations. He opened new international offices in cities such as Moscow, Beijing and Bangkok. Continuing the structure developed by prior directors, Gupta also created 16 industry groups charged with understanding specific markets and instituted a three-term limit for the managing director. McKinsey created practice areas for manufacturing and business technology in the late 1990s.

McKinsey set up "accelerators" in the 1990s, where the firm accepted stock-based reimbursement to help internet startups; the company performed more than 1,000 e-commerce projects from 1998 to 2000 alone. An October 1, 2000, article in the New York Times described the compulsory mini-courses that McKinsey—and its two largest rivals Boston Consulting and Bain—offered their "hyper-educated" young new recruits. Once completed, these newly certified management consultants would begin their work of "advising the executives of multibillion-dollar companies" on "projects" not related to their academic backgrounds". "Lawyers would help packaged-foods companies develop new products, and physicists would tell Internet start-ups how to stand out from the crowd."

The burst of the dot-com bubble led to a reduction in utilization rates of McKinsey's consultants from 64 to 52 percent. Though McKinsey avoided dismissing any personnel following the decline, the decline in revenues and losses from equity-based payments as stock lost value, together with a recession in 2001, meant the company had to reduce its prices, cut expenses and reduce hiring. In 2001, McKinsey launched several practices that focused on the public and social sector. It took on many public sector or non profit clients on a pro bono basis. By 2002, McKinsey had invested a $35.8 million budget on knowledge management, up from $8.3 million in 1999. Its revenues were 50, 20, and 30 percent from strategy, operations, and technology consulting, respectively.

In 2003, Ian Davis, the head of the London office, was elected to the position of managing director. Davis promised a return to the company's core values after a period in which the firm had expanded rapidly, which some McKinsey consultants felt was a departure from the company's heritage. Also in 2003, the firm established a headquarters for the Asia-Pacific region in Shanghai. By 2004, more than 60 percent of McKinsey's revenues were generated outside the U.S. The company started a Social Sector Office (SSO) in 2008, which is divided into three practices: Global Public Health, Economic Development and Opportunity Creation (EDHOC) and Philanthropy. McKinsey does much of its pro-bono work through the SSO, whereas a Business Technology Office (BTO), founded in 1997, provides consulting on technology strategy. By 2009, the firm consisted of 400 directors (senior partners), up from 151 in 1993. Dominic Barton was elected as managing director, a role he was re-elected for in 2012 and 2015.

=== Recent history ===
Rajat Gupta along with another McKinsey executive, Anil Kumar, were among those convicted in a government investigation into insider trading for sharing inside information with Galleon Group hedge fund owner Raj Rajaratnam. Though McKinsey was not accused of any wrongdoing, the convictions were embarrassing for the firm, since it prides itself on integrity and client confidentiality. McKinsey no longer maintains a relationship with either senior partner.

Senior partner Anil Kumar, described as Gupta's protégé, left the firm after the allegations in 2009, and pleaded guilty in January 2010. While he and other partners had been pitching McKinsey's consulting services to the Galleon Group, Kumar and Rajaratnam reached a private consulting agreement, violating McKinsey's policies on confidentiality. Gupta was convicted in June 2012, of four counts of conspiracy and securities fraud, and acquitted on two counts. In October 2011, he was arrested by the FBI on charges of sharing insider information from these confidential board meetings with Rajaratnam. At least twice, Gupta used a McKinsey phone to call Rajaratnam and retained other perks—an office, assistant, and $6 million retirement salary that year—as a senior partner emeritus.

After the scandal McKinsey instituted new policies and procedures to discourage future indiscretions from consultants, including investigating other partners' ties to Gupta.

In February 2018, Kevin Sneader was elected as managing director. He had a three-year term that began on July 1, 2018. McKinsey has consulted for multiple cities, states and government organizations during the 2019 coronavirus pandemic. During the first four months of the pandemic, McKinsey obtained in excess of $100 million in consulting work, including no-bid contracts with the United States Department of Veterans Affairs and Air Force. The reopening guidelines for Florida's Miami-Dade County, produced with McKinsey's input, were criticized by local media and officials for complexity and lack of clarity.

McKinsey discontinued its investment banking advisory unit in 2021, citing "personnel matters" as the reason. In 2021, McKinsey's Australian office made two acquisitions, Hypothesis, a digital product development company, and Venturetec, an innovation consulting firm. On June 1, 2022, McKinsey announced that it had acquired Caserta, a data engineering firm. In March 2023, McKinsey announced a layoff of 1,400 employees, in a rare job cut of the company.

In February 2026, McKinsey announced that it has handed control of $20bn in assets from its investment arm to Neuberger Berman following a strategic review of the unit, which invests the private wealth of senior staff and partners.

== Organization and services ==
=== Structure ===
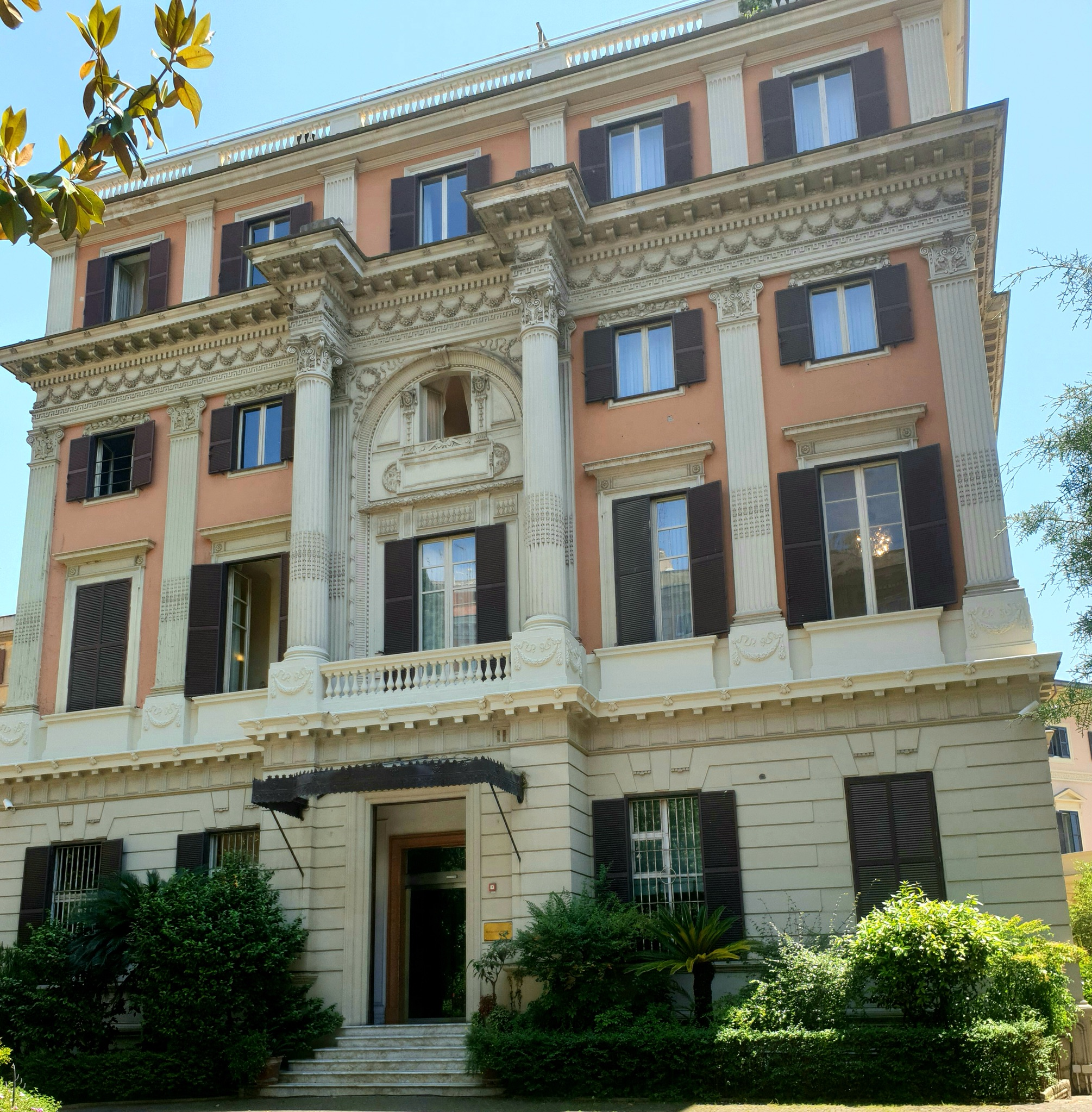
McKinsey office in Rome, Italy

McKinsey & Company was originally organized as a partnership before being legally restructured as a private corporation with shares owned by its partners in 1956. It mimics the structure of a partnership and senior employees are called "partners". The company has a flat hierarchy and each member is assigned a mentor. Since the 1960s, McKinsey's managing director has been elected by a vote of senior directors to work up to three, three-year terms or until reaching the mandatory retirement age of 60. The firm is also managed by a series of committees that each has its own area of responsibility.

By 2013, McKinsey was described as having a decentralized structure, whereby different offices operate similarly but independently. The company's budgeting is centralized, but individual consultants are given a large degree of autonomy. As a global firm McKinsey does not have a traditional "headquarters"; the managing partner chooses his or her home office.

==== List of global managing partners ====
1. James O. McKinsey (1926–1935), Chicago office
2. Guy Crockett (1939–1950)
3. Marvin Bower (1950–1967), New York office
4. Gil Clee (1967–1968)
5. Chester Walton (1968–1976)
6. Alonzo L. McDonald (1973–1976)
7. Ron Daniel (1976–1988)
8. Frederick Gluck (1988–1994), New York office
9. Rajat Gupta (1994–2003), New York office
10. Ian Davis (2003–2009), London office
11. Dominic Barton (2009–2018), London office
12. Kevin Sneader (2018–2021), Hong Kong office
13. Bob Sternfels (2021– ), San Francisco office

=== Consulting services ===
McKinsey & Company provides strategy and management consulting services, such as providing advice on an acquisition, developing a plan to restructure a sales force, creating a new business strategy or providing advice on downsizing, according to the 2013 book, The Firm. The 1999 book, The McKinsey Way said that McKinsey consultants designed and implemented studies to evaluate management decisions using data and interviews to test hypotheses. which were then presented to senior management, typically in a PowerPoint presentation and a booklet.

McKinsey & Company has traditionally charged approximately 25 percent more than competing firms. Its invoices traditionally contain only a single line. A typical McKinsey engagement (called a "study") can last between two and twelve months and involves three to six McKinsey consultants. An engagement is usually managed by a generalist that covers the region the client's headquarters are located in and specialists that have either an industry or functional expertise. Unlike some competing consulting firms, McKinsey does not hold a policy against working for multiple competing companies (although individual consultants are barred from doing so).

=== Recruiting ===
McKinsey & Company was the first management consultancy to hire recent graduates instead of experienced business managers, when it started doing so in 1953. According to a 1997 article in The Observer, McKinsey recruited recent graduates and "imbue[d] them with a religious conviction" in the firm, then cull[ed] through them with its "up-or-out" policy. The "up or out" policy, which was established in 1951, meant that consultants that were not being promoted within the firm were asked to leave. By 1997, about one-fifth of McKinsey's consultants departed under the up or out policy each year. McKinsey's practice of hiring recent graduates and the "up-or-out" philosophy were originally based on Marvin Bower's experiences at the law firm Jones Day in the 1930s, as well as the "Cravath system" used at the law firm Cravath, Swaine and Moore.

In the early 21st century, it has consistently been recognized by Vault as the most prestigious consulting firm employer in the world. In 2018, 800,000 candidates applied for 8,000 jobs. While many recruits have MBAs, by 2009, less than half of the firm's recruits were business majors; by 1999, recruits had advanced degrees in science, medicine, engineering or law.

=== Culture ===
A November 1, 1993, profile story in Fortune magazine said that McKinsey & Company was "the most well-known, most secretive, most high-priced, most prestigious, most consistently successful, most envied, most trusted, most disliked management consulting firm on earth". In the article, McKinsey was cited as claiming that its consultants were not motivated by money, and that partners talked to each other with "a sense of personal affection and admiration". The article described a culture clash that occurred in the early 1990s, leading to the departure of 151 out of the 254 ICG staff members.

In their 1997 book Dangerous Company: Management Consultants and the Businesses They Save and Ruin, authors James O'Shea and Charles Madigan said that McKinsey's culture had often been compared to religion, because of the influence, loyalty and zeal of its members. The firm has a policy against discussing specific client situations. A September 1997 The News Observer story said that McKinsey's internal culture was "collegiate and ruthlessly competitive" and has been described as arrogant. Ethan Rasiel's 1999 book entitled The McKinsey Way, described a culture at McKinsey's whereby members were not supposed to "sell" their services.

The Sunday Times wrote that McKinsey was a pioneer in the industry—the "first firm to hire MBA graduates from the top business schools to staff its projects, rather than relying on older industry personnel." They were still trying to keep a "very low profile public image" in 2005. That year, an article in The Guardian said that McKinsey "hours are long, expectations high and failure not acceptable". According to an October 2009 Reuters article, the firm had a "button-down culture" focused on "playing by the rules". In his 2013 book, The Firm: The Story of McKinsey and Its Secret Influence on American Business, Duff McDonald described how McKinsey's consultants were expected to become a part of the community and recruit clients from church, charitable foundations, board positions and other community involvements. McDonald wrote that McKinsey calls itself "The Firm" and its employees "members". BusinessWeek summarized The Firm's description of McKinsey as a "fading empire, where hubris and changing times have diminished the firm's statures." In his February 2020 in-depth article in The Atlantic, Daniel Markovits argues that McKinsey promotes "intellect and elite credentials" and "Meritocrats" over "directly relevant experience".

== Influence ==
Many of McKinsey's alumni become CEOs of major corporations or hold important government positions. In doing so, they influence the other organizations with McKinsey's values and culture. McKinsey's alumni have been appointed as CEOs or high-level executives. In his 2010 publication, The Lords of Strategy: The Secret Intellectual History of the New Corporate World, business journalist Walter Kiechel traced the roots of a profound change in corporate management to "four mavericks" in the 1960s—Fred Gluck at McKinsey & Company, Boston Consulting Group's Bruce Henderson, Bill Bain at Bain & Company, and Harvard Business School professor, Michael Porter. Kiechel recounted how they "revolutionized the way we think about business, changed the very soul of the corporation, and transformed the way we work," according to the Harvard Business Press synopsis.

McKinsey has been either directly involved in, or closely associated with, a number of notable scandals, involving Enron in 2001, Galleon in 2009, Valeant in 2015, Saudi Arabia in 2018, China in 2018, ICE in 2019, an internal conflict of interest in 2019, and Purdue Pharma in 2019, among others. By 2019, major news outlets, including The New York Times and ProPublica, had raised concerns about McKinsey's business practices.

=== Research and publishing ===
McKinsey & Company consultants regularly publish books, research and articles about business and management. The firm spends $50–$100 million a year on research. McKinsey was one of the first organizations to fund management research, when it founded the Foundation for Management Research in 1955. The firm began publishing a business magazine, The McKinsey Quarterly, in 1964. It funds the McKinsey Global Institute, which studies global economic trends and was founded in 1990. It also launched the McKinsey Institute for Black Economic Mobility in 2020 to fund research focused on advancing inclusive growth & racial equity globally. Many consultants are contributors to the Harvard Business Review. McKinsey consultants published only two books from 1960 to 1980, then more than 50 from 1980 to 1996. McKinsey's publications and research give the firm a "quasi-academic" image.

A McKinsey book, In Search of Excellence, was published in 1982. It featured eight characteristics of successful businesses based on an analysis of 43 top performing companies. It marked the beginning of McKinsey's shift from accounting to "softer" aspects of management, like skills and culture. According to David Guest from King's College, In Search of Excellence became popular among business managers because it was easy to read, well-marketed and some of its core messages were valid. However, it was disliked by academics because of flaws in its methodology. Additionally, a 1984 analysis by BusinessWeek found that many of those companies identified as "excellent" in the book no longer met the criteria only two years later.

A 1997 article and a book it published in 2001 on "The War for Talent" prompted academics and the business community to start focusing more on talent management. The authors found that the best-performing companies were "obsessed" with acquiring and managing the best talent. They advocated that companies rank employees by their performance and promote "stars", while targeting under-performers for improvement or layoffs. After the book was published, Enron, a company which followed many of its principles, was involved in a scandal that led to its bankruptcy. In May 2001, a Stanford professor wrote a paper critical of the "War on Talent" arguing that it prioritized individuals at the expense of the larger organization.

McKinsey consultants published Creative Destruction in 2001. The book suggested that CEOs need to be willing to change or rebuild a company, rather than protect what they have created. It found that out of the first S&P 500 list from 1957, only 74 were still in business by 1998. The New York Times said it "makes a cogent argument that in times of rampant, uncertain change ... established companies are handcuffed by success." In 2009, McKinsey consultants published The Alchemy of Growth, which established three "horizons" for growth: core enhancements, new growth platforms and options.

In February 2011, McKinsey surveyed 1,300 US private-sector employers on their expected response to the Affordable Care Act (ACA). Thirty percent of respondents said they anticipated they would probably or definitely stop offering employer sponsored health coverage after the ACA went into effect in 2014. These results, published in June 2011 in the McKinsey Quarterly, became "a useful tool for critics of the ACA and a deep annoyance for defenders of the law" according to an article in Time magazine. Supporters of healthcare reform argued the survey far surpassed estimates by the Congressional Budget Office and insisted that McKinsey disclose the survey's methodology. Two weeks after publishing the survey results, McKinsey released the contents of the survey including the questionnaire and 206 pages of survey data. In its accompanying statement, McKinsey said it was intended to capture the attitude of employers at a certain point in time, not make a prediction.

Since 1990, McKinsey has been publishing Valuation: Measuring and Managing the Value of Companies, a textbook on valuation. In 2022, McKinsey senior partners Carolyn Dewar, Scott Keller, and Vikram Malhotra authored the book CEO Excellence, which was published by Scribner.

==== Environmental consulting ====
Marginal abatement cost curves attempt to compare the financial costs of different options for reducing pollution in a region and are used in emissions trading, policy discussions and incentive programs. McKinsey & Company released its first marginal abatement cost (MAC) curve for greenhouse gas emissions in February 2007, which was updated to version two in January 2009. McKinsey & Company's MAC curve has become the most widely used, and is the basis for McKinsey's consulting on climate change and sustainability. McKinsey's curve predicts negative cost abatement strategies, which has been controversial among economists. The International Association for Energy Economics said in The Energy Journal that McKinsey's cost-curve was popular among policymakers, because it suggests they can take "bold action towards improving energy efficiency without imposing costs on society."

In a 2010 report, the Rainforest Foundation UK said McKinsey's cost curve methodology was misleading for policy decisions regarding the Reduced Emissions from Deforestation and Forest Degradation (REDD) program. The report argued that McKinsey's calculations exclude certain implementation and governance costs, which makes it favor industrial uses of forests while discouraging subsistence projects. Greenpeace said the curve has allowed Indonesia and Guyana to win financial incentives from the United Nations by creating inflated estimates of current deforestation so they could demonstrate reductions in comparison. McKinsey said they had made it clear in the cost-curve publications that cost curves do not translate "mechanically" into policy implications and that policymakers should consider "many other factors" before introducing new laws.

In April 2022, in the report "Global Energy Perspective" the company predicted that fossil fuels use will peak between 2023–2025 and in 2050 fossil fuels will account for 43% of energy consumption. Emissions will peak in all scenarios before 2030. However, the report of September 2024, said that fossil fuel consumption is expected to plateau between 2025 and 2035, and they will continue to play a major role accounting for 40%-60% of energy supply by 2050. Emissions will peak in 2025–2035. The report mention "a more challenging geopolitical landscape", rising electricity demand, especially from Artificial intelligence, some technical problems that are complicating the transition. The low cost of renewables can make them less profitable, so regulation can be required for adoption. The company also created a new report "Global Materials Perspective". It says that the energy transition require intensive mining of many materials, so even as the mining of coal will be reduced, the overall emissions from the mining and metal industry will decline only from 15% to 13% by 2035.

== Significant consulting projects ==
McKinsey & Company's founder, James O. McKinsey, introduced the concept of budget planning as a management framework in his fifth book Budgetary Control in 1922. The firm's first client was the treasurer of Armour & Company, who, along with other early McKinsey clients, had read Budgetary Control. In 1931 McKinsey created a methodology for analyzing a company called the General Survey Outline (GSO), which was established based on ideas introduced in the 1924 book Business Administration. It was also known as the Banker's Survey, because McKinsey's clients who used it in the 1930s were predominantly banks. After the Wagner Act gave certain rights to employees to organize into unions in 1935, McKinsey started consulting corporations on employee relations. Later in the 1950s, the work of a McKinsey consultant on compensation was influential in "skyrocketing executive pay". It also helped many companies such as Heinz, IBM, and Hoover expand into Europe.

In the 1940s, McKinsey helped many corporations convert into wartime production for World War II. It also helped organize NASA into an organization that relies heavily on contractors in 1958. McKinsey created a report in 1953 for Dwight D. Eisenhower that was used to guide government appointments. In 1973, McKinsey & Company led a project for a consortium of grocery chains represented by the U.S. Supermarket Ad Hoc Committee on a Uniform Grocery Product Code to create the barcode. According to the book Business Research Methods, the barcode became commonplace after a study by McKinsey persuaded Kroger to adopt it.

In the 1970s and 1980s, McKinsey helped European companies change their organizational structure to M-form (Multidivisional Form), which organizes the company into semi-autonomous divisions that function around a product, industry or customer, rather than a function or expertise. In the 1980s, AT&T reduced investments in cell towers due to McKinsey's prediction that there would only be 900,000 cell phone subscribers by 2000. According to The Firm this was "laughably off the mark" from the 109 million cellular subscribers by 2000. At the time cell phones were bulky and expensive. In 1999, McKinsey was hired by Sinochem to improve Sinochem's management and internal controls. This was the first time a central state-owned enterprise of China had hired a foreign consulting firm.

The firm helped the Dutch government facilitate a turnaround for Hoogovens, the world's largest steel company as of 2013, through a $1 billion bankruptcy bailout. It also implemented a turnaround for the city of Glasgow, which had problems with unemployment and crime. McKinsey created the corporate structure for NationsBank, when it was still a small company known as North Carolina National Bank. McKinsey was hired by General Motors to do a large-scale re-organization to help it compete with Japanese auto-makers. The book The Firm said it was an "unmitigated disaster" because McKinsey focused on corporate structure, whereas GM needed to compete with Japanese automakers through manufacturing process improvement. A McKinsey consultant said GM did not follow their advice.

A 2002 article in BusinessWeek said that a series of bankruptcies of McKinsey clients, such as Swissair, Kmart, and Global Crossing, in the 1990s raised questions as to whether McKinsey was responsible or had a lapse in judgement. McKinsey recommended that Swissair avoid high operating costs in its home country by developing partnerships with airlines based in other regions. In order to attract partners, Swissair acquired more than $1 billion in shares of other airlines, many of which were failing. This led to huge losses and bankruptcy for Swissair.

As part of a lawsuit against Allstate, 13,000 McKinsey documents were released, showing that McKinsey recommended that Allstate reduce payouts to insurance claimants by offering low settlements, delaying processing to wear out claimants through attrition, and fighting customers that protest in court. Allstate's profits doubled over ten years after adopting McKinsey's strategy, but it also led to lawsuits alleging they were cheating claimants out of legitimate insurance claims.

=== Controversial clients and association with authoritarian regimes ===
==== Fossil fuel companies ====
McKinsey works and has worked with many of the largest fossil fuel producing governments and companies. These include the largest oil company, Saudi Aramco, as well as Shell and BP. The company has stated that "fossil fuels will continue to be a part of the energy mix to meet the world's energy needs". McKinsey internal forecasting in 2021 found that emissions from their clients would lead to 3 to 5 degrees of warming, that their client portfolio included "more than half of the world's worst polluters" and that their work on sustainability projects was "being used to launder the Firm's reputation". McKinsey works on the Oil Demand Sustainability Programme (ODSP), the Saudi Arabia government program designed to increase demand for fossil fuels in poorer countries in Africa and Asia.

==== Role in US Immigration and Customs Enforcement (ICE) ====
McKinsey stopped working for US Immigration and Customs Enforcement (ICE) after it was disclosed that the firm had done more than $20 million in consulting work for the agency. McKinsey managing partner Kevin Sneader said the contract, not widely known within the company until The New York Times reported it, had "rightly raised" concerns. In 2019, The New York Times and ProPublica reported on newly uncovered documents which showed that McKinsey, as part of its work with ICE, proposed cuts in spending on food and medical care for migrants. McKinsey also advocated for an acceleration of the deportation process, causing concerns among ICE staff that the due process rights of the migrants would be violated. Previously, McKinsey managing partner Kevin Sneader had claimed that McKinsey had done no work for ICE in terms of developing and implementing immigration policy; the uncovered documents showed that to be false.

==== Role in Saudi clampdown on dissidents ====
In October 2018, in the wake of the assassination of Jamal Khashoggi, a Saudi dissident and journalist, The New York Times reported that McKinsey had identified the most prominent Saudi dissidents on Twitter and that the Saudi government subsequently repressed the dissidents and their families. One of the dissidents, Khalid al-Alkami, was arrested. Another dissident identified by McKinsey; Omar Abdulaziz in Canada, had two brothers imprisoned by the Saudi authorities, and his cell phone hacked. McKinsey issued a statement, saying "We are horrified by the possibility, however remote, that [the report] could have been misused. We have seen no evidence to suggest that it was misused, but we are urgently investigating how and with whom the document was shared." In December 2018, The New York Times reported that "the kingdom is a such a vital client for the firm—the source of nearly 600 projects from 2011 to 2016 alone—that McKinsey chose to participate in a major Saudi investment conference in October 2018 even after the killing and dismemberment of a Washington Post columnist by Saudi agents." On February 12, 2019, the European Parliament Greens/EFA group presented a motion for a resolution on the situation on women's rights defenders in Saudi Arabia denouncing the involvement of foreign public relations companies in representing Saudi Arabia and handling its public image, particularly McKinsey & Company.

==== Saudi Arabian influence disclosure ====
In February 2024, McKinsey was questioned in court about possible violations of federal disclosure rules. The company, along with three other consulting firms, was accused of refusing to provide information about their work for Saudi Arabia's Public Investment Fund and failing to disclose themselves as agents of the Saudi government. Representatives of the firms warned that their staff could face jail if they complied with the subpoenas, breaking strict rules imposed by Saudi Arabia on what information consulting firms can share with the US government.

==== Support of authoritarian regimes ====
McKinsey's business and policy support for authoritarian regimes came under scrutiny in December 2018, in the wake of a lavish company retreat in China held adjacent to prisons where thousands of Uyghurs were being detained without cause. In December 2021, NBC News reported McKinsey's connection to a manufacturing facility owned by DJI, a drone maker sanctioned by the United States Department of the Treasury for alleged complicity in aiding the persecution of Uyghurs in China. In the preceding few years, McKinsey's clients included Saudi Arabia's absolute monarchy, Turkey's autocratic leader Recep Tayyip Erdogan, ousted former president of Ukraine Viktor Yanukovych, and several Chinese and Russian companies under sanctions.

==== China ====
In 2015, McKinsey's think tank, the Urban China Initiative, advised the Chinese government on its 13th five-year plan and its Made in China 2025 policy. As part of a project for China's National Development and Reform Commission, McKinsey's think tank advised the Chinese government to "deepen co-operation between business and the military and push foreign companies out of sensitive industries," according to a 2024 Financial Times report. In response, US legislators Marco Rubio and Michael McCaul stated that McKinsey had undermined US security and called for it to be banned from securing US federal government contracts. In October 2024, several US lawmakers called on the United States Department of Justice to investigate whether McKinsey misrepresented its work with Chinese government entities, including state-owned enterprises. On October 18, 2024, the US House of Representatives Select Committee on the CCP reported that "McKinsey Equipped America's Foremost Adversary and Misrepresented Work for the Chinese Military Under Oath".

==== Work with Russian arms manufacturers ====
McKinsey is reported to have provided consulting services for the Russian state-owned enterprise Rostec, which is responsible for manufacturing missile engines used during Russia's war on Ukraine. According to January 2023 reporting from Die Zeit, McKinsey consultants would provide consulting services to Gazprom and Rostec while in Germany on behalf of the German Federal Ministry of Defence. According to US Senator Maggie Hassan McKinsey has displayed a "pattern of behavior" that raised "grave concerns about conflicts of interest". McKinsey has also done work for Sberbank, VTB bank, Gazprom, and Rosneft, which are all closely tied to the Kremlin.

== Controversies ==
The firm has been associated with a number of notable scandals, including the collapse of Enron in 2001, the 2008 financial crisis, and facilitating state capture in South Africa. It has also drawn controversy for involvement with Purdue Pharma, US Immigration and Customs Enforcement, and authoritarian regimes. Michael Forsythe and Walt Bogdanich, reporters for The New York Times, wrote a book in 2022 entitled When McKinsey Comes to Town about the controversially unethical work history of the company.

=== Enron ===
Enron was the creation of Jeff Skilling, a McKinsey consultant of 21 years, who was jailed after Enron reportedly used McKinsey on 20 different projects, and McKinsey consultants had "used Enron as their sandbox." Prior to the Enron scandal, McKinsey helped it shift from an oil and gas production company into an electric commodities trader, which led to significant growth in profits and revenues. According to The Independent, there was "no suggestion that McKinsey was complicit in the subsequent scandal, [but] critics say the arrogance of Enron's leaders is emblematic of the McKinsey culture." The government did not investigate McKinsey, who said they did not provide advice on Enron's accounting. The Wall Street Journal questioned McKinsey's "liability" and its "close relationship with Enron", and a 2002 BusinessWeek article suggested that they had ignored warning signs.

In his July 2002 in-depth BusinessWeek article on the aftermath of the Enron scandal, John Bryne wrote that McKinsey had been a "key architect of the strategic thinking that made Enron a Wall Street darling. In books, articles, and essays, its partners regularly stamped their imprimatur on many of Enron's strategies and practices, helping to position the energy giant as a corporate innovator worthy of emulation. The firm may not be the subject of any investigations, but its close involvement with Enron raises the question of whether McKinsey, like some other professional firms, ignored warning flags in order to keep an important account." BusinessWeek described how McKinsey's culture had changed, as the "number of partners grew from 427 to 891" making it a "less personal place". According to the article, "some current and former McKinsey consultants" said that McKinsey had lost their "ingrained values" that used to guide the firm. Citing the example of the dot-com bubble, McKinsey had begun to have "less prestigious companies" as clients and had allowed "its focus on building agenda-shaping relationships with top management at leading companies to slip." Additionally, "there was a noticeable tilt toward bringing in revenue at the expense of developing knowledge." McKinsey denied this. McKinsey also denied giving Enron advice on financing issues or having suspicions that Enron was using improper accounting methods.

=== 2008 financial crisis ===
McKinsey is said to have played a significant role in the 2008 financial crisis by promoting the securitization of mortgage assets and encouraged the banks to fund their balance sheets with debt, driving up risk, which "poisoned the global financial system and precipitated the 2008 credit meltdown". Furthermore, McKinsey advised Allstate Insurance to purposely give low offers to claimants. The Huffington Post revealed that the strategy was to make claims "so expensive and so time-consuming that lawyers would start refusing to help clients." Next to this, 2016 McKinsey partner Navdeep Arora was convicted for illegally depleting State Farm of over $500,000 over a period of 8 years, in collaboration with a State Farm employee.

=== Valeant ===
Valeant, a Canadian pharmaceutical company investigated by the SEC in 2015, has been accused of improper accounting, and that it used predatory price hikes to boost growth. The Financial Times states that "Valeant's downfall is not exactly McKinsey's fault but its fingerprints are everywhere." Three out of six senior executives were recent ex-McKinsey employees, as well as the chair of the 'talent and compensation' committee. MIO Partners was a private investor of Valeant and McKinsey consulted Valeant on drug prices and acquisitions.

=== Role in opioid epidemic ===
McKinsey advised opioid makers on how to "turbocharge" sales of OxyContin, proposed strategies to counter the emotional messages from mothers with teenagers who overdosed on OxyContin, and helped opioid makers circumvent regulation. The firm also advised Purdue Pharma to offer pharmacies rebates based on the number of overdoses and addictions they caused. In 2019, McKinsey projected that over 2,400 CVS customers would have an overdose or become reliant on opioids. McKinsey estimated that a rebate of $14,810 per "event" would mean that Purdue would have to pay CVS $36.8 million that year. In February 2021, McKinsey reached agreements with attorneys general in 49 states, five U.S. territories, and the District of Columbia. Across the settlements, the firm agreed to pay nearly $600 million to settle investigations into its role in promoting sales of OxyContin. McKinsey has since apologized for its advice to opioid makers.

Records show that McKinsey worked for Purdue Pharma and other opioid makers in a 15-year period, from 2004 to 2019. During 2018 and 2019, McKinsey collected at least $400 million consulting pharmaceutical companies. McKinsey advised Mallinckrodt, the largest manufacturer of generic opioids, as well as Endo International for which McKinsey consulted on marketing Opana. McKinsey's consultation grew Endo into a leading generics manufacturer. McKinsey recommended "targeting and influencing" doctors who treat back pain in elderly and long-term care patients. In February 2021, McKinsey paid $600 million to settle investigations into its role in promoting sales of OxyContin and fuelling the greater opioid epidemic. In April 2022, the New York Times reported that McKinsey had frequently allowed partners and other consultants to work for both government clients, such as the FDA, and pharmaceutical clients, such as Purdue. These actions violated McKinsey's own internal ethical guidelines.

In December 2023, Reuters reported that McKinsey had agreed to pay an additional $78 million to settle claims with health insurers McKinsey's consulting helped to fuel "an epidemic of opioid addiction through its work for drug companies". Reuters reported the settlement would be the last in a series and that McKinsey "admitted to no wrongdoing". In 2024, the company became the subject of a criminal investigation by the US Justice Department into its role in advising opioid manufacturers how to boost sales. A grand jury was convened to determine charges to be brought against the firm. It is also under investigation for obstruction of justice during the period that concerns were mounting about their activities. The firm settled the investigation in December 2024, for a sum of $650 million and with conditions that it cannot market controlled substances for a period of five years. This agreement was filed in federal court in Abingdon, Virginia, with aims to resolve criminal charges which were brought up as part of the latest corporate prosecution concerning the marketing of addictive painkillers.

=== Rikers Island jail complex ===
New York City paid McKinsey $27.5 million between 2014 and 2017 to reduce prison assaults in Rikers Island; but the violence grew and the city abandoned many of the firm's recommendations. The consultancy's alleged failings included not soliciting the views of inmates or clinic staff; using the encrypted messaging app Wickr that deletes messages, allegedly to avoid transparency; initiatives involving the expanded use of Tasers, shotguns and K9 patrol dogs; replacing troublesome inmates with more accommodating ones in the test area, which skewed the data in favor of the project; the use of ineffective data-analytics software; and spreadsheet errors that inflated the baseline rate of violence, against which the project was measured.

McKinsey advised New York City's Rikers Island jail complex and tested an anti-violence strategy named "Restart" which occurred in Rikers housing units. Jail administrators reported that the strategy resulted in violent crimes dropping more than 70% inside the Rikers housing units. Later, it was found that McKinsey consultants and jail officials rigged the program by grouping compliant inmates into the housing units, and that violent crimes including "slashings and stabbings" increased over 1000% from 2011 to 2016.

=== Fine for insider trading by investment affiliate ===
In February 2019, The New York Times ran a series of articles about McKinsey and the in-house hedge fund it operates – McKinsey Investment Office, or MIO Partners. The articles claimed that there was "potential for undisclosed conflicts of interest between the fund's investments and the advice the firm sells to clients", since the hedge fund could benefit from the inside knowledge obtained through management consulting services. The firm responded that "MIO and McKinsey employ separate staffs. MIO staff have no nonpublic knowledge of McKinsey clients. For the vast majority of assets under management, decisions about specific investments are made by third-party managers."

In 2019, McKinsey paid the Justice Department $15 million from fees earned to settle allegations relating to failure to disclose potential conflict in three bankruptcy cases that the firm had advised. In 2021, MIO Partners, was fined $18 million by the SEC, which said some of the same people making investment decisions for MIO Partners were McKinsey employees who had visibility into confidential information for companies for which McKinsey was consulting. The SEC claimed that MIO Partners had advanced knowledge of upcoming mergers, bankruptcy, and financial results announcements for companies that the firm was consulting.

=== Accusations of conflicts of interest in US bankruptcies ===
In January 2022, the Second U.S. Circuit Court of Appeals in Manhattan revived a lawsuit against McKinsey & Co. filed by retired turnaround specialist Jay Alix, accusing the consulting firm of concealing potential conflicts when seeking permission from bankruptcy courts to perform lucrative work on corporate restructurings.

In July 2023, former Prima Wawona CEO Dan Gerawan filed a lawsuit alleging that the investment firm Paine Schwartz used Prima Wawona, then America's largest stone fruit producer, to create financial gain for McKinsey and that many of the Paine Schwartz employees were former McKinsey employees. The lawsuit alleges that in late 2020, Paine Schwartz hired McKinsey as consultants, without board approval, to make massive changes in Prima Wawona's operations. Thereafter, the company's performance deteriorated quickly, according to the suit. Moody's downgraded the company's outlook from "stable" to "negative". In October 2023, Prima Wawona filed for bankruptcy. McKinsey was the company's largest creditor, owed $8 million. The company was in default on $679 million in debt. Efforts to sell the company in bankruptcy failed. In January 2024, the company announced that it would liquidate, lay off all 5,400 employees, and sell off more than 13,000 acres of farmland.

=== Government corruption scandals ===
==== South African corruption scandal ====
The Gupta family (no relation to former McKinsey CEO Rajat Gupta) had strategically placed corrupted individuals in various South African government, utilities and infrastructure sectors. It is alleged that McKinsey was complicit in this corruption by using the Guptas to obtain consulting contracts from certain state-owned enterprises, including Eskom and Transnet. Working with Trillian Capital Partners (a consultancy which was owned by a Gupta associate), they provided services to the value of R1 billion ($75 million) annually. Trillian was paid a commission for facilitating the business for McKinsey. McKinsey hired law firm Norton Rose Fulbright to carry out an internal investigation over the allegations. McKinsey's then Managing Partner, Dominic Barton, issued a statement following an internal investigation, in which the firm "admitted that it found violations of its professional standards but denied any acts of bribery, corruption, and payments to Trillian."

Corruption Watch, a South African non-governmental organization, filed a complaint about the controversial contract to the US Department of Justice, alleging that there was a criminal conspiracy between McKinsey, Trillian and Eskom in contravention of US and South African law. It was revealed in January 2018 that criminal complaints were filed against McKinsey & Company by the South African Companies and Intellectual Property Commission. South African prosecutors confirmed that they would enforce the seizing of assets from McKinsey.

South Africa's National Prosecuting Authority concluded in early 2018 that the payments to McKinsey and its local business partner, Trillian, were illegal, involving crimes such as fraud, theft, corruption and money laundering. McKinsey had subsequently been in discussion with Eskom and the National Prosecuting Authority's Asset Forfeiture Unit to agree on a transparent, legally appropriate process for returning the R 1 billion (US$74M) it had been paid – it was confirmed on 6 July 2018 that this had been concluded. Eskom confirmed it received R99.5M in interest from McKinsey on July 23, 2018. The interest payment covers the two years since McKinsey was paid almost R 1bn in 2016.

Information relating to allegedly corrupt practices by McKinsey at Transnet in 2011 and 2012 came to light in late July 2018. The weekly Mail & Guardian newspaper reported that a "new forensic treasury report shows how controversial former Transnet and Eskom chief financial officer Anoj Singh enjoyed overseas trips at the expense of international consulting firm McKinsey, which scored multi-billion rand contracts at the state owned entities." The "report reiterates treasury's recommendations that Singh's conduct with regards to McKinsey should be referred to the elite crime-fighting unit, the Hawks, for investigations under the Prevention and Combating of Corrupt Activities Act (Precca). Under Precca, Singh would be investigated for allegations of corruption as payment for the overseas trips alone would constitute a form of gratification, which is illegal." The Sunday City Press reported that the forensic report in turn reported that "multinational advisory firm McKinsey paid for Singh to go on lavish international trips to Dubai, Russia, Germany and the UK, after which their contract with Transnet was massively extended." McKinsey issued a statement that the allegations were incorrect. McKinsey stated that "based on an extensive review encompassing interviews, email records and expense documents, our understanding is that McKinsey did not pay for Mr. Singh's airfare and hotel lodgings in connection with the CFO Forum and the meetings that took place around the CFO Forum in London and elsewhere in 2012 and 2013." On 11 October 2019, the United States Treasury department announced that it had imposed wide-ranging financial sanctions on three Gupta brothers, Ajay, Atul and Rajesh (aka Tony) and their business associate Salim Essa under the United States Magnitsky Act.

The Economist reported in November 2019, that McKinsey's scandals, such as the 2016 South Africa scandal and the allegations of conflict of interest tied to its $12.7bn investment affiliate, McKinsey Investment Office (MIO), are relatively recent in terms of its long history. The article said that McKinsey's legal challenges facing McKinsey's new global managing partner, Kevin Sneader, may be related to the company's fast-paced growth with an increase of 2,200 partners compared to 2009. During that same time period, the number of employees increased to 30,000 worldwide from 17,000.

In 2020, McKinsey representatives giving testimony to the Zondo Commission of Inquiry into State Capture placed blame for the firm's involvement in the corruption scandal on former McKinsey partner, Vikas Sagar. During 2021 McKinsey & Co. agreed to repay R 870 million (US$63M) in fees to South African state logistics company Transnet SOC Ltd., seeking to distance itself from contracts linked to corruption allegations. In April 2022 the Zondo Commission recommended that key Eskom executives be criminally investigated for improperly awarding consulting contracts to McKinsey & Company. South Africa's National Prosecuting Authority announced on Friday, 30 September 2022 that it had criminally charged both McKinsey South Africa and former McKinsey partner, Vikas Sagar, with fraud, corruption and theft related to a contract to advise Transnet on buying new locomotives. In 2024, McKinsey was ordered to pay a $122 million criminal penalty (and enter into a three-year deferred prosecution agreement) to settle an investigation by the Justice Department and South Africa's National Prosecuting Authority for violations of the Foreign Corrupt Practices Act (FCPA); 50% of the penalty will be paid to South Africa (roughly R1.1 billion). McKinsey paid bribes to government officials in South Africa between 2012 and 2016.

==== French presidential corruption scandal ====
In December 2022, it was reported that the French National Financial Prosecutor's Office (PNF) had raided the headquarters of President Emmanuel Macron's Renaissance party and McKinsey's Paris office. The raids were related to probes into false election campaign accounting, as well as possible favouritism and conspiracy. The probe had been widened in October 2022 from an initial focus on McKinsey's taxes to include alleged underreporting of campaign consulting costs and allegations of favoritism. Even though the company had a turn over of €329 million, they did not pay any corporation taxes in France in a decade, according to the French senate. McKinsey consultants are alleged to have worked as unpaid volunteers on Macron's 2017 and 2022 election campaigns, in violation of French law. The firm is subsequently alleged to have benefitted from special access and favorable government treatment, including the awarding of lucrative government contracts. The French media has dubbed the scandal the McKinsey Affair or McKinseygate. McKinsey is facing possible charges for corruption and tax fraud as a result of the investigation. In July 2023, the case was still pending.

==== Canadian government consulting scandal ====
A January 2023 investigative report by CBC News revealed that Justin Trudeau's government had spent at least $117.4 million on McKinsey consulting since coming to power, compared to $2.2 million spent by the prior government. According to documents obtained by Radio-Canada, all of those contracts were sole-source, meaning other firms were not given the chance to bid for the contracts. Further investigative reporting identified at least $84 million in McKinsey consulting expenses between March 2021 and November 2022 alone.

According to anonymous sources with major roles at Immigration, Refugees and Citizenship Canada (IRCC), McKinsey is reported to have a particularly large and growing influence over Canadian immigration policy. Policy is reported to have been decided on without input from public servants, and with minimal consideration for the public interest. Canada's immigration targets have closely followed goals set in a plan by previous McKinsey head Dominic Barton, who outlined these plans in his 2016 report of the Advisory Council on Economic Growth and through his work with the Century Initiative. Both the report and the Century Initiative advocate for a steep increase in immigration to bring Canada's population to 100 million by 2100. According to one of the IRCC whistleblowers, the department was informed that Barton's report was a "foundational plan" in spite of reservations expressed by the then-immigration minister, John McCallum.

On January 10, 2023, Canadian opposition parties, including the Conservative Party of Canada, the New Democratic Party of Canada, and Bloc Quebecois, called for a parliamentary inquiry into federal contracts awarded to McKinsey. The opposition is demanding that the government disclose "contracts, conversations, records of work done, meetings held, text messages, email exchanges, everything that the government has with the company since taking office". McKinsey has thus far refused to answer CBC News questions regarding its role and agreements with the federal government, while the government has refused to provide copies of the company's reports. In response to the controversy, McKinsey issued a statement on its website indicating that it "welcomes the opportunity" to provide information to parliament, and that it "does not make policy recommendations on immigration or any other topic".

Trudeau asked fellow Liberal Party members Treasury Board President Mona Fortier and Procurement Minister Helena Jaczek to review the contracts return a final report. On 23 March 2023, the Treasury Board announced that audits had determined that departments did not consistently follow certain administrative rules and procedures, but that there was "broad compliance with values and ethics commitments." According to the Treasury Board, while the audits raised questions about fairness, transparency and conflicts of interest, no evidence was found of political direction in awarding the contracts.

=== Climate change ===
==== Climate action letter and AMC ====
In 2021, more than 1,100 McKinsey employees signed a letter calling out the firm for working with 43 of the 100 most polluting companies. According to The New York Times, these 43 clients alone were responsible for more than a third of the world's carbon emissions in 2018. The letter called on the firm to disclose how much carbon its clients emit. McKinsey executives said they would continue to advise major carbon polluters. Several employees resigned from the firm following the letter. In April 2022, McKinsey, Alphabet Inc., Shopify, Meta Platforms, and Stripe, Inc. announced a $925 million advance market commitment of carbon dioxide removal (CDR) from companies that are developing CDR technology over the next 9 years.

==== 2023 Africa Climate Summit ====
More than 400 civil society groups signed a letter of protest to Kenyan President William Ruto, accusing McKinsey of influencing the 2023 Africa Climate Summit. The letter claimed that the agenda for the summit, as proposed by McKinsey, "reflects the interests of the US, McKinsey and the Western corporations they represent." Leaked documents revealed that the consulting firm tried to push controversial carbon market schemes that would benefit its fossil fuel clients.

==== COP28 ====
In 2023, an AFP investigation revealed in multiple leaked documents that McKinsey was using its position as primary advisor to COP28 hosts, the United Arab Emirates, to push the interest of its oil and gas clients (ExxonMobil and Aramco). McKinsey has been accused of putting its own interests ahead of the climate by sources involved in preparatory meetings for COP28. McKinsey's energy scenario for the COP28 presidency would allow for continued investment in fossil fuels, which would undermine the goals of the Paris Agreement; an "energy transition narrative" recommends oil use to be reduced by only 50% by 2050, and that trillions of dollars should continue to be invested in high-emission assets each year to at least 2050.

=== McKinsey Partner Rachel Riley and DOGE ===
In January 2025, McKinsey consultant Rachel Riley joined the Department of Government Efficiency (DOGE), an organization headed by Elon Musk.
