= Jagdeep Singh Bachher =

Canadian manager

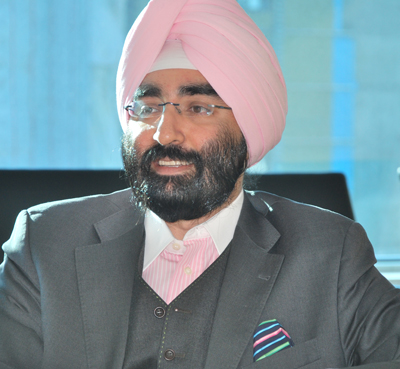

12th Chancellor of the University of Waterloo
- Incumbent
- Assumed office July 1, 2024
- Preceded by: Dominic Barton
- President/Vice Chancellor: Vivek Goel (2021-2026); Bill Rosehart (2026-present)

Chief Investment Officer of the University of California
- Incumbent
- Assumed office April 1, 2014

Personal details
- Citizenship: Canadian
- Education: University of Waterloo (BASc, MASc, PhD)
- Occupation: Manager
- Scientific career
- Fields: Management, finance
- Thesis: Venture capitalists' investment criteria in technology-based new ventures (2000)
- Doctoral advisor: Paul D. Guild

Jagdeep Singh Bachher is a Canadian manager. He currently serves as the 12th chancellor of the University of Waterloo in Canada since 2024 and as chief investment officer of the University of California since 2014. He previously served as deputy chief investment officer and chief operating officer at Alberta Investment Management Corporation from 2009 to 2014.

== Life ==
Bachher was born in Nigeria in West Africa to parents of Sikh heritage. His parents were both educators and taught, in India, Africa, and Waterloo, for more than 60 years. At the age of 15, Bachher and his family moved to Canada, where he enrolled at the University of Waterloo.

From the University of Waterloo, Bachher received a Bachelor of Applied Science in mechanical engineering in 1993, a Master of Applied Science in management sciences in 1994, and a Doctor of Philosophy in management sciences in 2000. He credited the university's co-op program with playing an important role in his life.

Bachher is now a Canadian citizen.

== Career ==
=== Alberta Investment Management Corporation ===
Bachher joined Alberta Investment Management Corporation (AIMCo) in 2009. He initially served as Deputy Chief Investment Officer and Chief Operating Officer, overseeing various portfolios and operations of AIMCo's $118 billion in assets, including public sector pension plans, provincial endowments, and government funds. His work as COO included leading AIMCo through periods of organizational change, which involved managing critical systems upgrades. Despite some challenges in management style during this period, his leadership in AIMCo's venture and innovation fund earned him recognition as a forward-thinking investor.

=== University of California ===
In January 2014, Bachher left AIMCo to serve as Chief Investment Officer and Vice President of Investments for the University of California. This office is responsible for managing the University of California's investment portfolio, which grew to over $80 billion at the time of his appointment and has since increased to $169 billion. He manages the pension, endowment, retirement savings, and working capital investment pools of the UC system, reporting directly to the Board of Regents on investment matters. During his tenure, he implemented strategic changes, including enhancing transparency and responding to stakeholder concerns, particularly around socially responsible investing.

=== University of Waterloo ===
In 2024, Bachher was appointed as the 12th Chancellor of the University of Waterloo, succeeding Dominic Barton. As a triple alumnus of the University, Bachher credits Waterloo's co-op program for significantly shaping his academic and professional career. He has served on the University's Board of Governors since 2018 and as vice-chair since 2020. In his role as Chancellor, he acts as an ambassador for the University and presides over convocation ceremonies, conferring degrees and diplomas to graduates.

=== Other Roles ===
Bachher also served as Chairman Emeritus of the Institutional Investors Roundtable, a global financial think tank. He was a visiting scholar at Stanford University's Global Projects Center, where he contributed to discussions on innovation in institutional investing.

== See also ==
- List of University of Waterloo people
