= Bill Rosehart =

Canadian electrical engineer and university administrator

8th President and Vice Chancellor of the University of Waterloo
- Incumbent
- Assumed office July 1, 2026
- Chancellor: Jagdeep Singh Bachher
- Preceded by: Vivek Goel

Personal details
- Education: University of Waterloo (BASc, MASc, PhD)

Bill Rosehart is a Canadian electrical engineer and university administrator. He is the current president and vice-chancellor of the University of Waterloo. His term as the university's eighth President and Vice-Chancellor began on 1 July 2026.

== Education ==
Rosehart received his Bachelor of Applied Science, Master of Applied Science, and Doctor of Philosophy in electrical engineering from the University of Waterloo.

== Career ==
Rosehart joined the University of Calgary in 2001 as a faculty member in electrical engineering. He was appointed to succeed Guy Gendron head as of the Department of Electrical and Computer Engineering and as dean of the Schulich School of Engineering on July 1 2013.

On 1 August 2024, he was appointed provost and vice president for academics at the University of Guelph; he was succeeded by Byron Sheldrick.

In March 2026, the University of Waterloo announced that Rosehart would become its next President and Vice-Chancellor, effective 1 July 2026. He will be the first Waterloo alum to serve as the university's president.

== Research ==
Rosehart's research has focused on the planning and operation of sustainable energy systems.

== Honours ==
Rosehart received the APEGA Centennial Leadership Award in 2024. He was named a Fellow of the Engineering Institute of Canada in 2023 and is also a Fellow of the Canadian Academy of Engineering.

== See also ==
- List of University of Waterloo people
