= Dominic Barton =

Canadian business executive and diplomat

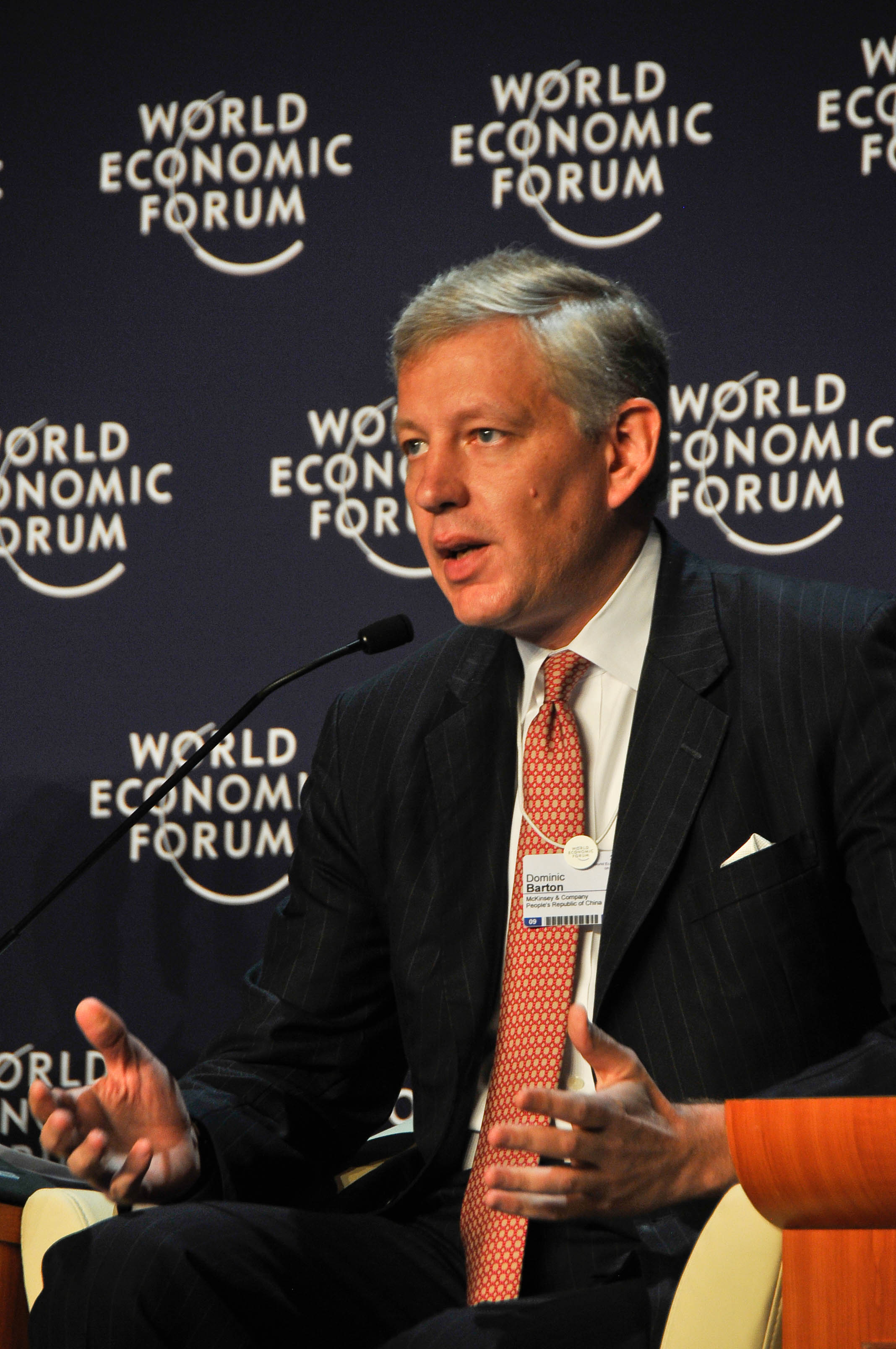
- Barton in 2009

11th Chancellor of the University of Waterloo
- In office 1 January 2018 – 30 June 2024
- Preceded by: Tom Jenkins
- Succeeded by: Jagdeep Singh Bachher
- President/Vice Chancellor: Feridun Hamdullahpur (2018-2021); Vivek Goel (2021-2024)

21st Canadian Ambassador to China
- In office 5 September 2019 – 31 December 2021
- Prime Minister: Justin Trudeau
- Preceded by: John McCallum
- Succeeded by: Jennifer May

Personal details
- Born: 14 September 1962 (age 64) Kampala, Uganda
- Education: University of British Columbia (BA); Brasenose College, Oxford (MPhil)
- Occupation: Chairman, university chancellor

Dominic Stephen Barton (born 14 September 1962), known as Bao Damin (Chinese: 鲍达民) in China, is a Canadian business executive, author, and former diplomat. Based in London, he is chairman of Rio Tinto, one of the largest metals and mining companies in the world, and chairman of LeapFrog Investments, a private investment firm that invests in high-growth, emerging markets, with a focus on social and environmental impact. He chairs Invest in Canada, a federal agency responsible for attracting foreign investment.

Barton served as the Canadian Ambassador to the People's Republic of China from 2019 to 2021, and was the Chancellor of the University of Waterloo from 2018 to 2024. Prior to this, Barton spent more than three decades at McKinsey & Company, including nine years as the firm's global managing partner from 2009 to 2018. He is a co-founder of FCLT Global, a non-profit promoting long-term investment.He previously served as chair of the International Integrated Reporting Council (IIRC).

== Early life and education ==
Dominic Barton was born in Mukono, Uganda in 1962. Barton's father was an Anglican missionary who helped develop a theology college in Uganda; his mother was a nurse. During his childhood, his family's house was occupied by general and future dictator Idi Amin, who was rising to power in Uganda at the time. At age seven his family moved from Uganda to Canada, eventually settling in the community of Sardis, British Columbia.

Barton attended the University of British Columbia, where he earned a Bachelor's degree in economics. He was awarded a Rhodes Scholarship and attended Brasenose College at Oxford University, where he received an MPhil degree in economics.

== Career ==
After graduating, Barton worked briefly as a currency analyst for N M Rothschild & Sons in London.

=== McKinsey ===
In 1986, he was hired by McKinsey & Company to work in the company's Toronto office and worked from that office as a management consultant for eleven years.

Barton was elected to the position of Global Managing Director, a role that he served in from 2009 to 2018. After this role, Barton became Global Managing Director Emeritus for a year while accepting a broader range of philanthropic and advisory positions. From 2018 to 2019 he was chairman of natural resources giant Teck, one of the largest exporters of steel-making coal in the world. One employee resigned from McKinsey because of the increased work McKinsey did with Teck in that year, including projects titled "Coal Processing Optimization" and "Drill and Blast. On 5 September 2019, he was appointed as the Canadian Ambassador to the People's Republic of China.

==== Work in Asia ====
In 1997 Barton moved to the McKinsey office in Seoul, where he eventually led McKinsey's national practice. During Barton's tenure in South Korea, McKinsey worked with the South Korean government to restructure the country's financial system aiming to foster a 'creative economy'.

Barton with Indian Prime Minister Narendra Modi in New Delhi, India in 2016

He was Chairman for McKinsey in Asia from 2004 to 2009, operating out of Shanghai. He co-authored a book that provided insights into ordinary Chinese citizens and their way of life, China Vignettes – An Inside Look At China.

He has been an adjunct professor at Beijing's Tsinghua University and served on the School of Economics and Management's advisory board. Barton also chaired the Seoul International Business Advisory Council for six years and was a member of the Singapore Economic Development Board's International Advisory Council for ten years.

==== Managing Director ====
In July 2009, he was elected to the position of Global Managing Director of McKinsey & Company, based on a vote of 400 senior partners. He was re-elected to a second three-year term in 2012 and a third term in 2015, serving the maximum three terms at the head of the global firm. He was replaced by Kevin Sneader in 2018.

McKinsey was ranked as the number one consulting firm in the world for nine consecutive years during Barton's leadership. In 2013 and 2016 Glassdoor ranked Barton as one of the top CEOs globally, based on employee choice.

During Barton's time as Global Managing Director of McKinsey & Co between 2009 and 2018, the firm was embroiled in several scandals, e.g. - South Africa, Valeant, Insider trading by its investment affiliate, and association with several authoritarian regimes around the world. Since leaving McKinsey & Co, the firm has faced scrutiny over work McKinsey did for Purdue Pharma to improve its opioid sales, which contributed to the opioid epidemic.

=== Advisory Council on Public Service ===
Barton served on the Canadian Advisory Committee on the Public Service under former Prime Minister Stephen Harper. Barton was one of several Canadian business leaders that advised the Prime Minister on the renewal and development of the country's public service.

=== Advisory Council on Economic Growth ===
Barton served as chair of the Advisory Council on Economic Growth, the Canadian federal government's blue-chip panel, starting in 2017. The council outlined 13 recommendations, including the creation of the Canada Infrastructure Bank, the launch of a re-skilling program for the Canadian workforce, the formulation of growth strategies for sectors with untapped potential, including agriculture, and the development of the Invest in Canada hub.

The Council set a goal of lifting "the median household's income to $105,000 in 2030". It was about $80,000 in 2017. The Council also called for a gradual increase in permanent immigration to Canada to 450,000 people a year.

=== Academia ===
On 19 June 2018, Barton was named the 11th chancellor of the University of Waterloo. Barton was reappointed as chancellor on 25 February 2021.

Previously he has served as a co-chair on the Max Bell School of Public Policy Advisory Board at McGill University and on the cabinet of the University of Toronto Psychiatry Campaign.

=== Ambassador of Canada to China ===
On 4 September 2019, Barton was appointed to be ambassador to China by the Government of Canada. The appointment was met with a mixed reaction, including scrutiny around Barton's past ties with China while proponents of the appointment argued that Barton's Asian and Chinese experience made him a uniquely qualified selection.

After taking on the role, Barton led Canada's efforts to win the release of Michael Kovrig and Michael Spavor, two Canadians who were imprisoned in China in December, 2018, in a move widely seen as retaliation for the arrest of Huawei executive Meng Wanzhou. Throughout their detention, Barton conducted regular consular visits with Kovrig and Spavor, often delivering coded messages to avoid interception from eavesdropping prison guards.

The Toronto Star also reported that Barton's work on this file pre-dated his appointment as Ambassador, as his network and understanding of the relevant stakeholders helped pave the way for open communication channels between Chinese, Canadian, and U.S. officials. All three countries had "red lines" and Barton played a leading role finding a "pathway" that would ultimately lead to their release.

In April 2021, this included meetings in Washington where Barton received a commitment from senior U.S. officials to put intensity into their pressure on Beijing. The Wall Street Journal also reported that Barton maintained a line of communications with Xie Feng, China's Vice Foreign Minister, to coordinate the logistics of an eventual resolution that would bring the prisoner standoff to an end.

On 24 September 2021, Kovrig and Spavor were released from detention in China and boarded a plane with Barton to Anchorage, Calgary, and Toronto. It was reported by Canadian media that this flight followed weeks of consecutive meetings held with Barton and Chinese officials as part of a "highly choreographed" effort. Barton was personally thanked by then-Prime Minister Justin Trudeau for his role in securing the release of the two men.

On 6 December 2021, it was announced that Barton would step down from the role after completing the "core mission" that he had been appointed to achieve: securing the release of Kovrig and Spavor.

=== Rio Tinto ===
In April 2022, Barton was recruited to join the board of Rio Tinto in the wake of the destruction of the Juukan Gorge rock shelters in 2020 and the related crisis of values and culture, becoming chairman on 5 May 2022. As chairman, he has overseen efforts to rebuild the company's social licence, reform its culture, and improve operational and financial performance, with the share price reaching new highs. He has positioned Rio Tinto as a partner to governments and customers in the energy transition, emphasizing the role of mining and materials industries in supplying the inputs required for industrial growth and the energy transition.

Under Barton's chairmanship, Rio Tinto has made multibillion-dollar capital investments in Canada, Australia, the United States, Guinea and Argentina.

=== Writing ===
He is the author and co-author of four books and more than 80 articles on business leadership and the role of business in society. Barton authored China Vignettes: An Inside Look At China and co-authored Dangerous Markets: Managing in Financial Crises and Talent Wins: The New Playbook for Putting People First.

=== Board and advisory positions ===
Barton has been a member of multiple boards like the Singapore Economic Development Board's International Advisory Council and worked as an advisor to the Asian Development Bank. Barton also sits on the steering committee of the China–United States Exchange Foundation.

In April 2022, Barton joined the board of Rio Tinto, and in May, he became chairman. Thst same month, he was appointed Chairman of the Management Board of Leapfrog Investments, a private investment firm that invests in high-growth, emerging markets, with a focus on social and environmental impact.

In October 2022, the Eurasia Group, a global political risk consultancy, announced that Barton was joining the firm as a Strategic Counselor. Eurasia Group cited Barton's extensive business and diplomatic acumen as reasons for the appointment.

=== Century Initiative ===
Barton co-founded Century Initiative, described as "a diverse, non-partisan network of Canadians” dedicated to advocating for policies and programs aimed at increasing Canada's population to 100 million by 2100. In addition to immigration, this work focuses on urban development and infrastructure, early childhood supports, employment and entrepreneurship, and education. Barton is no longer involved with the project.

== Honours, awards, and philanthropy ==
=== Awards ===
- 2011 – INSEAD Business Leader for the World Award
- 2013 – Order of Civil Merit (Peony Award), South Korea
- 2014 – Academy of International Business International Executive of the Year Award
- 2014 – Public Service Star, Singapore
- 2017 – Foreign Policy Association Corporate Social Responsibility Award
- 2017 – Public Policy Forum Testimonial Award, Canada

=== Honorary Degrees ===
- 2010 – Honorary Fellow, Brasenose College, University of Oxford
- 2012 – Honorary Doctor of Laws (LL.D.), University of British Columbia
- 2012 – Honorary Doctor of Laws (LL.D.), York University
- 2014 – Honorary Doctor of Laws (LL.D.), Western University
- 2014-15 – Honorary Doctor of Science in Social Science, University of Edinburgh
- 2015 – Honorary Doctorate, Amity University, India
- 2016 – Honorary Doctor of Technology, British Columbia Institute of Technology
- 2018 – Honorary Doctor of Commerce (D.Com.), Saint Mary's University
- 2018 – Honorary Doctor of Laws (LL.D.), University of Toronto

=== Philanthropy ===
Barton has served on the board of the Malala Fund, a global organization dedicated to helping young girls in the developing world gain access to education founded by Pakistani human rights activist Malala Yousafzai.

Barton was also involved in the United Nations HeForShe initiative, a campaign focused on advancing global gender equality.

Barton is a member of the Rhodes Trust Founder's Circle and was a trustee of the Brookings Institution.He has also sat on the board of the University of Oxford Saïd Business School.

He was a Commissioner for the Global Commission on Internet Governance. He was a member of the International Advisory Board at the University of Oxford Blavatnik School of Government and of the Board of Trustees of Saudi Arabia's King Abdullah University of Science and Technology.

He additionally serves as Co-Conference Host at the St. Gallen Symposium together with Lord Brian Griffiths and Roshni Nadar.

Barton currently serves as the International Advisory Board Member of the Global Finance & Technology Network.

== Personal life ==
Barton, whose principal residence is in Beijing, was married to Canadian-born glass artist and scion of the Canadian beer family and former securities lawyer, Sheila Labatt. He has two children from this marriage. He divorced in 2014, later marrying Geraldine Buckingham, an Australian who was formerly Blackrock's Asia Pacific Chairman. Barton and Buckingham have two children together.

== Bibliography ==
- Barton, Dominic; Newell, Roberto; Wilson, Gregory (2 October 2002). Dangerous Markets: Managing in Financial Crises. John Wiley & Sons. ISBN 978-0-471-42973-9.
- Barton, Dominic (2007). China Vignettes. Talisman Publishers. ISBN 978-981-05-8091-9.

== See also ==
- List of University of Waterloo people
- Century Initiative

Business positions
Preceded by Ian Davis	Managing director of McKinsey & Company, Inc. 2009– 2018	Succeeded by Kevin Sneader
