= Bruce Henderson =

American businessman and consultant

- Born: Bruce Doolin Henderson; April 30, 1915; Nashville, Tennessee, U.S.
- Died: July 20, 1992 (aged 77); Nashville, Tennessee, U.S.
- Education: Vanderbilt University (BS); Harvard University (incomplete)
- Known for: Founder of Boston Consulting Group
- Spouse(s): Frances Henderson; Bess Henderson
- Children: 4

Bruce Doolin Henderson (April 30, 1915 – July 20, 1992) was an American businessman and management expert. He founded Boston Consulting Group (BCG) in 1963 in Boston, Massachusetts and headed the firm as the president and CEO until 1980. He continued as chairman of BCG until 1985.

== Early life ==
Henderson in his "red PDS sweater", ca 1930

Henderson was born on a farm in Nashville, Tennessee on April 30, 1915. In the fourth grade, he enrolled in the Peabody Demonstration School (PDS) and remained there until his high school graduation in 1932.

During high school, Henderson played on the football team.

== Personal life ==
Henderson married twice. With his first wife, Frances, he fathered four children. He had two daughters—Asta Werme and Ceacy Griffin—and two sons—Bruce Alexander Henderson and Bruce Balfour Henderson. His second wife was Bess, with whom he had no children. Henderson had seven grandchildren at the time of his death.

== Career ==
Henderson began his career as a salesman in the Southwestern Advantage entrepreneurial program. He went on to attend and earn an undergraduate degree in mechanical engineering from Vanderbilt University in 1937, before attending Harvard Business School. He left Harvard only ninety days before graduation to work for the Westinghouse Corporation. Henderson worked there for 18 years. He became the vice president at the age of 37, making him one of the youngest vice presidents in the company's history.

In 1959, Henderson left the company to join the consulting firm Arthur D. Little as a senior vice president for management services. He left the firm in 1963 over disagreements with the firm's leadership.

== Boston Consulting Group ==
Upon leaving Arthur D. Little, Henderson accepted a challenge from the CEO of Boston Company to create a consulting arm for the bank, operating as a subsidiary under the name Management and Consulting Division of the Boston Safe Deposit and Trust Company. This consulting arm began its operations in 1963. Initially, it advised clients of the bank. Billings for the first month were only US$500. Nevertheless, Henderson hired his second consultant, Arthur P. Contas, in December 1963.

Henderson provided a very specific imprint to the firm, that of strategy consultants. Robert Mainer gave an account of how that choice was made:

[Henderson] asked what we thought [BCG's] specialty should be. Many suggestions were offered, but in each case, we were able to identify several other firms that already had strong credentials in that particular area. The discussion began to stall. Then Bruce asked a momentous question: 'What about business strategy?' I objected: 'That's too vague. Most executives won't know what we're talking about.' Bruce replied, 'That's the beauty of it. We'll define it'.—Robert E. Mainer, Boston 1964-1967

Bruce created the publication entitled Perspectives as a new form of marketing and in response to the McKinsey Quarterly and Arthur D. Little's Prism. He wrote extensively for the publication until 1980.

In 1974 Henderson made BCG an independent business and was one of the first to take advantage of the Employee Retirement Income Security Act of 1974 that allowed the establishment of an employee stock ownership plan (ESOP). The ESOP began the process of buying BCG from The Boston Company, the parent corporation of Boston Safe Deposit. The buyout was completed in 1979, five years ahead of schedule.

Between 1974 and 1980, Henderson focused on growing the firm and expanding its international presence. By the end of 1977, revenues were split evenly among business originating in the United States and overseas.

== Retirement ==
Henderson stepped down from his role as the president and CEO of Boston Consulting Group in 1980. He was succeeded by Alan Zakon. By that time, he had grown BCG from a one-man-shop to a global firm with seven offices and 249 consultants. He continued as the chairman until 1985. He retired and went to Nashville, Tennessee, to teach at the Owen Graduate School of Management at Vanderbilt University.

== Death ==
Henderson died at the age of 77, ten days after suffering a stroke at his home in Nashville in 1992. He was survived by his second wife, four children with his first wife, and seven grandchildren.

A memorial service was held with an overflow of attendees at the Memorial Church at Harvard Yard, Cambridge, on December 11, 1992, amidst a blizzard. Speakers at the service included John S. Clarkson, then-president and chief executive officer of BCG, George Stalk, a senior vice president of BCG, and Alan Zakon, former BCG chairman.

== Ideas and concepts ==
=== The experience curve ===
"The strategic implications of the experience curve came closer to shattering earth."—The Economist, 2009

The Experience Curve is a managerial tool primarily used to predict cost behaviour. It states that "costs characteristically decline by 20-30% in real terms each time accumulated experience doubles. This means that when inflation is factored out, costs should always decline. The decline is fast if growth is fast and slow if growth is slow."

The Experience Curve partially relies upon the concept of the learning curve, yet expands upon it in de-linking it from labor-driven repetitive tasks.

As a managerial tool, the experience curve is still in use in the 2010s; for example, by Petrobras in oil field development.

=== The growth-share matrix ===
The growth-share matrix—or BCG Matrix, as it came to be known—is a managerial tool used to visually represent a company's portfolio. It is a two-by-two matrix, which divides the dimensions of relative market share (x-axis) and market growth (y-axis) into four quadrants. Individual business are represented with circles having an area proportional to the size of the business itself.

The growth-share matrix evolved as a collaborative effort of BCG employees in the period between 1968 and 1970. The theory underpinning it was laid out in the BCG perspective The Product Portfolio in 1970.

One unusual characteristic of this visualization is that the x-axis is generally represented on an inverted scale (greater values are on the left), and on a logarithmic scale. The logarithmic scale may have been carried over from the work done on the Experience Curve (which uses a log-log scale), and is not always consistently used as such. In many cases, the scale used is linear, not logarithmic. According to Aldershof, the inverted scale is merely accidental. During an early development session, Dr. Zakon sketched the two-by-two matrix on a chalkboard, and labeled the sections as High and Low from top to bottom, and High and Low from left to right, simply for convenience. The format persisted through later development sessions, without anyone considering that in the future the axis might become calibrated— where a low-to-high scale from left to right would be more typical and easier to produce.

=== Brinkmanship in business ===
"The goal of the hottest economic war, is an agreement for coexistence, not annihilation."—Bruce D. Henderson, 1976.

Henderson said the article could equally be titled "How to Succeed in Business by Being Unreasonable". He wrote that to compete effectively, it was necessary to appear to be co-operating while in fact ensuring to get one's own way. He compared business to international relations during peacetime, when countries compete ferociously but exercise restraint to avoid war.

=== Business and biology ===
"Competition existed long before strategy. It began with life itself."—Bruce D. Henderson, 1989

By the early 1980s, the lessons of the experience curve led Henderson to shift his thinking beyond the bankruptcy of mainstream economics. He began to imagine a new and far more powerful kind of economics. The realization that organizations are not static machines but complex, dynamic systems that learn from experience led him to begin seeing companies as living, growing organisms. Following this logic, Henderson began to argue that the competition in the economy's market niches was remarkably like competition in nature's ecologic niches.

The article "The Origin of Strategy" (1989) in this area was the last article he published.

== Personality and style ==
=== Favorite quotes ===
An engineer by training, Henderson never tired of quoting Archimedes to aspiring staff: "Give me a lever and a place to stand, and I will move the world".—Carl W. Stern, 2006

He was fond of quoting Jay Forrester: "While most people understand first-order effects, few deal well with second-and third-order effects. Unfortunately, virtually everything interesting in business lies in fourth-order effects and beyond"—Carl W. Stern, 2006

== Awards and recognition ==
In 1953, President Dwight D. Eisenhower appointed Henderson to a team of five analysts who evaluated foreign aid programs in Germany under the Marshall Plan.

Henderson was named one of Time magazine's top 10 newsmakers under 30 years old.

In 1978 Henderson was inducted by Vanderbilt's School of Engineering as a Distinguished Alumnus.

Henderson received the Distinguished Alumnus Award in 1985 by the University School of Nashville, from which he had graduated in 1932.

Upon his death, the Financial Times stated that Henderson "did more to change the way business is done in the United States than any other man in American business history".

The Bruce D. Henderson Chair in Strategy was endowed by Bruce's wife Bess after his death at the Owen Graduate School of Management of Vanderbilt University.

The Boston Consulting Group Bruce D. Henderson Chair in International Management was endowed by BCG in 1995 at INSEAD. It is currently held by W. Chan Kim.

The Bruce D. Henderson Scholarship was endowed in 1985 by the Boston Consulting Group to honor Henderson and awarded to the MBA student at the Owen School of Management of Vanderbilt University, who, during the first year, achieved the strongest record in personal, professional, and academic performance.

The Boston Consulting Group launched the BCG Henderson Institute in honor of Henderson on his hundredth birthday. In January 2018, the BCG Henderson Institute was ranked the third Best For Profit Global Think Tank by the University of Pennsylvania. The institute operates hubs in Europe and Asia and is headquartered in New York.

== Publications ==
Books:

- Henderson on Corporate Strategy. 1979. Harper Collins. ISBN 978-0-89011-526-8.
- Logic of Business Strategy. 1984. Harper Collins. ISBN 978-0-88410-983-9.

Monographs:

- Perspectives
- Perspectives on Experience. 1972. The Boston Consulting Group. ISBN 978-0-78370-000-7
- The Boston Consulting Group on Strategy: Classic Concepts and New Perspectives (2nd edition). 2006. Wiley. ISBN 978-0-47175-722-1

== References and sources ==
Notes

Sources

- "The Lords Of Strategy: the secret intellectual history of the new corporate world". 2010. Harvard Business School Publishing. ISBN 978-1-59139-782-3.
- Emmons, Garry, ed. (March 2010). "Lords of Strategy: Inventing Business's Great Game". Alumni Bulletin. Harvard Business School.
- "International Directory of Company Histories", Volume 58, St. James Press, December 2003, ISBN 978-1-55862-503-7
