= Kevin Sneader =

Canadian and British management consultant

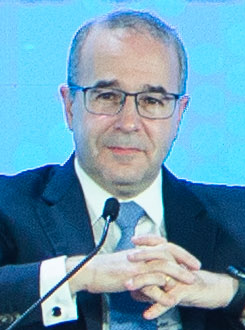
- Born: May 5, 1966 (age 59); Canada
- Education: University of Glasgow (LLB); Harvard University (MBA)
- Occupation: Management consultant
- Employer: McKinsey & Company
- Title: Senior Partner and Global Managing Director
- Term: July 2018 – July 2021
- Predecessor: Dominic Barton
- Successor: Bob Sternfels
- Spouse: Amy Muntner
- Children: 2
- Parent(s): Walter Sneader; Myrna Sneader

Kevin Sneader (born c. 1966) is a Canadian and British management consultant. He was McKinsey & Company's global managing partner from July 2018 to July 2021. He failed to secure a second term in that position in early 2021, becoming the first global managing partner since 1976 not to win such an election. He was hired by Goldman Sachs as co-president for the Asia-Pacific region in September 2021.

== Early life and education ==
Kevin Sneader was born 1966 in Canada and grew up in Glasgow, Scotland. His father, Walter Sneader, was a chemistry professor at the University of Strathclyde; his mother, Myrna, was a teacher in a Jewish nursery school. He is Jewish.

Sneader attended Hutchesons' Grammar School in Glasgow and went on to graduate from the University of Glasgow, where he earned a Bachelor of Laws. He earned a Master of Business Administration from Harvard Business School, where he was a Baker Scholar.

== Career ==
Sneader joined McKinsey and Company upon graduating from the University of Glasgow. He was the managing partner of McKinsey's UK and Ireland division until 2014, when he became the chairman of its Asia-Pacific division. In February 2018, he was appointed as McKinsey's global managing partner to succeed Dominic Barton in July. Kevin Sneader was McKinsey’s first Scottish, and its first Jewish, leader.

== Personal life ==
Sneader is married to Amy Muntner. Sneader lives in Hong Kong with his wife, Amy, and their two daughters.

== Controversy ==
In 2019, McKinsey & Company received criticism for its role as consultant to the U.S. Immigration and Customs Enforcement agency. In a 2019 email to the firm, Sneader indicated that McKinsey had never focused on developing, advising or implementing immigration policies. McKinsey, he wrote, “will not, under any circumstances, engage in work, anywhere in the world, that advances or assists policies that are at odds with our values.” A subsequent New York Times investigation claimed that McKinsey's involvement in deportations had been more extensive than Sneader acknowledged in his email.

Sneader was also in charge in McKinsey during controversies around their work with Saudi Arabia and Russia, the former after the murder of journalist Jamal Khashoggi. Similarly damaging were revelations of their work with Purdue Pharma while also working for the FDA during the opioid crisis. McKinsey paid $619m to settle claims brought by 50 US states, five territories and the District of Columbia over its opioid work.

The settlements come after lawsuits unearthed a trove of documents showing how McKinsey worked to drive sales of Purdue Pharma’s OxyContin painkiller amid an opioid crisis in the United States that has contributed to the deaths of more than 450,000 people over the past two decades.

Business positions
Preceded by Dominic Barton	Managing director of McKinsey & Company, Inc. 2018 – 2021	Succeeded by Bob Sternfels
