= Vivek Goel =

Indo-Canadian physician, public health expert and university administrator

Vivek Goel CM OOnt
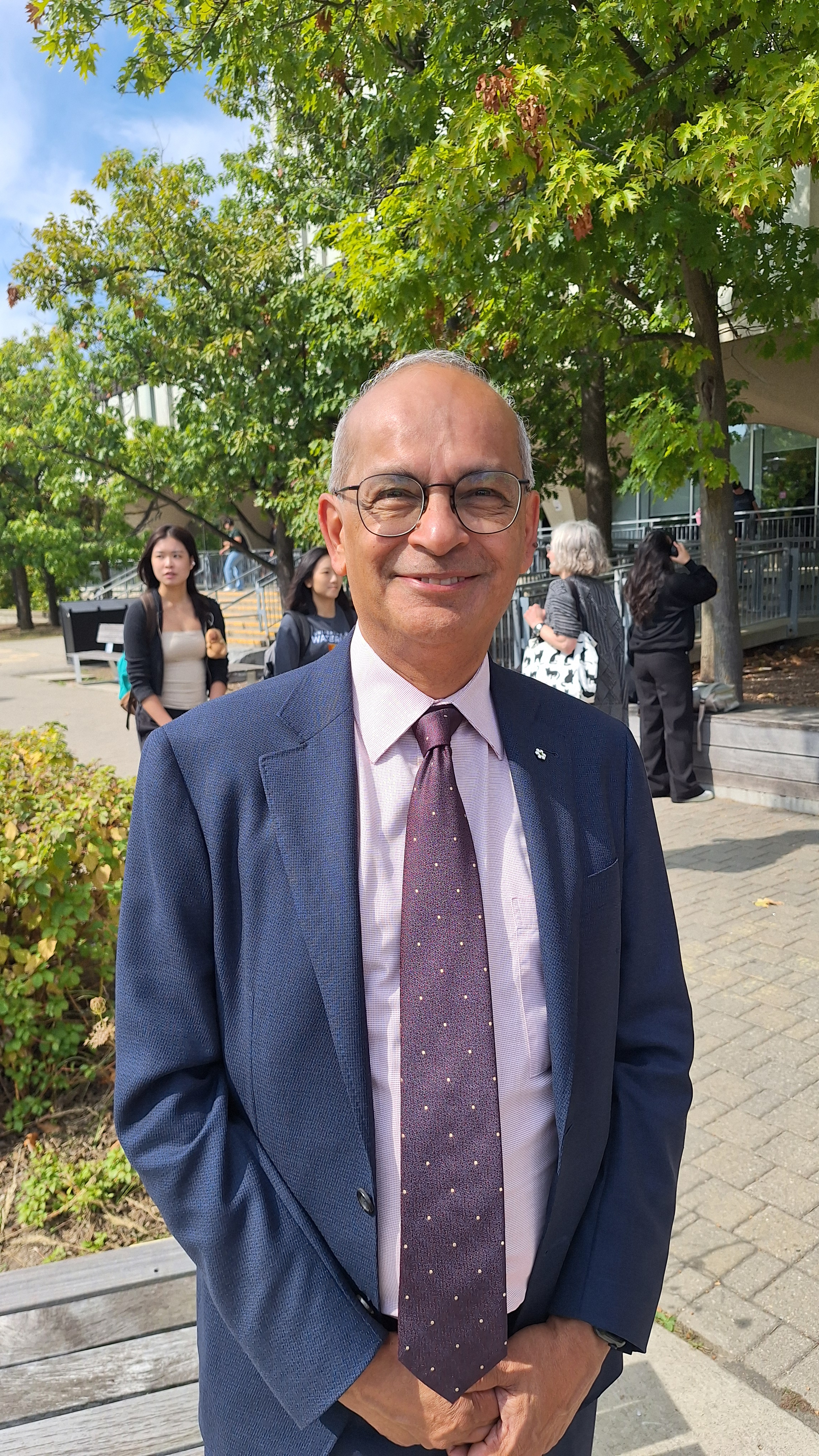
- Goel in 2024

7th President and Vice-Chancellor of the University of Waterloo
- In office July 1, 2021 – June 30, 2026
- Chancellor: Dominic Barton; Jagdeep Singh Bachher
- Preceded by: Feridun Hamdullahpur
- Succeeded by: Bill Rosehart

Vice-President, Research & Innovation, and Strategic Initiatives of the University of Toronto
- In office 2015 – 2020
- President: Meric Gertler

President of the University of Toronto
- Acting; July 1, 2005 – September 30, 2005
- Chancellor: Vivienne Poy
- Preceded by: Frank Iacobucci (interim)
- Succeeded by: David Naylor

10th Vice-President and Provost of the University of Toronto
- In office 2004 – 2008
- President: Frank Iacobucci (interim); David Naylor
- Preceded by: Shirley Neuman
- Succeeded by: Cheryl Misak

Personal details
- Education: McGill University (MD); University of Toronto (MSc); Harvard University (MS)
- Awards: Order of Canada (member)
- Scientific career
- Workplaces: University of Toronto; Public Health Ontario

Vivek Goel CM OOnt is a Canadian physician and health researcher who served as the seventh president and vice-chancellor of the University of Waterloo from 2021 to 2026. He is Professor Emeritus in the Dalla Lana School of Public Health at the University of Toronto, where he served as its 10th vice-president and provost from 2004 to 2008. He is recognized in Canada and internationally as a public health researcher and expert in health-services evaluation. He has been an advocate for the use of research evidence in health policy-making.

== Education ==
Goel obtained his medical degree from McGill University. He then completed post-graduate medical training in Community Medicine at the University of Toronto. Goel went on to do a Master of Science (MSc) in Community Health from the University of Toronto and a Master of Science (MS) in Biostatistics from the Harvard T.H. Chan School of Public Health.

== Career ==
Goel began his career as an assistant professor with the University of Toronto's Department of Preventive Medicine and Biostatistics, and was later named the chair of the Department of Health Administration. From 1999 to 2001, he served as the vice-provost of the Faculty of Medicine, before becoming the vice-president and provost of the university from 2004 to 2008. He served as acting president of the University of Toronto in the time until David Naylor entered office as its fifteenth president. Goel left the University of Toronto, in 2008, to serve as the first president and CEO of Public Health Ontario until 2014. Goel returned to the university in 2015 to serve as its Vice-President of Research and Innovation, and Strategic Initiatives, holding the office until 2020. In June 2020, Goel stepped down from his position at the University of Toronto in order to support the Canadian government's COVID-19 Immunity Task Force and the CanCOVID Research Network, national research platform for COVID-19 research. He was also the Chief Academic Strategist of Coursera.

Goel serves on numerous boards and committees including the Canadian Institute for Health Information, Grand River Hospital, and the Business + Higher Education Roundtable. He also serves on the board of the Vector Institute, Canada Health Labs (Vice-Chair), the Canadian Institute for Health Information (Vice-Chair) and the POST Promise. He is a Fellow of the Canadian Academy of Health Sciences and a fellow of the Fields Institute for Research in Mathematical Sciences. He is a Member of the Order of Canada. On 2 December 2020, Goel was appointed as a Member of the "Order of Canada" for his contributions as an academic and administrator who is committed to the advancement of public health services, evidence-based health care and research innovation.

It was announced in November 2020 that Goel would be the seventh President and Vice-Chancellor of the University of Waterloo. He was officially installed on November 8, 2021. In 2023, he was recognized for his contributions to the Canadian health system through the Canadian Health Leadership Network’s McNaught-Taillon Leadership Award.

Goel is set to conclude his tenure as President and Vice-Chancellor of the University of Waterloo in June 2026.

== Honours ==
Ribbon	Description	Notes
	Member of the Order of Canada (C.M.)	Awarded on 2 December 2020.; Invested on 2 May 2024.
	Member of the Order of Ontario (O.Ont.)	2024

== See also ==
- List of University of Waterloo people
