= Bob Sternfels =

American business executive

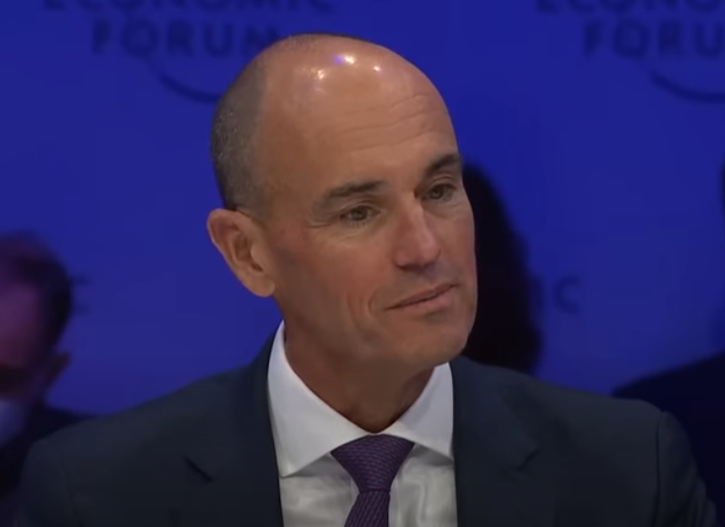
- Sternfels at the 2023 World Economic Forum
- Born: Lodi, California, U.S.
- Education: Stanford University (BA); Worcester College, Oxford (MA)
- Occupation: Businessman

Robert Sternfels is an American business executive who has been the global managing partner of McKinsey & Company since July 2021.

== Early life and education ==
After growing up in Lodi, California, in San Joaquin County, Sternfels studied history and economics at Stanford University, where he was a member of the NCAA Division I varsity water polo team. He went on to further study at Worcester College, Oxford, as a Rhodes Scholar. While originally intending to read international law, he ended up studying towards a Master's degree in philosophy, politics and economics.

== Career ==
Sternfels joined McKinsey upon graduating from Oxford University in 1994. At the time of his election to managing partner in 2021, he led the firm's advanced analytics practice and was based in the San Francisco office. He had previously led McKinsey's operations practice in the US and its private equity practice globally.

He is a board member of QuestBridge, sits on the advisory board of USA Water Polo and is a trustee of the Rhodes Trust. He has also served as the treasurer of The American Oxonian.

In November 2025, Sternfels was elected to a five year term on the Stanford University Board of Trustees.

Business positions
Preceded by Kevin Sneader	Managing director of McKinsey & Company, Inc. since 2021	Succeeded by incumbent
