= Target school =

Concept in graduate recruitment

Target school or target university is a term used in banking and finance, consulting, and law firms that refers to a university from which those firms and institutions actively recruit new talent. These universities are often prestigious and send significant numbers of their graduates into those firms each year and have broad alumni networks in the industry. A school is also often considered a target when a large number of City or Wall Street firms conduct an on-campus recruiting ("OCR"). A school's status as a target may vary slightly from industry to industry, firm to firm, and region to region, but in general is divided into target, semi-target, and non-target schools.

== Overview ==
Most universities in the Russell Group and Ivy League are target schools

Russell Group in the United Kingdom

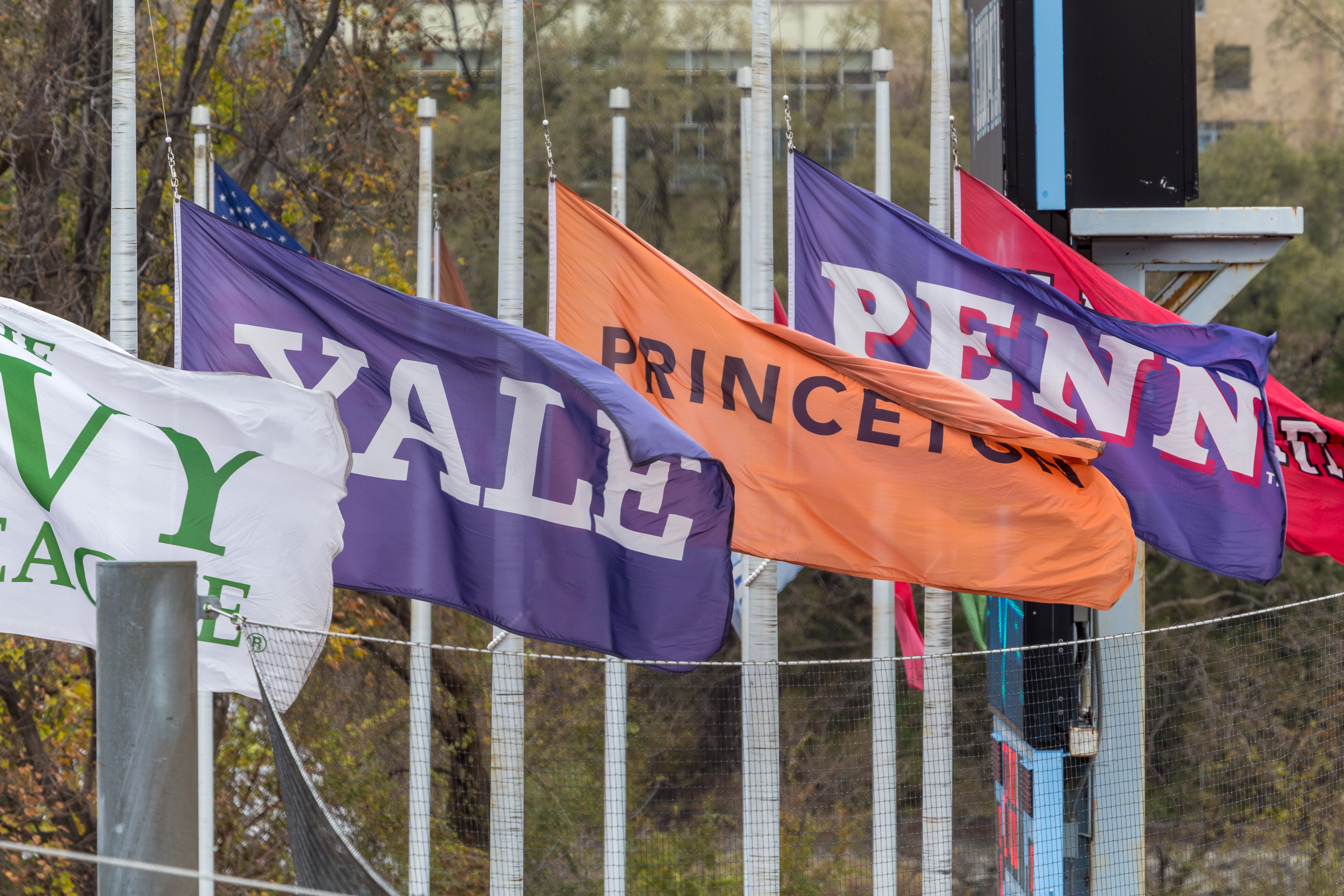
Ivy League in the United States

Credential elitism within the graduate job market has been researched extensively and there is a general consensus in the industry that firms typically identify between ten and twenty "target" schools from which they will accept applications, most commonly compose their "list" of "targets" and "semi-targets" based on university's prestige. In doing so, HR officials and partners in charge of recruitment typically drew from shared cultural understandings about the quality and selectivity of particular institutions. This was further supported by Karen Ho that firms' focus on recruiting the "best and brightest" is less about technical skills, finance backgrounds, or specific banking abilities. Instead, recruiters prioritise selecting graduates from elite schools that align with the desired cultural capital and prestige. The decision-making process for assigning graduates to high-profile roles in the front office of large financial institutions is partly influenced by whether the candidate holds a degree from a prestigious institution and ultimately serves as an indicator of whether the candidate fits the company's cultural uniformity. Ho also noted that investment banks establish a self-reinforcing connection between the Ivy League and the market, asserting that because they employ the most talented and capable individuals, their perspectives on the market should be trusted and the deals they propose should be executed.

It is worth noting that Wall Street and City firms often accept resumes from students at schools outside their designated "target" list, though these applications are typically placed in a "separate stream" and not given the same level of consideration as those from target schools. In many firms, applicants from non-target institutions are usually overlooked unless they have an internal reference or if the pool of target candidates has been exhausted, and sometimes out of empathy from HR. However, Rivera also highlights that these selection processes were applied even to students from universities commonly regarded as "elite" by labour market experts and university rankings, if those schools were not included on a particular firm's recruitment list.

"You will find it when you go to like career fairs or something and you know someone will show up and say, you know, “Hey, I didn’t go to HBS (Harvard Business School) but, you know, I am an engineer at MIT and I heard about this fair, and I wanted to come and meet you in New York City." God bless him for the effort but, you know, it's just not going to work. I mean you never know, but from our experience we just don't have the resources. We don't give that person as much of a chance because we all have day jobs."

— as cited in Lauren A. Rivera,

Students are noted to be well-aware of this phenomenon. In 1996, Pierre Bourdieu observed that students' emphasis on seeking both interesting careers and the social status that comes with them provides insight into how they view education. This focus on meaningful work and prestige helps explain why students often perceive elite career opportunities, sometimes called "blue chip" prospects, as desirable. As a result, many students come to understand that studying at a prestigious university can offer a significant competitive advantage in the job market. This has thus created an awareness among students that studying at an elite university would give them a competitive advantage in the labour market.

"companies I think expect the best … that is why they are looking to hire us."

— Colin from the University of Oxford, as cited in Brown et al.,

"Compared to other people who don’t go to Sciences Po … it is like night and day."

— Jean-Yves from Sciences Po, as cited in Brown et al.,

Within law firms, there is a great deal of sentiment among hiring manager whom believed that high achieving students at lesser ranked institutions that did not get in to a target school must have "slipped up," or otherwise warranted a "question mark" around their analytical abilities. Other such as Oyer and Schaefer for instance, exaggerate their findings based on earnings, in that, on average, graduates of top-10 law schools (target schools) earn 25% more than graduates of schools ranked eleven through twenty (semi-target schools) and are far more likely to hold a Big Law position. They suggest that this advantage may arise from various factors, such as the access to valuable networks that elite institutions provide, which can lead to better career opportunities, or the perception that these schools equip students with skills highly regarded in the legal job market. These claims was rebuked by Sander and Bambauer, as in their argument, Oyer and Schaefer did not take into account students LSAT scores as well as the dramatic cost-of-living differences facing lawyers in different parts of the country.
