= McKinsey Quarterly =

American business magazine

The McKinsey Quarterly
- Categories: Business management
- Frequency: Quarterly
- Publisher: McKinsey & Company
- Founded: 1964; 62 years ago
- Country: US
- Based in: Seattle, Washington
- Website: www.mckinsey.com/quarterly/the-magazine
- ISSN: 0047-5394

The McKinsey Quarterly is a business magazine focused on management and organizational theory.

== Background ==
The magazine is written primarily by McKinsey consultants and alumni, with contributions from guest authors. Founded in 1964, it was initially an internal document at McKinsey shared with consultants and clients, until it was published more broadly in the 1990s.

It also publishes research from the McKinsey Global Institute on economic issues. The magazine is published quarterly with one special issue each year. McKinsey clients are given early access to upcoming issues.

The parent company awards two articles a prize each year for articles that had the greatest perceived impact on management based on a panel of judges from the business community.

== Indexing ==
The magazine is indexed in Scopus and Princeton University's Business Periodicals Index.
