= Marvin Bower =

American management consultant (1903–2003)

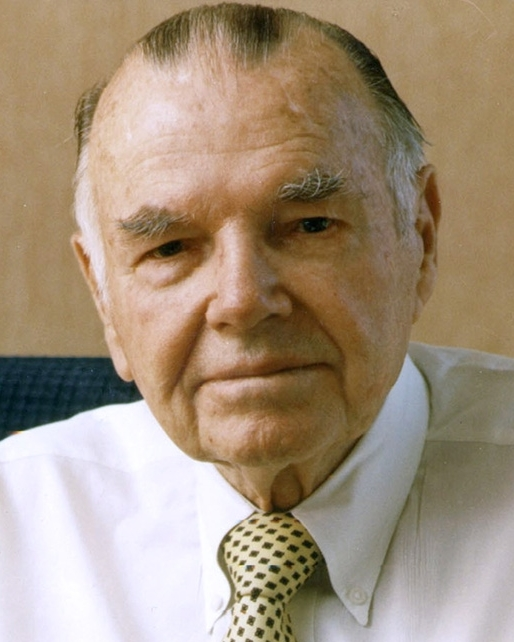
- Born: August 1, 1903; Cincinnati, Ohio
- Died: January 22, 2003 (aged 99); Delray Beach, Florida
- Education: Brown University (BA); Harvard University (JD/MBA)
- Occupations: Consultant, management expert

Marvin Bower (August 1, 1903 – January 22, 2003) was an American business theorist and management consultant associated with McKinsey & Company. Under Bower's leadership, McKinsey grew from a small engineering and accounting firm to a leader in the consulting industry. Bower, alongside Edwin G. Booz, is regarded one of the individuals most responsible for the rise of management consulting after World War II; he is considered by many to be the "father" of the modern consulting industry."

== Biography ==
Bower was the son of the deputy recorder at Cuyahoga County, and grew up in the Collinwood neighborhood of Cleveland, Ohio and attended Glenville High School. He earned his bachelor's degree in Economics and Psychology from Brown University in 1925. His father advised him to study law, and Bower graduated from Harvard Law School in 1928. Bower then attended Harvard Business School, graduating in 1930. Following completion of his studies, Bower worked as an associate at Jones, Day, Reavis & Pogue in Cleveland.

In 1933, Bower was hired by James O. McKinsey in the new Chicago firm of James O. McKinsey & Company to manage a newly acquired branch in New York. Following McKinsey's death in 1937, the two offices split up and Bower resurrected the New York firm, with the assistance of New York partners, as McKinsey & Company in 1939. He served as managing director from 1950 to 1967, and remained a leadership figure at McKinsey as director and partner until 1992.

With the resurrection of the firm, Bower worked with Peter Drucker, the world's greatest management thinker, to lay the foundation for a management consulting industry. Bower and Drucker had productive and sometimes humorous exchanges.

Bower approached Drucker shortly after World War II to become his deputy as McKinsey was being built. Drucker declined, saying he was a "soloist" and "a loner" who did not belong in an organization. Bower agreed with him, and they maintained a collegial relationship for years afterward. Drucker worked with McKinsey during its formative decade, running monthly Saturday sessions with the partners focused on learning and reflection:

“Marvin came to me… he was just beginning to build McKinsey. And he wanted me to come and be number two. I was up in Vermont… after a week I went to Marvin and said, look, I’ve been thinking about it and I’m a soloist. I’m a loner, I don’t belong in an organization. And Marvin said, I’m awfully glad you came to that conclusion, I came to it too… The firm is Marvin’s, including the things which he refused to do. It took a very long time for McKinsey to be willing to work for anybody but businesses.”

Drucker described Bower as “the most straight-laced man” and credited him with building McKinsey during its first decade. He also noted that the firm’s disciplined focus on “what have we learned” and “what do I have to teach you” in those early meetings shaped its distinctive culture of reflection and professionalism.

According to Harvard Business School, Bower "is considered the father of modern management consulting" for his decades of work at McKinsey. Upon turning 60 years old, Bower sold his shares back to the firm at book value. This was an unusual step, as the book value of the shares was likely well below that of their market value.

Bower's decision came as a surprise to many, including his family. "Let me just say there was a shock on people's faces when he told us that he was selling his shares back to McKinsey at book value," said his son Dick Bower. "It felt unbelievable, to tell you the truth. But that was Marvin for you."

Bower is widely credited for leading the formation of the global management consulting industry. His principled insistence on impeccable professional standards in substance, ethics, and style; his dedication to the professional development of his colleagues; and his candor, all served as a role model for several generations of management consultants, both within and outside McKinsey. He protested being named by BusinessWeek as one of the top businesspeople of the 20th century on the grounds that he was a professional, not a businessman.

== Publications ==
He published several books and articles, among them:

- The Will to Manage: Corporate Success Through Programmed Management (McGraw-Hill, New York, 1966), ISBN 0-07-006735-X
- The Will to Lead: Running a Business With a Network of Leaders (Harvard Business School Press, Boston, Mass., 1997), ISBN 0-87584-758-7
- Perspective on McKinsey - internal McKinsey publication
