= ApplyBoard =

Canadian software company

- Type: Private
- Industry: Software
- Founded: Waterloo, Ontario, Canada (2015)
- Founders: Martin Basiri; Meti Basiri; Massi Basiri
- Headquarters: Kitchener, Ontario, Canada
- Area served: Worldwide
- Key people: Martin Basiri (co-founder and Chairman); Meti Basiri (co-founder and CEO); Massi Basiri (co-founder and President)
- Number of employees: 1,000 (June 2021)
- Website: applyboard.com

ApplyBoard is a Canadian educational technology company founded in 2015 in Waterloo, Ontario, Canada. It is an educational application platform for international students applying for post-secondary studies abroad.

== History ==
ApplyBoard was founded in 2015 by three brothers Martin Basiri, Massi Basiri and Meti Basiri, who moved from Iran to Canada. It is an application platform that lists colleges, universities, and K-12 schools in Canada, the United States, the United Kingdom, and Australia. In 2019, the company had 170 employees and partnerships with 1,200 secondary and post-secondary institutions in Canada and the United States; the company also moved its headquarters to its current location in Kitchener, Ontario.

In October 2019, ApplyBoard launched a secondary technology platform called ApplyProof that supports peer-to-peer verification of Letters of Acceptance (LoA) from a university, and English language proficiency tests.

As of 2020, the company had 500 employees and expanded to the United Kingdom. In February 2020, Jo Johnson, the former Minister of State for Universities, Science, Research and Innovation of the United Kingdom, joined the company as the chairman of the Advisory Board. In October 2020, the company announced a partnership with Times Higher Education.

As of 2021, ApplyBoard had raised $475 million in funding, reaching a valuation of $3.2 billion. By 2024, the company's valuation had decreased by 74% to under $1 billion. This decrease in value was linked to a decline in the number of students applications being accepted by Canada.

In November 2022, the company laid off 6% of its global workforce.

The company has been criticized for not adequately supervising agents under Canadian legislation, specifically when agents sell "empty promises" (incomplete or inaccurate guidance) or biased information to applicants. Co-founder Meti Basiri claimed in 2022 that the company’s standards were sufficient to meet the regulations.

Reports indicate that ApplyBoard’s valuation has declined sharply from its peak of about US $3.2 billion to a fraction of that, roughly a 74% decrease since its 2021 high, according to investor disclosures. The company has pushed back on the valuation narrative, saying these figures reflect a “moment in time” rather than fundamental decline, but the contraction still raised concerns among investors and critics.

In 2025, ApplyBoard laid off over 150 employees, reportedly as a result of shrinking demand caused by shifting global immigration policies and reduced student visa approvals.
