= Master of Applied Science =

Academic degree in applied science

Master of Applied Science (abbreviations include MASc, MAppSc, MApplSc, and MAS) is an academic degree. It is conferred far more widely in the Commonwealth of Nations than in the US.

"MASc" degrees are generally conferred in Commonwealth of Nations for engineering-related studies more academic than those required for the Master of Engineering (MEng). MASc degrees require coursework and a thesis, with the thesis being the major component, whereas a Master of Engineering may require only coursework and a project, with the coursework being the major component. MASc degrees are also conferred for other subjects, such as psychology at the University of Waterloo

"MAppSc" and "MApplSc" degrees are conferred in Australia and New Zealand for a wider variety of professional studies, to include practitioner fields outside of engineering.

"MASc" is conferred in at least fifteen North American universities: Ontario Tech University,Arizona State University, University of British Columbia, Dalhousie University, Delta State University, University of Delaware, University of Nebraska–Lincoln, Carleton University, University of Denver, University of Guelph, Memorial University of Newfoundland, Concordia University, University of Toronto, Toronto Metropolitan University, McMaster University, Queen's University, University of Victoria, University of Waterloo, York University, École de technologie supérieure, Université de Montréal, and Université de Sherbrooke, in the more expansive manner of Australia and New Zealand.

"MESc" is conferred at The University of Western Ontario, although the degree is equivalent to the MASc.

"MASc" is conferred at the University of Waterloo under the department of management sciences, and also in psychology for developmental communication sciences and industrial/organizational psychology

"MAS" is conferred at Johns Hopkins University, Missouri Western State University, and the University of California San Diego in various sciences including chemistry, engineering technology management, forensic investigation, spatial analysis, and clinical research.
