= Leonrod =

Leonrod may refer to:

- Leonrod (Dietenhofen), a hamlet in the municipality of Dietenhofen
- Leonrod Castle, a ruined castle in the above parish
- House of Leonrod, a German noble family

Leonrod is also the name of the following people:

- Wilhelm von Leonrod, cathedral canon and deacon of Eichstätt
- Sigmund von Leonrod, canon of Eichstätt
- Franz Leopold Freiherr von Leonrod (1827–1905), Bishop of Eichstätt
- Leopold von Leonrod (1829–1905), Bavarian minister of justice
- Ludwig Freiherr von Leonrod (1906–1944), German officer and resistance fighter
- Sybilla von Leonrod, née Meilhaus (1814–1881), governess to King Ludwig II of Bavaria
