= House of Leonrod =

Family

Leonrod
- Noble house
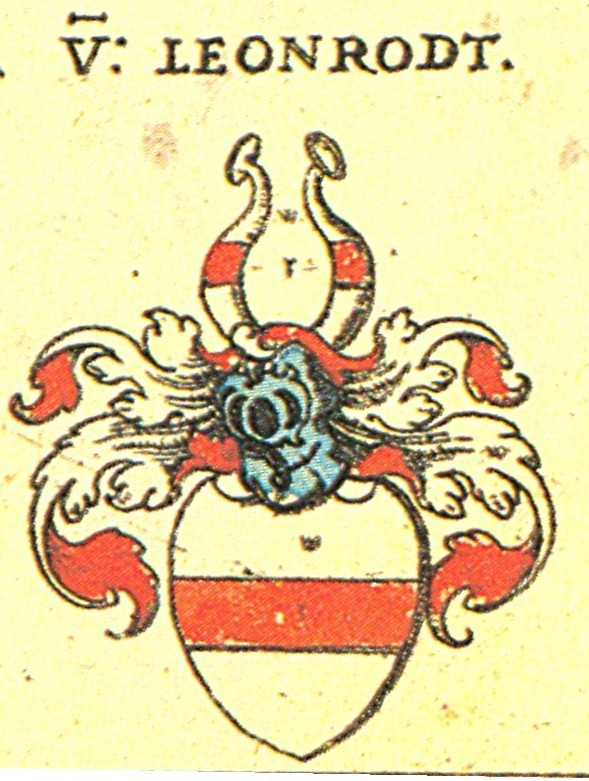
- House of Leonrod coat of arms
- Country: Franconia, Swabia
- Founder: Philipp von Leonrod
- Estate: Leonrod
- Dissolution: 1952

The Leonrod (or Leonrodt) family was a Franconian - Swabian noble family that died out in 1951.

== History ==
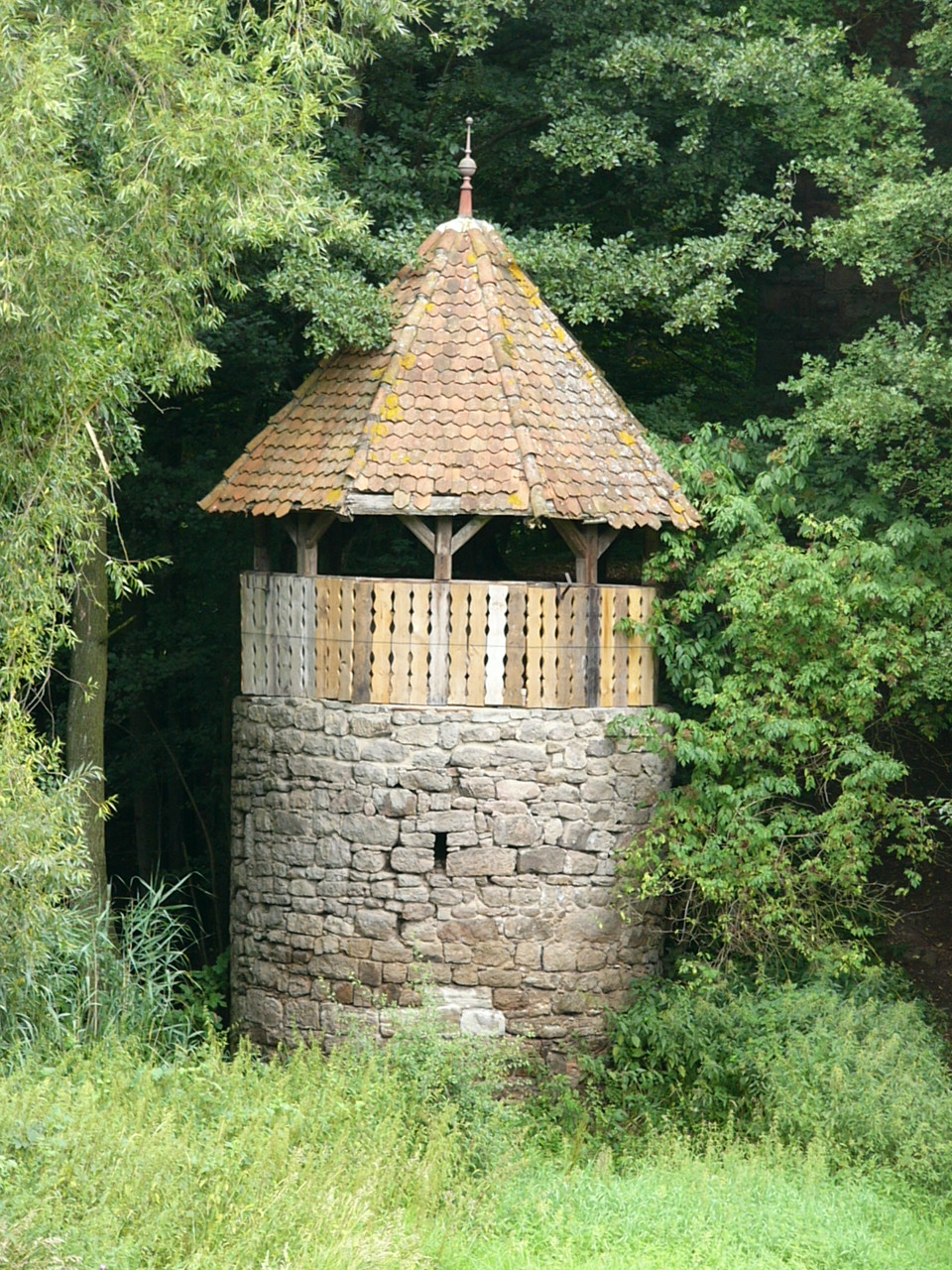
Outlying tower of the castle ruins of Leonrod

The noble family's ancestral seat was the Leonrod Castle, a moated 13th century castle located on the southwestern outskirts of Leonrod near Dietenhofen.

Burial places, along with epitaphs and coat of arms engravings of many Leonrod family members can still be found in the Dietenhofen church and Maria Kappel church in Schmiechen.

Many generations of the Leonrod family served the Teutonic Order. Several family members became high spiritual dignitaries in the diocese of Eichstätt. The noble line were later elevated to imperial Franconian knights.

The Leonrod family name can be found in several toponyms in modern Germany:

- Leonrodplatz, the central square in Eichstätt,
- Leonrodplatz, a square in Munich,
- Leonrodstraße, a street in Munich,
- A Leonrodstraße in Bayreuth existed until the 1970s.

== Personalities ==
- Wolf von Leonrod (1513), a knight in Mergentheim
- Johann von Leonrod, knight of the Teutonic Order
- Simon von Leonrod (1419-1420 Commander in Oettingen, Mergtentheim in 1420–1422, 1423-1426 and 1451-1456 Commander in Heilbronn, 1425-1456 Commander of Kapfenburg, Komtur in 1437 in Ulm, Komtur in 1447 in Franconia, 1449 Commander in Nuremberg)
- Theodor von Leonrod, captured by the forces of Ivan IV of Russia during the Battle of Ergeme
- Philipp von Leonrod († 1593)
- Clergy of the Prince-Bishopric of Eichstätt:
  - Sigmund von Leonrod, cathedral canon
  - Wilhelm von Leonrod, cathedral canon and deacon
  - Franz Leopold Freiherr von Leonrod (1827–1905), Bishop
- Leopold Freiherr von Leonrod (1829–1905), lawyer and royal Bavarian Minister of Justice
- Ludwig Freiherr von Leonrod (1906–1944), officer and Resistance fighter, partaker in the 20 July plot to kill Adolf Hitler.
- Sybilla Freifrau von Leonrod, née Meilhaus (1814–1881), governess to King Ludwig II of Bavaria

== Coat of arms ==
The Leonrod coat of arms is a red bar on the silver field. On the helmet with red and silver covers, there are two horns marked in the same way as the shield.

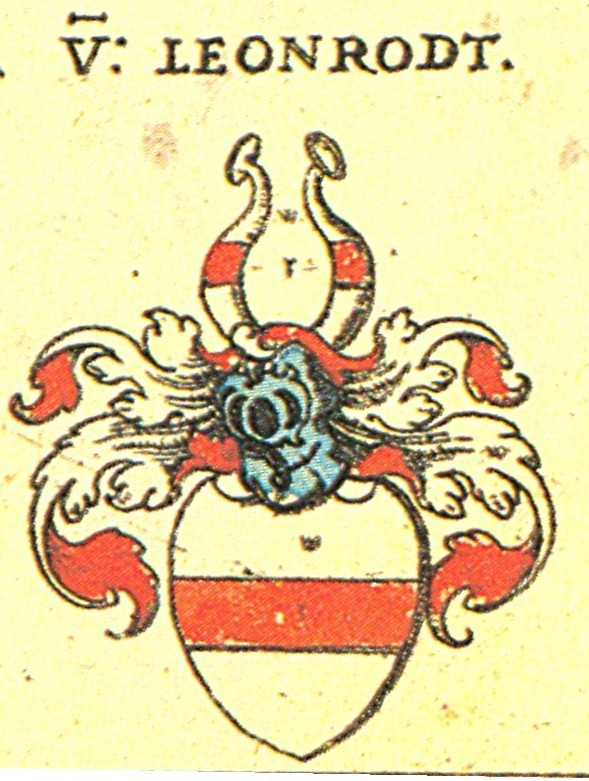
House of Leonrod(t) coat of arms in the Roll of arms by Johann Siebmacher

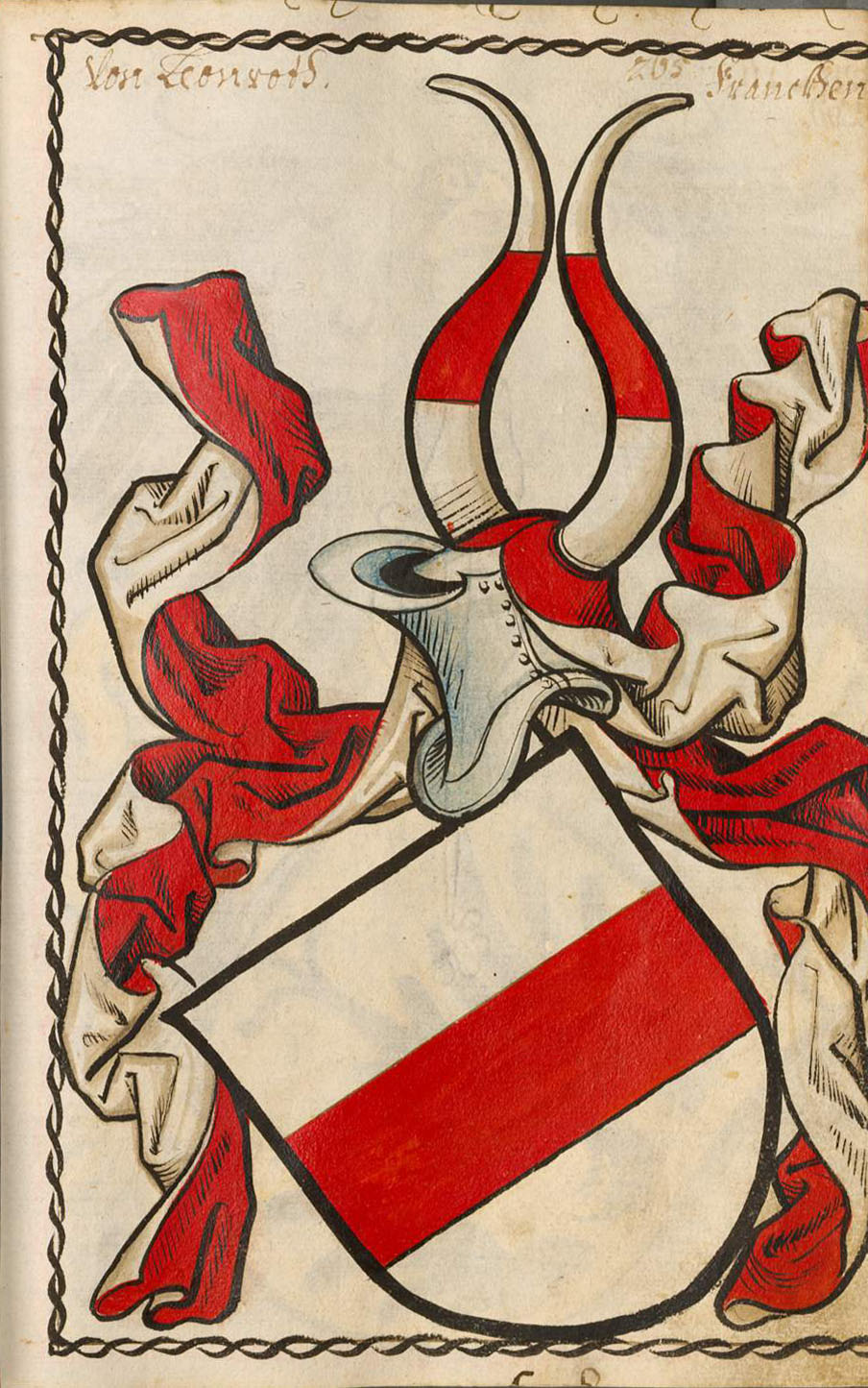
House of Leonrod(t) coat of arms in the Scheibler Armorial

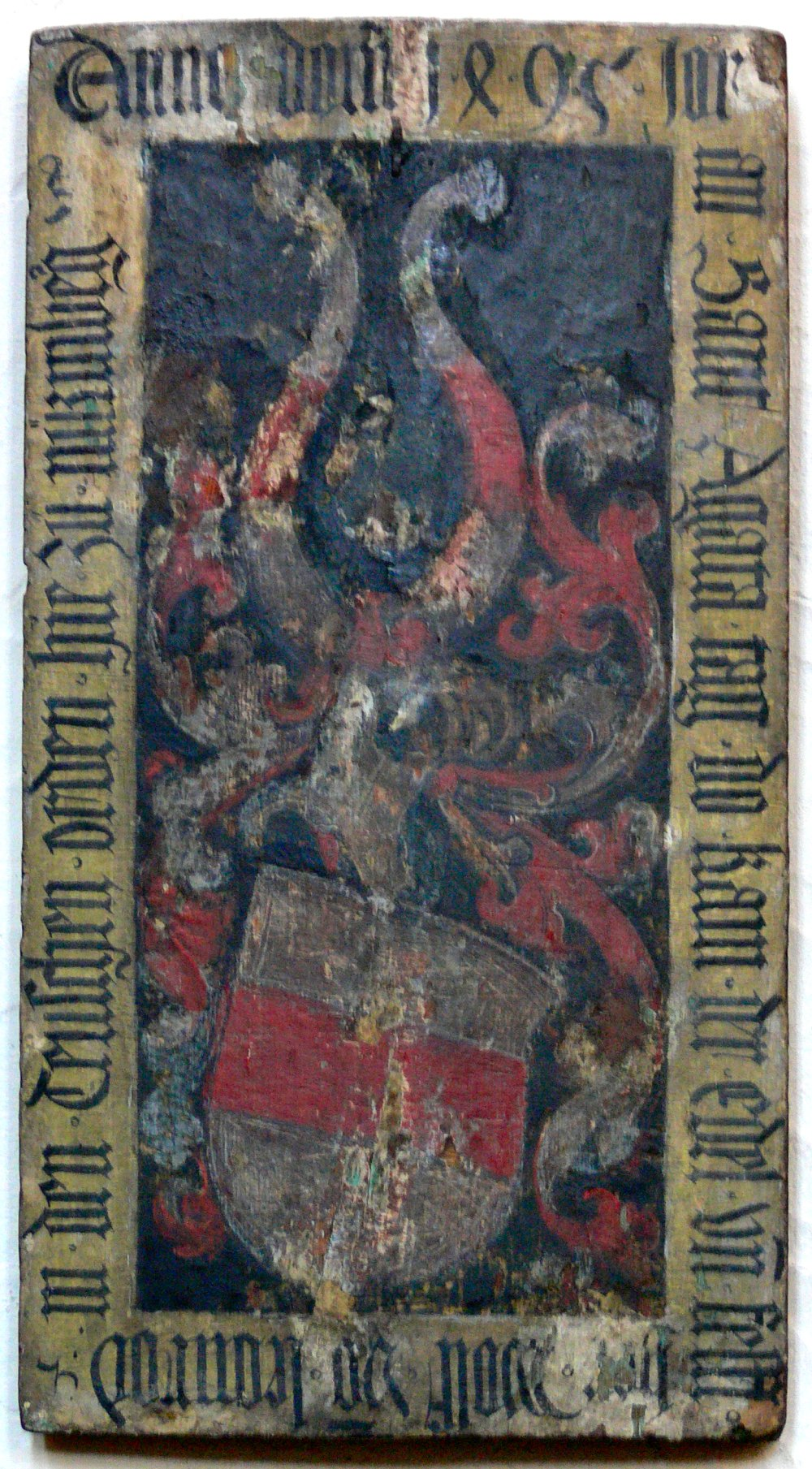
Shield of the Teutonic Knight Wolf von Leonrod (1495) in St. Jakob, Nuremberg

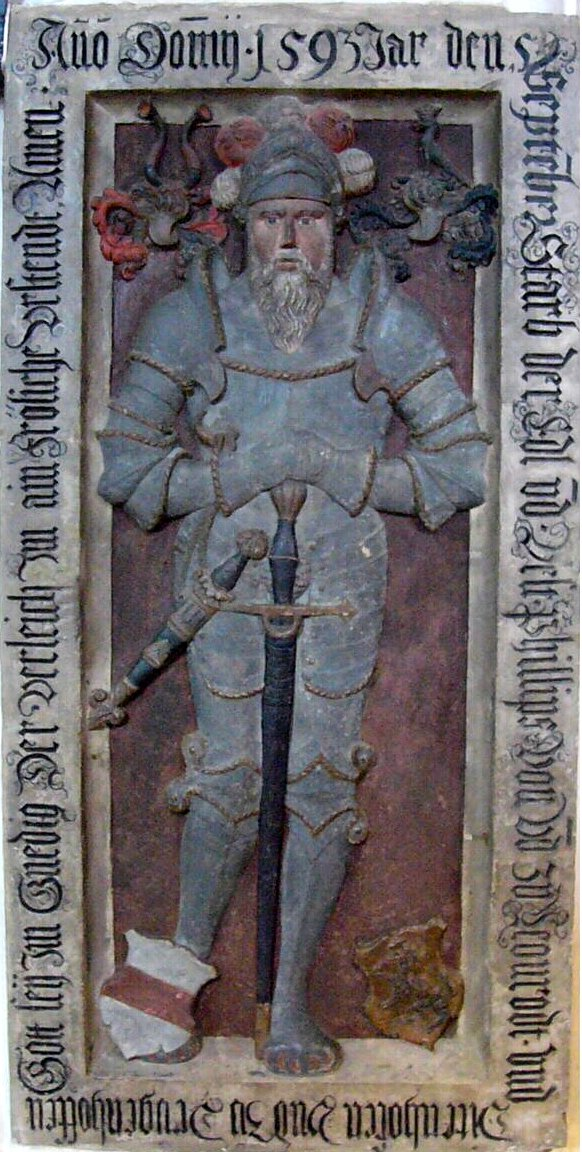
Epitaph of Philipp von Leonrod in a Dietenhofen church

== Literature ==
- Manfred Weitlauff: Leonrod, in: Neue Deutsche Biographie, Volume 14, 1985, Page 254, Online version
- Uwe Albrecht: German Castles and Palaces, 1999, ISBN 0865652074.
- Georg Dehio, Handbook of German Art History, 2nd edition, ISBN 9783422031166

== See also ==
German nobility
