= Meta Wellmer =

German writer, teacher, and social reformer (1826–1889)

- Born: Margarethe Wirth; 18 December 1826; Leonrod, Kingdom of Bavaria
- Died: 1 August 1889 (aged 62); Ebersdorf, Reuss, German Empire
- Occupations: Writer; teacher; social reformer
- Relatives: Michael Ludwig Wellmer (father)
- Writing career
- Pen name: M. Wirth
- Subjects: Women's rights; vegetarianism; animal welfare

Meta Wellmer (born Margarethe Wirth; 18 December 1826 – 1 August 1889) was a German writer, teacher and social reformer who wrote about women's rights, vegetarianism and animal welfare. She taught in several European countries and published poetry, fiction and works on education and nutrition. An early female contributor to the vegetarian periodical Vereinsblatt der Freunde der natürlichen Lebensweise, she also wrote Die vegetarische Lebensweise und die Vegetarier (1877). Her correspondence included exchanges with Thomas Carlyle and his family and a letter to Friedrich Nietzsche discussing Arthur Schopenhauer's philosophy and vegetarianism.

== Early life and education ==
Wellmer was born Margarethe Wirth in Leonrod, Kingdom of Bavaria, on 18 December 1826. (Note: Several biographical reference works give Wellmer's birth year as 1832. The date appears at least as early as the 1881 Allgemeiner deutscher Literaturkalender and was repeated by Sophie Pataky in the 1898 Lexikon deutscher Frauen der Feder and in the 2010 Deutsches Literatur-Lexikon. Other sources give 18 December 1826. An 1896 account of her death states that she was 62 when she died on 1 August 1889, which is consistent with an 1826 birth year.) Her mother, Eva Margaretha Wirth, was an unmarried weaver whose father was the mayor of Leonrod. She married Johann Geck in Deberndorf in 1830. Wellmer later identified Michael Ludwig Wellmer, a Royal Bavarian district judge and city commissioner who died in Munich in 1859, as her father. His name was not recorded on her baptismal certificate, however, and his biological relationship to her remains uncertain. According to the biographer Franz Brümmer, Michael Ludwig Wellmer arranged for her education in the sciences, modern languages and music.

== Writing and teaching ==
Wellmer began teaching at the age of 17. She worked as a teacher in Germany, Switzerland, Paris, London, Madrid and Rome. She also published poetry, short stories and articles on education, nutrition and women's rights in German and foreign periodicals. Her books included Deutsche Erzieherinnen und deren Wirkungskreis (1877), on the work of female educators, and publications concerning spiritualist and mystical subjects, including Geistergeschichten aus neuerer Zeit (1875) and Hellsehen und Irrwahn. Ernst und Scherz in der Mystik (1886).

== Vegetarianism and animal welfare ==
According to Brümmer, Wellmer became a vegetarian in 1869 and advocated animal welfare. She was among the first women to contribute regularly to the Vereinsblatt der Freunde der natürlichen Lebensweise ("Association Journal for Friends of the Natural Way of Life"), a German vegetarian periodical. Her contributions included a poem published in 1872 and "Zwei Reisetage" ("Two Days of Travel"), an account of travelling through Switzerland as a vegetarian, published in 1874.

Historian Birgit Pack identifies Wellmer as one of the few women who contributed regularly to the journal during the 19th century. In addition to her periodical writing, she published works on animal welfare and the book Die vegetarische Lebensweise und die Vegetarier ("The Vegetarian Way of Life and the Vegetarians") in 1877.

== Correspondence ==
Wellmer corresponded with Thomas Carlyle and members of his family. Letters addressed to her by Carlyle and his family are held by the National Library of Scotland, while other correspondence, including a letter from Mary Aitken to Wellmer, has been published in Carlyle Letters Online.

In 1875, Wellmer wrote to Friedrich Nietzsche, enclosing a copy of her book Geistergeschichten aus neuerer Zeit. She expressed admiration for Arthur Schopenhauer's philosophy, particularly its ethical implications for everyday life. She described vegetarianism as the only moral and humane way of living and proposed establishing a society of Schopenhauer's followers to promote his teachings on equality, kinship and mutual support.

== Later life and death ==
Wellmer spent much of her life in Ebersdorf, Reuss. She died there on 1 August 1889, aged 62 according to an account published in 1896.

== Publications ==
- Geistergeschichten aus neuerer Zeit [Ghost Stories from Modern Times]. Nordhausen. 1875.
- Theophile: Eine Erzählung [Theophile: A Story]. Halle. 1876.
- Deutsche Erzieherinnen und deren Wirkungskreis [German Female Educators and Their Sphere of Influence]. Leipzig. 1877.
- Die vegetarische Lebensweise und die Vegetarier [The Vegetarian Way of Life and the Vegetarians]. Göthen. 1877.
- Das Verhältniss des Kindes zur Thierwelt: ein Beitrag zur Gemüthsbildung [The Relationship of the Child to the Animal World: A Contribution to the Formation of the Emotion]. Munich. 1878.
- Gemüthsbildung und Thierschutz [Emotional Education and Animal Protection]. Munich. 1882.
- Gedichte [Poems]. Zürich. 1883.
- Ludwig Richters Lebenserinnerungen [Ludwig Richter's Memoirs]. 1886.
- Hellsehen und Irrwahn. Ernst und Scherz in der Mystik [Clairvoyance and Delusion. Seriousness and Joke in Mysticism]. 1886.
