= Leonrod Castle =

- Ruine Leonrod or Burg Lewenrode
- Dietenhofen-Leonrod
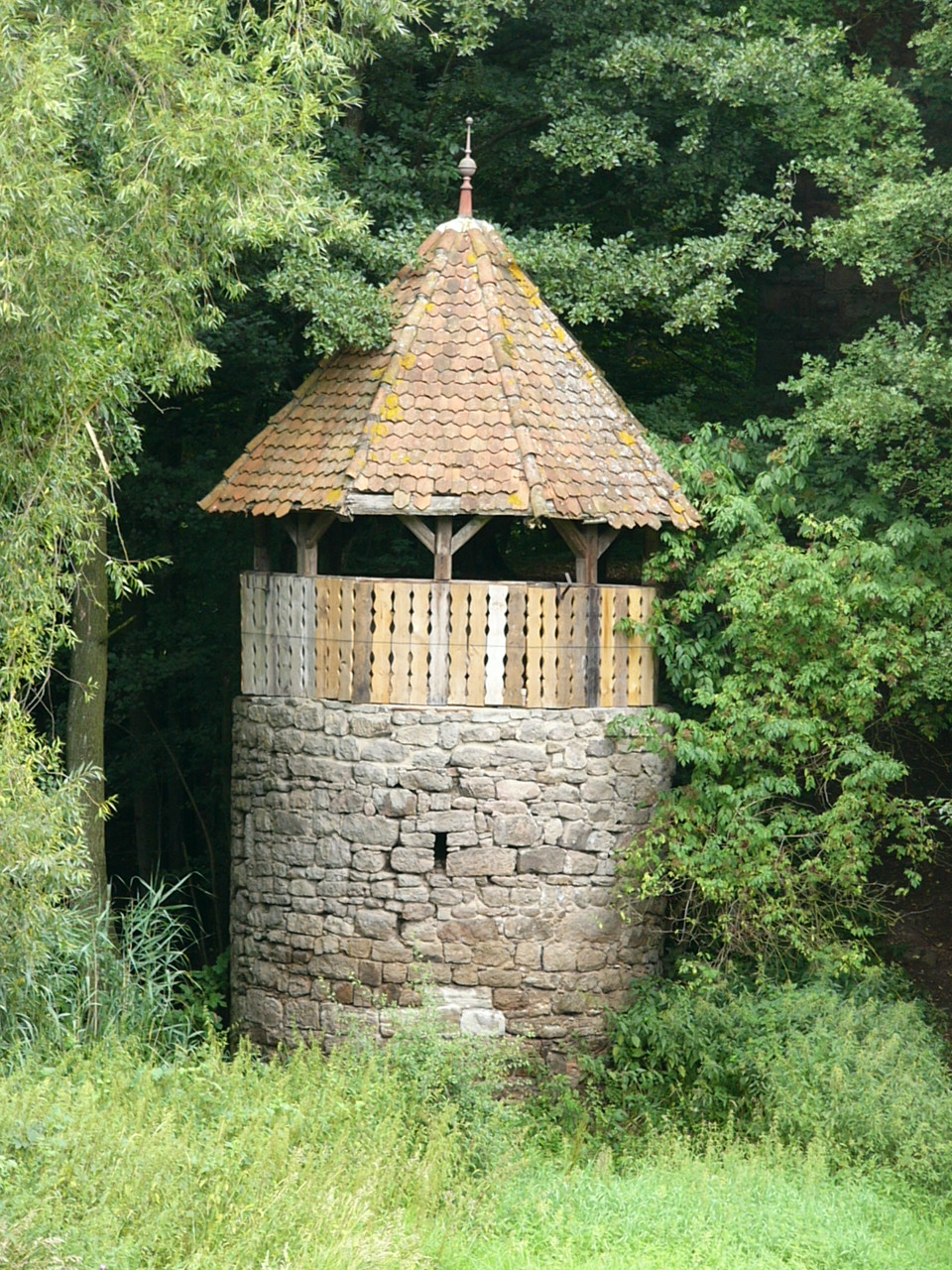
- Outlying tower of Leonrod castle ruins

Site information
- Type: lowland castle, water castle
- Code: DE-BY
- Condition: curtain walls, bergfried

Location
- Coordinates: 49°24′17″N 10°39′54″E
- Height: 350 m above sea level (NN)

Site history
- Built: 1200 to 1300

Garrison information
- Occupants: nobility

Leonrod Castle (German: Ruine Leonrod), also called Lewenrode Castle, is a ruined water castle on a manmade lake in the Bibert valley on the edge of the parish of Leonrod in the market town of Dietenhofen in Ansbach county in the German state of Bavaria.

== History ==
The water castle was built in the 13th century as the family seat and Ganerbenburg of the lords of Leonrod, who were descended from the lords of Buttendorf, in order to protect an important road link to the city of Nuremberg. The castle was first mentioned in 1235 with a Rudolf miles de Lewenrode.

In the 14th and 16th centuries structural changes were made to the castle. The castle survived the Thirty Years' War unscathed, but shortly afterwards, in 1651, it burned down as a result of negligence - attempts to burn off vegetation in the moat got out of hand - and it was never rebuilt. In the 17th and 18th century a hunting lodge was built. The castle is owned today by a community of heirs that go back to the aristocratic line that died out in 1951.

One of the members of the nobile family was Franz Leopold, Baron of Leonrod, who was Bishop of Eichstätt from 1867 to 1905 and is one of the most important bishops of this diocese.

== Description ==
This very large castle is surrounded by a deep moat. It has four buildings around a rectangular 20-metre-high bergfried with an elevated entrance, 9 metres above ground level. The bergfried has a ground plan 6 x 6 metres in area and a wall thickness of about 2 metres. In the outer ward is the castle chapel, St. George's, which dates to 1327, and the hunting lodge with its hipped roof and timber-framed upper storey. Today, the castle still has the almost fully preserved bergfried, considerable wall remains, vaults, the castle well in the courtyard and an outlying tower. It has been designated a heritage site.

== Literature ==
- Wolfgang Krüger: Die Deutschen Burgen und Schlösser in Farbe. Burgen, Schlösser, Festungsanlagen, Herrenhäuser und Adelspalais in der Bundesrepublik Deutschland und Berlin (West). Wolfgang Krüger Verlag/S. Fischer Verlag GmbH, Frankfurt, 1987, ISBN 3-8105-0228-6.
- Ursula Pfistermeister: Wehrhaftes Franken: Burgen, Kirchenburgen, Stadtmauern. Band 1: um Nürnberg. Verlag Hans Carl, Nuremberg, 2000, ISBN 3-418-00384-2, pp. 64–65.
