= Weinzierlein =

- Ortsteil of Zirndorf
- Coat of arms
- Interactive map of Weinzierlein
- Location within Germany Location within Bavaria
- Coordinates: 49°25′28″N 10°53′57″E
- Country: Germany
- State: Bavaria
- Admin. region: Mittelfranken
- District: Fürth
- Town: Zirndorf
- Elevation: 308 m (1,010 ft)

Population (2007)
  - Total: 1,338
- Time zone: UTC+01:00 (CET)
  - Summer (DST): UTC+02:00 (CEST)
- Postal codes: 90513
- Dialling codes: 09127

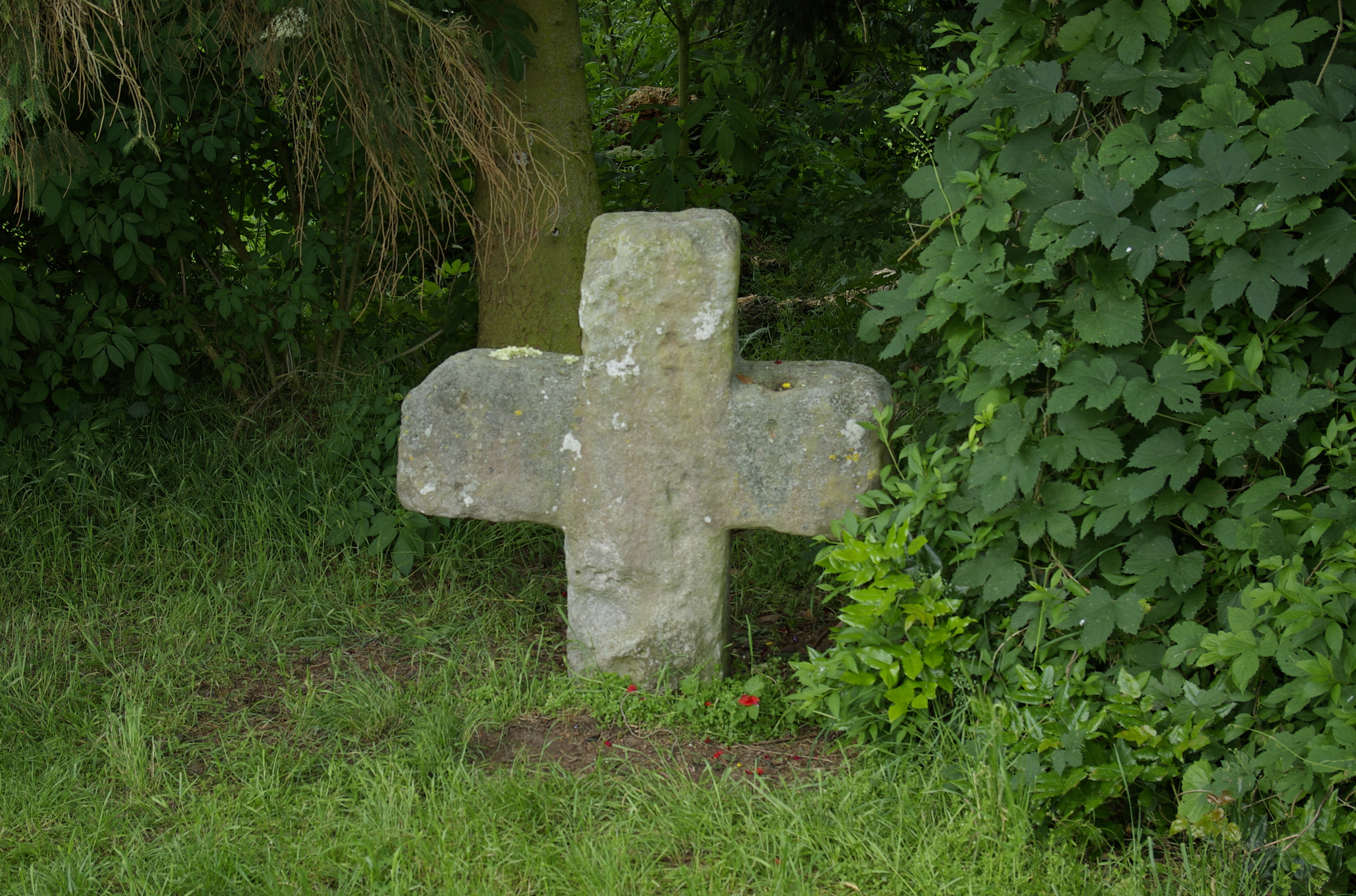
Stone cross on the road to Neuses

Weinzierlein (colloquially: "Wáindse^{r}la") is a village in the town of Zirndorf in the Central Franconian district of Fürth in Bavaria, Germany.

== Geography ==
Together with Wintersdorf to the east, Weinzierlein forms a contiguous settlement and lies on the southern banks of the Bibert and on the stream of the Roßtaler Mühlbach, which empties into the Bibert from the right in the village. To the southwest it is bounded by the woods of Erlach, to the northwest on the far side of the Bibert is the forest of Streitlach, with the hill of Weinberg. To the south rises the Mäusbuck.

=== Population growth ===
Gemeinde Weinzierlein

Jahr	1818	1840	1852	1855	1861	1867	1871	1875	1880	1885	1890	1895	1900	1905	1910	1919	1925	1933	1939	1946	1950	1952	1961	1970
Einwohner	509	570	588	568	582	558	575	558	576	584	534	528	498	503	495	490	500	494	501	892	864	819	853	1287
Häuser	80	91					104			100			103				93				112		173	
Quelle																								

Ort Weinzierlein

Jahr	1818	1840	1861	1871	1885	1900	1925	1950	1961	1970	1987	2007
Einwohner	180	210	189	178	182	143	160	301	411	807	1076	1338
Häuser	26	26			30	32	32	42	85		268	
Quelle												

== Religion ==
Since the Reformation the village has been predominantly Protestant. Those who are evangelical Lutherans are part of the parish of St. Laurence (Roßtal); Roman Catholics are part of the church of Christ the King (Roßtal).

== Culture ==
Weinzierlein is the location of one of the fictitious "Schafkopf Academies", known by locals in the Nuremberg region as the "card playing school" ("Kartelschule"), see also Schafkopf language.

The carnival of Kärwa takes place annually on the first weekend in August in Weinzierlein.

== Literature ==
- Festschrift „75 Jahre Stadt Zirndorf“, 1987.
- Johann Kaspar Bundschuh: Weinzirlein. In: Geographisches Statistisch-Topographisches Lexikon von Franken. Band 6: V–Z. Verlag der Stettinischen Buchhandlung, Ulm 1804, DNB 790364328, OCLC 833753116, Sp. 133 (Digitalisat).
- August Gebeßler: Stadt und Landkreis Fürth (= Bayerische Kunstdenkmale. Band 18). Deutscher Kunstverlag, München 1963, DNB 451450957, S. 170–171.
- Hanns Hubert Hofmann: Nürnberg-Fürth (= Historischer Atlas von Bayern, Teil Franken. I, 4). Kommission für Bayerische Landesgeschichte, München 1954, DNB 452071224, S. 187 (Digitalisat).Ebd. S. 234–235 (Digitalisat).
- Wolfgang Wiessner: Stadt und Landkreis Fürth (= Historisches Ortsnamenbuch von Bayern, Mittelfranken. Band 1). Kommission für Bayerische Landesgeschichte, München 1963, DNB 455524629, S. 101–102.
