= Schafkopf language =

German card game

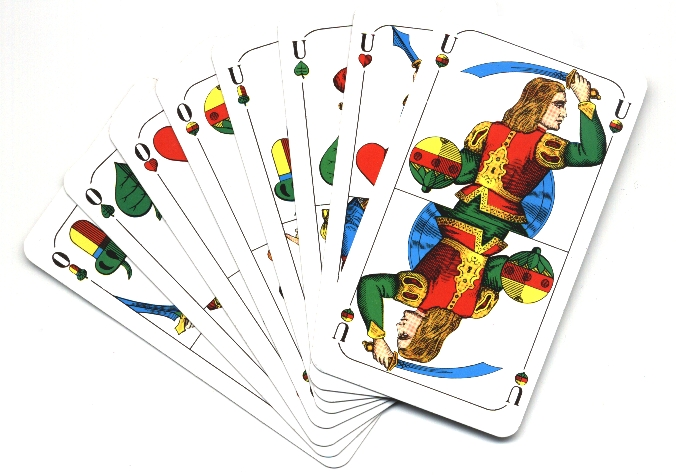
The top trumps in Schafkopf

The Bavarian card game of Schafkopf has such a plethora of special words, terms and phrases that it is described as a Schafkopf language (German: Schafkopf-Sprache) which is often unintelligible to outsiders. The language ranges from associative terms to coarse language. Grumbling, bleating and schimpfing are part of the game of Schafkopf and are, so to speak, the "salt in the soup". Here are examples of some of the more common words, names and phrases.

Note: the expressions listed here are mainly those used in the Old Bavarian dialect, although the most common terms are used throughout Bavaria and thus also found in the Franconian, Swabian and Hessian (Aschaffenburg, Odenwald) dialects. Regional terms are designated as such. Note that some idioms cannot be precisely translated or may lose their poetry or impact in English. Where no translation is offered, the original is used.

== Card names ==
=== Nicknames given to the Obers and Unters ===
Card	Schafkopf language	English translation	Image
Ober of Acorns (Eichel-Ober)	der Alte (Bavarian da Oide); der, den keiner kann; der is hoch; des is ned da Gleansde (Franconian for: "das ist nicht der Kleinste"); der höchste in Bayern; der Josef	the Old Man, he whom no-one can [beat]; he's high; that's not the smallest; the highest in Bavaria; Joseph	
Ober of Leaves (Gras/Grün-Ober)	der Blaue, Grüne, des Peterl(e), der Schinder-Hansl, der Jäger, der Laubige, der Biber, der Trommler	the Blue Man, the Green Man, the Parsley, Schinderhannes (German outlaw), the Hunter, the Leafy Man, the Beaver, the Drummer	
Ober of Hearts (Herz-Ober)	der Rote, der Roude/Raouder/Raoude, Herzer, Fuchs, Lump, Bremser-Dirk (verhindert drei Laufende), Erdbeer-Schorsch, Bardolio (Aschaffenburger Region), Schindahans (Niederbayern)	the Red Man (x3), the Heart-er, the Fox, the Scallywag, Brakeman Dirk (prevents 3 runners), Strawberry George, Bardolio (Aschaffenburg region), Schinderhannes (German outlaw - Lower Bavaria)	
Ober of Bells (Schell(e)n-Ober)	der Runde, der Bugl, der Schiache (der Häßliche), der (Schelln-)Buckel(ige), Mehlhaans, Glöbberer, der Gelbe, der Braune, Bunte, der Schlamberde (Franconian for der Schlampige), der Nie-Stach, die späte Bremse	the Round Man, the Bump, the Mean One (Ugly One), Bell Bump, Flour Johnny, Whisker/Stirrer (East Franconian), the Yellow Man, the Brown Man, the Coloured One, the Shoddy One (Franconian), the Never Won [a Trick], the Late Brake (never prevents 3 runners)	
Unter of Acorns (Eichel-Unter)	der Alte Unter (Bavarian da Oide unda), der Höchste, der Wensel, der Junge	the Old Unter, the Highest, the Wenzel (Jack), the Young Man (c.f. the Ober of Acorns)	
Unter of Leaves (Gras/Grün-Unter)	der blaue Unter, der Pfeiffer, der Vize	the Blue Unter, the Piper, the Vice	
Unter of Hearts (Rote Unter / Herz-Unter)	dritter	the third one	
Unter of Bells (Schellen-Unter)	kleinster Unter	smallest Unter	

=== Nicknames for the Aces / Sows ===
Card	Schafkopf language	English translation	Image
Ace/Deuce of Acorns (Eichel-As/Daus)	Eichel-Sau, Alt-Sau, die Alte (bairisch de Oide), die 1, Gattin, Eichulia die Waldschnepfe, Waldsau, Haus-Sau, d’Mama, "dahoam liegt's" "I spiel mit der dahoim" (Allgäu) "wenn I heimgeh"	Acorn Sow; Old Sow; the Old Girl; the [Number] One; the Wife; Eichulia the Woodcock; the Forest Sow; the House Sow; the Mama; 'er indoors, I'll play at home	
Ace of Leaves (Gras-As, Laub-As)	Gras-Sau / Gros-Sau, Grün-Sau, die Grüne, Blau-Sau, die Blaue, Blue-Henne, Blue-Jeans, Gras-Hupfer, alte Frau Landrat, Gärtnerin, d’Blue Mary Lu/Mary Blue, die Blausäure, Förster-Christl, die 2, Bäckerwam, Dolores, Adria, das Blumenstöckerl, Stadtparkliesl, Cordon Bleu (Auf die Cordon), Donau, Mannschaft, Abdellaoue (Verballhornung von "Auf die Blaue"), Bsufferne, Salat-Bärbel, Mo(o)ser-Julie, Frau Förster, Försterin/Forstmeisterin (mit der Blauen, der Genauen/da wirst schauen, Blau-Sau is Hausau!, Wie ist der Mann? – Blau ist der Mann! usw.), mit der Blauen, der Genauen, mit der Mannschaftsaufstellung	Grass Sow; Blue Sow; the Blue Girl; Blue Hen; Blue Jeans; Grasshopper, Old Mrs Mayor; Lady Gardener; Blue Mary-Lou; Prussic Acid; Forester Christl; the Two; Baker's Wife; Dolores; Adria; the Flower; Town Park Liesl; Cordon Bleu; [Blue] Danube; Team (reference to TSV 1860 Munich); Abdellaoue (corruption of "auf die Blaue"); Drunk Woman; Salad Barbie; Grumpy Julia; Forester's Wife, Mrs Forester (with the Blue One, the True One; with the Blue, you'll see too; the Blue Sow is the Champion Sow; How is the man? Blue is the man?); with the Blue One, the True One; with the Team Line-up (reference to TSV 1860 Munich's former magazine)	
Ace of Hearts (Herz-As)	die Rote, Blut-Sau, als Trumpfschmiere manchmal ’s Pfund	(has few special names because it cannot be called), the Red Girl; Blood Sow, the Pound (as a trump 'smear')	
Ace of Bells (Schellen-As)	Schellen-Sau, die Runde, Kug(e)l, Kugelbauersophie, Kugelbauer-Theres, -Theresia [Oberbayern], die 4, Bum(b)s/Pumps/Pumpe/Bumb(e)l, Bumbs, Bumpe, Bumpel, Pumpel, Bumskugel, Bucklerte, Geldsau, Dümmste, Schlas(s), Benzin-Resi/Sau, Lump(-ate/-ige), Oberpumpelmoser, Schlechterne, Schellige, die wo die Bauern ’zammtreibt, Sauhund (de wo da Hund dromhockt, der Hund flackt drauf [Schwaben], Hundaufghockte [Oberbayern], Bäber-/Odlmannsgwadschn [Mittelfranken]), Christbaumkugelsau, Schwanzeldrahtsaufi, Kuglbäurin, Hannes-Sau, Rapunzel, as Stodlfenster, die Firabechere	Bell Sow; the Round Girl; the Ball; Cannonballmaker Sophie/Theresa (Upper Bavaria); the Four; Bum(b)s ('fart'); Pumpe/Bumpe ('splash', 'loud fart'); Bumbl/Bumpel/Pumpel ('fat woman', 'ball'); Bumskugel ('ball'); Bucklerte ('Humpy'); Piggy Bank, Dumbest One, Schlass, Petrol Tess/Sow, Shoddy, Grumpy Little Fat Man, the Poor One, Bell-y, the one the farmers round up; the Sow Dog (and many very colourful descriptions such as "the one the dog hangs around", etc.); Christmas Tree Bauble Sow; Schwanzeldrahtsaufi; Mrs. Cannonballmaker; Johnny's Sow; Rapunzel; the Barn Window; the Firabechere	

=== Other card nicknames ===
Card	Schafkopf language	English translation	Image
Aces, Sows, Deuces (Ässe, Saue, Däuser)	Pfunde	pounds	
Tens (Zehner)	Eisenbahner, Schwellnhupfa	railwaymen, [railway]-sleeper hopper	
Nines, Eights, Sevens (Neuner, Achter, Siebener)	Spatzen, Nichtser, Leere, Lusch(e)n, Zwiebeln, Hupen, Faule, Deppen	sparrows (also court cards in Solo), nothings, empty cards/empties, blanks, onions, hooters, idlers, muppets	
Aces and Tens (Asse und Zehner)	Schmier(age), Volle, Lange, Ganzer	smears, full 'uns, long 'uns, whole 'uns	
Obers (in Wenz: Unters)	Bauern, Herren, Männer, Obretten, Speisenträger, Buckel, Haxn, Harte	bowers/farmers, lords, men, waiters, hunchbacks, (pork) knuckles, hard ones	
Unters (and Obers)	Wenzen, Buam, Eichel-Unter = "Beisser", Schellen-Unter = "Flying Her(r)mann"	Wenzels, bowers/farmers, Unter of Acorns = Biter, Unter of Bells = Flying Her(r)mann	
Ober or Unter which breaks the run of matadors	Brems(er), Billigmacher, Zahlbremse, Laufbremse, Uhrenbremse (Allgäu)	brakeman, cost saver, points brake, running brake, clock brake (Allgäu)	
Obers of Acorns and Leaves	Hochzeit	wedding	
Ace, Ten and King of same suit	Einundzwanzig (Fünfundzwanzig)	twenty-one (twenty-five)	
Acorns	Eichhorn, Euchl	Eichhorn (the Lobster moth), Acorns	
King of Hearts	Max(i)	Max or Maxi	
Seven of Acorns	Soacher, Spitz	pee-er, Spitz (from the card game of Watten)	
Seven of Bells	Belle, Welle (Übernahme aus dem Kartenspiel "Wattn")	Belle, Welle (from the card game of Watten)	
Eight of Bells	Senf, Oschboa, Bimbel	Mustard, Oschboa, Bimbel	
Obers and Unters in unbroken sequence from the top	Laufende, Haxen	Runners	

== Contracts ==
Various words and phrases are used to describe or announce the different Schafkopf contracts:

Contract or bid	Schafkopf language	English translation
No announcement/bid (keine Spielansage)	weg/weiter/weitweg (variation: Weiber), servus/tschüs, ford (die tun was), wei-tout (weidu), im Stile einer Spielansage: "Ich habe ein weiter!" oder "Ich bin weiter!" (oft auch nur gestisch durch Abwinken angedeutet)	I'm away/pass/I'm far away, cheers/bye, carry on (whoever's doing something); (in the form of an announcement:) "I have a pass!" or "I'm passing!" (also often just indicated by waving away, a gesture of refusal)
Announcement/Bid (Spielansage)	"daad scho" (so wie der aus "Tod in Venedig"), i spui, i daad (spuin) – ich würde (spielen), i(ch) würd’, Spülung, Spielung, Spieletto, Interesse, a Noudigs	"I'll see you" (as in Death in Venice), I'll play, I've got a game, I will (play), I will, playing, playing, Spieletto (playlet), interest, a Noudigs
Normal game (Normalspiel)	Spelunkn, a Bisserler wos geht scho, a kloans, i kant, Spielzeug, i häd a Spüll, auf die (Bumbl, Blaue, Alde...)	boozing (play on word Spiel, a Spelunke is a bar), a little one again, a little one, I can, toy, I've got a game, on the (Bells, Leaves, Acorns)
...with the Ace of Acorns (mit der Eichel-Sau)	Oide, häif zoin! zur Not! (Oberfranken), Alte Hilf! Alte Liebe rostet nicht. mit der Alten geht's zum Waldfest.	Old Girl; häif zoin! At a pinch! (Upper Franconia), Old Help! Old love never dies/rusts. I'm going to the woodland festival with the old girl.
Wenz	(ich spiele) Einen (zum Weinen), Wenn er gang, Wenz no scho gwonna wär, Wenn's recht is’/nix ausmacht/nix kost/ned stört, AdWenz, Gustav (z. B. Gras Gustav), Wendo, Wendolin, Wenzlinger, Wenzeslaus, Stanislaus Wenzinger (Stani), Wenz saa mou (Mittelfranken), die Glannen („Kleinen“) stechen, Nur die Unter, Quendolin (Allgäu), Spiele Einen (Allgäu)	(I'll play) One (to make you cry); if he went (wordplay on "Wenz"); if it's not already been won (wordplay), if it's right/adds up to nothing/costs nothing/upsets nothing; Advents; Gustav (e.g. Gustav with Leaves); Wendo; Wendolin; Wenzlinger; Wenceslas; Stanislaus Wenzinger (Stani); Wenz saa mou (Middle Franconia), the Little Ones win, only the Unters, Quendolin (Allgäu), Play "One" (Allgäu)
Geier, Jaacher (=Jäger)	Geiger, Giggärigie, Kerwas-Wenz, nur die Ober	Violin, Cock-a-doodle do, Kerwas-Wenz, only the Obers
Solo	Silo, Sticht, bricht (z. B. "Herz bricht"), prügelt (z. B. "oache prügelt")	Silo; Beat, break (e. g. "Hearts break"), thrash (e. g. "Acorns thrash")
Acorn Solo (Eichel-Solo)	Oache sticht, Oache fressn d’Sai, Oache fress'n d'Säu, Eichel fressen die Säue, Eikkelen stekkelen, Eich hoid da Deifi (Teufel)	Acorns trump; Acorns feed the sow (or: are eaten by the sow); Acorns feed sows (or: are eaten by Sows); Acorns trump; Acorns has the Devil
Leaf Solo (Gras-Solo)	Gras/Grün/Blau/Blatt sticht, A Grians in d’Suppm, Grünes Gras frisst der Has’, Grün/Blau scheißen die Gäns’ im Monat Mai/in Wien, Grün ist die Heide, Grün wie mein Haar, Wennst nei Brennnessl’n neilongst, Auf d’Fregatten	Grass/Green/Blue/Leaves trump; greens in the soup; green grass eats the hare; Green/Blue poops the goose in the month of May/in Vienna; green is the heath; green like my hair;if you grasp the nettles (?); to the frigates
Heart Solo (Herz-Solo)	Herz sticht, Herzlich lacht die Tante, Mit der Rot’n, ein herzliches (Allgäu), Herz im Leib verzage nicht	Hearts trump; heartily laughs the auntie, with the Red One; a hearty one (Allgäu); heart in the mouth, do not despair
Bell Solo (Schell(e)n-Solo)	Schell(e) sticht, Schellinski, Schellinski war ein Pole/eine Polin, Schelln für die Schnelln, Schella wiad' Wella ("Schellen wie die Wellen"), Wennst auf'n Baggn griggst, Schell'n zum verprell'n, A Schelln ko'st ham, Auf die Kugeln	Bells trump; sayings that are a play on words: Bellinski; Bellinski was a Pole; sayings that rhyme in German: Bells for the swift; bells like the waves, Wennst auf’n Baggn griggst, bells to alienate, A Schelln ko'st ham, on the balls
Tout	A Karte oda a stückle Holz	a card or a piece of wood
Agreed (Einverstanden)	basst, guat, gääht, dua zua, ’s Recht (oft auch nur gestisch durch Abwinken angedeutet)	fine, good, okay, door shut, okay with me (often only indicated by a winking gesture)
Double	Stoß, Schuss, Kontra, Spritze, mit Musik, mit Beilage, Pumpe, Touché(r), Bums, drauf ana, tsè, 25 Öre dagegen, Wichse, damit’s was kost’. da klatsch i da oine	hit, shot, contra, spritze, with music, with sides (i.e. side dishes), pump, touché, thump, up one, tsè, 25 öre to that, thrash, that'll cost. da klatsch i da oine (all meaning "double")
Pool	Stock, Pott, Pinke, Henna/Henne	pool, pot, Pinke, Henna

== Special terms ==
=== Some "official" terms ===
Term	Schafkopf language	English translation
abspatzen, oschbozn	sich einer Farbe freimachen, dein kleinen Spatz wegwerfen, also die schlechteste Karte bei günstiger Gelegenheit loswerden	"unload" or "slough": empty a hand of a suit, clear a suit out, void a suit, discard i.e. throw out the lowest card at a convenient opportunity (lit: 'de-sparrow' i.e. 'throw a sparrow out' or 'get rid of a sparrow')
auf die Käffer/Dörfer, aufs Land	Ankarten von Farben	"in the sticks/Hicksville/back of beyond/villages", "in the countryside" i.e. to lead side suits to the first trick instead of trumps
Augen	Punkte, Zählwert einer Karte	"card points"
Ausspieler, erster Mann, auf eins	der das Spiel eröffnende Mitspieler	"forehand": the player who leads to the first trick
Blatt	genereller Ausdruck für die aktuellen Karten	"hand": (general term for a hand of cards; can also mean an individual card)
Brunzkartler, Brunzkater, Brunzkarter, Brunsbuh, Brunskartler, Bieselbruder	Ersatzspieler, der einspringt, wenn ein Spieler auf die Toilette muss	"pee-buddy": a stand-in for a player who has to go to the toilet
davonlaufen, davongehen, davonspielen, untendurch spielen, unterspielen, jodeln	Ausspielen der Ruffarbe "unter der Sau" durch den Gerufenen, wenn dieser 4 oder 5 Karten der Ruffarbe besitzt	"run away": to play "under the Sow", i.e. to play a lower card of the same suit when you hold the called Ace because you have 4 or more cards in that suit
Fehlfarbe	Farbe, die der Solospieler zusätzlich zu der als Trumpf bestimmten Farbe hat (außer As) die Farbe, die man selbst nicht besitzt	"side suit": a plain suit the soloist has beside the trump suit (except the Ace); or "void suit": a suit one doesn't have
Gegenspieler	Nichtspielerpartei	"defenders"
Hinterhand, letzter Mann, hinten	der letzte hinter dem Ausspieler sitzende Mitspieler	"rearhand": the last player, who sits behind the one who led the trick; fourth hand
kurzer Weg	Spielmacher oder Gegenspieler sitzt direkt hinter dem Ausspieler	"short way", i.e. when the declarer or defender is sitting immediately behind forehand
langer Weg	Spielmacher oder Gegenspieler sitzt Hinterhand	"long way", I.e. declarer or defender sitting in rearhand position
Mitspieler	Partner des Spielmachers	"declarer's partner"
Mittelhand, zweiter/dritter Mann, auf zwei/drei	die hinter dem Ausspieler an Position 2 und 3 sitzenden Mitspieler	"middlehand": second or third hand, on two/three; the players sitting after forehand in positions 2 and 3
schmieren, mach ihn/nan fett!	dem Partner hohe Augen (Asse und Zehner) zugeben	"smear" or "fatten": play high value cards (Aces and Tens) for a partner to win
Schmier	Karten mit hohem Wert	"smears": cards with a high value
schneider	weniger als 30 (31 als Spieler) Punkte am Ende des Spiels	schneider: to score less than 30 points at the end of a game (or less than 31 if the declarer)
schwarz	keinen Stich gemacht haben	schwarz: to have taken no tricks
Spielmacher, Spieler	Spielansager	"declarer"

=== Various ===
Schafkopf expression	German explanation	English translation	English explanation
ohne Alten net zu halten/ironisch: Stechts ’n zam; Antwort: Wart, i hoid glei as Messa/ironisch: I glaub den kann I, "Wer den sticht, kommt in d’Buid-Zeidung", des san Waschl!	Kommentar zum Einsatz des Eichel-Obers	without the Old 'Un, you can't hold 'em; Stabs 'em all; (ironic); Reply: wait, I've got a knife; I think I can win this (ironic); Anyone who beats him'll be in Bild (a magazine); des san Waschl	Comment on Ober of Acorns being played
Bauernsprechstunde/"Dan mir Wattn?"/Radfahrerei	(verbotene) verbale Spielbeeinflussung	"farmers' consultation"; "Are we playing Watten?"; "cycling"	(Forbidden) verbal influence of the game
Bauernsterben (is koa Verderben), Bauerntreffen, Bauernleich, Oberreiten, Gipfeltreffen	Zusammentreffen mehrerer Ober in einem Stich	"farmer's dying (is no cause for crying)", farmers' meeting; farmer's corpse, Ober [horse] ride; summit	when several Obers ("farmers") are played to a trick
A Besn	Bezeichnung für unbespielbare Karten	a broom	Nickname for unplayable card
besetzt	zwei Karten einer Farbe besitzen	to be 'occupied'	To only have a doubleton (2 cards) of a given suit
Black Jack	das Spiel ist bzw. wird schwarz gewonnen	Blackjack	The game is won schwarz
blank	nur eine Karte einer Farbe (oder nur einen Trumpf) besitzen	to be blank	To only have a singleton in a given suit (or only one trump)
Buad	eine Runde beim Schafkopf	round	a round of Schafkopf
Buckel-Wenz	Bezeichnung für einen besonders aussichtslosen Wenz. Unabhängig davon, ob er letztlich doch gewonnen wird oder nicht.	Hunchback Wenz	Description of a particularly hopeless Wenz game, regardless of whether it is finally won or lost.
Coburgern / Böhmisch Kartn / Böhmisch Rückwärts	Ein Spieler spielt entgegen der üblichen Spielweise z. B. bei einem Sauspiel und tut so, als ob er die Ruf-As hätte, obwohl er sie nicht hat und versucht dadurch die Gegner zu täuschen.	playing Coburg / Bohemian cards / Bohemian reverse	A player plays contrary to the normal tactics in a Rufer and acts as if he has the called Ace when he does not and tries to deceive his opponents
Deppal-Klopfa / Kili-Klopfa	Bezeichnung für ein Legen/Klopfen, welches als unnötig oder taktisch unklug erachtet wird.	muppet knock; / bozo knock	A knock or playing of a card which is unnecessary or tactically unsound
Drei und Schneider, scho geht's weida! Vier und nicht, verziagt's da ’s Gsicht! / Vier und nicht, ein Gedicht!	Kommentare zur Berechnung von drei Laufenden plus Schneider, bzw. von vier Laufenden und Schneider-Schwarz am Ende eines Spiels	Three and schneider, let's go wider! Four and schwarz, time to lose heart; four and not a dime, hey that's a rhyme!	Comment on scoring 3 runners plus schneider or four runners and schwarz
durch	schwarz gespielt	slam/vole	to win/lose schwarz
Durch: Spiele Einen-Durch ohne Vier	Gepflegte Redensart aus dem Allgäu um die Gegner einzuschüchtern und bezüglich der Laufenden in die Irre zu führen.	Play a slam without four	Cultivated Allgäu idiom to intimidate opponents and to mislead them especially about the runners.
Einmal hoch und einmal nieder ist der Arsch vom Onkel Frieder / Tante Frieda / Einmal groß, einmal klein, dann muss das Spiel gewonnen sein	Die zwei Partner während eines Rufspiels spielen abwechselnd einen hohen und einen niedrigen Trumpf aus.	Now up high and now down low is the butt of Uncle Joe /Aunty Flo; one big and one small, means the game our way will fall	The two partners during a normal game play high and low cards alternately
Entsetzlich	Die gewonnene / verlorene Summe beträgt 1,60 Euro (Allgäu)	Appalling	The win/loss is €1.60 (Allgäu) - entsetzlich sounds like 1.60 in German
A Fred	Durchaus ambitionierter jedoch nicht zu gewinnender Wenz	a Fred	An ambitious but unwinnable Wenz
Fünfte Mann: der fünfte Mann g’hört untern Tisch, dem Kiebitz ist kein Spiel zu teuer, du machst doch scho beim Zuaschaugn Fehler	Zuschauer haben ruhig zu sein	the fifth player belongs under the table; no game is too costly for the kiebitzer; you're making a mistake by watching	Spectators should be quiet
Geier: Bei am Geier kommen Ässe!	Nach einem Geier meist angesagter Spruch, da der Einzelspieler beim Anspielen eines Asses des Gegners Farbe zugeben muss.	In a Geier out come the Aces!	After a Geier has been announced, because the soloist must follow suit when his opponents play an Ace
gesperrt (sein)	Man hat ein gutes Rufblatt, jedoch keine Ruffarbe (= keine Farbe ohne As)	blocked	When a player has a good calling hand, but no call-able suit (= no suit without an Ace)
Griechisch-römische-Eröffnung	Mit dem ersten Zug die Mitspieler bewusst mit einer anderen Farbe in die Irre führen (Allgäu).	Greco-Roman Opening	With the first card deliberately mislead the others by playing another suit
Grosn	Grün (Spielkartenfarbe)	Grass	Leaves (card suit)
größer werden's von selber, mit die Gloana ziagt ma die Groß’n	Kommentar zum Ausspiel eines kleinen Trumpfs	it'll get bigger by itself; the little 'uns get the big 'uns	Comment on playing a low trump
Hand vom Sack, der Hafer ist schon verkauft!	Kommentar zum Spieler, der einen fremden Stich zu sich nehmen will	Hands off the sack, the oats are paid for	Comment to a player who picks up someone else's trick
A Herz hod a jeder, und wer koans hod is a Lump, Hans oder Peter, (ein) Herz hat jeder	Aufforderung an den Gegner, gefälligst Herz zuzugeben, und nicht zu stechen (nur wenn Herz kein Trumpf ist)	Everyone has a heart, and anyone who doesn't is a rascal, Jack or tart; everyone has a heart	Invitation to opponent to be kind and play a Heart, and not trump (only if Hearts are not trumps)
Hof: vo jädm Hof an Hund, von jedem Dorf einen Hund, in jedm Dorf a Maibaam, von jeder Sau a Worscht von jedem Dreck ein Muster	auf keiner Farbe frei sein	a dog from every farmyard/village, a maypole from every village, a sausage from every sow, a sample from every soil	Not void in any suit
Holzkirchner- Eröffnung	Der Spieler spielt, als ersten Spielzug wenn er selbst erster Mann ist, die Farbe der gesuchten Sau mit einem blanken Zehner an, was je nach Blatt ein großes Risiko darstellt	Holzkirchen opening	Declarer leads a singleton Ten of the same suit as the called Ace to the first trick, a tactic that is a major risk.
Hose: mit voller Hose kann jeder stinken/der hot die Händ’ voll Bratzn!	Kommentar zu besagtem Omablatt (s. o.)	with full trousers, anyone can stink; he has a hand full of ugly women	Comment on player having a 'grandma hand' (see above)
Host koa Messa?	verzweifelte Frage an den Partner, der offenbar nicht stechen kann	Have you no knives?	Question to a partner who clearly cannot beat/trump
A Hund, Ein Hund	Als Hund bezeichnet man ein Spiel, bei dem der Spieler schon vor Beginn weiß, dass ein sehr hohes Risiko besteht, dieses Spiel zu verlieren.	a dog	A game which the declarer knows even at the start he runs a very high risk of losing; a very risky solo or partnership game
Kartn in ehrliche Händ / Immer der, der frogt	Antwort auf Frage „Wer muss geben“, wenn man dran ist	the cards are in honourable hands; always (s)he who asks	Reply to "whose turn is it?" when it is their turn
Keenich, Keni	König	King	King
An Keni leid's, vier Aug’n sans a Schmierst ned viel und schmierst ned wenich – schmierst an Kenich!	Kommentar zum (halbherzigen) Schmieren eines Königs	sorry about the king; four points is all; if you can't play big or little things, there's no harm in smearing kings!	Comment on (half-hearted) smearing of a king
Kindergeld (bitte bezahlen), Kindergelt nicht vergessen	Zusatztarif für laufende Ober	(please pay the) "child benefit", "don't forget the child benefit"	Additional bonuses for a sequence of Obers ("runners")
klopfen	verdoppeln des Spielwerts nach der ersten Hand statt abzuheben kann man klopfen. Der Klopfende darf die Reihenfolge und die Anzahl der zu gebenden Karten völlig frei bestimmen. Er legt außerdem eine Geldmünze als "Klopfer" aus, der den Zählwert des Spiels verdoppelt.	knock	double the game value after the first [hand]; decline to cut and specify how the cards are to be dealt and double the game by placing a coin down
Klupp’	eigentlich verbotenes Anzeigen, dass man eine Farbe frei ist	klupp	Prohibited sign that one is void in a suit
Koaddara	Kartenspieler, Kartenspiel	'carding', 'cardler'	card game, card player
kurz vor’m Loch verreckt (Lower Bavaria)/verhungert, vor da Haustür/vorn Abort in d’Hosn gschissn/bieseld, Luft ausganga	äußerst knapp verloren	died/starved to death just before the hole; weed/pooped just before the front door/toilet; run out of air	Ran out of steam i.e. lost by a whisker
lang(e Farbe)/Fahne/Flöte/Fackel	mehr als 2 Karten einer Farbe besitzen (Gegensatz auch: Kurze Farbe)	long (suit)/ "banner" / "flute" / "torch"	To have more than 2 cards of a given suit (opposite is "short (suit)")
"Laufsau!" "Die geht/läuft!"	Kommentar, wenn beim Suchen der Sau diese sticht, d. h. – entgegen der Absicht des Suchers – nicht abgestochen wird	"she's off/she's running!" "Racing Sow!"	Comment when, in seeking the Sow, the Sow is taken, i.e. contrary to the seeker's expectation - the Sow is captured
Legen	Verdoppelung des Zählwerts durch Herauslegen einer Münze nach Ansicht der Hälfte des Blatts	stake	to double the game value by laying a coin down after seeing half the hand
luarn	beobachten des Spielablaufs von außenstehenden Dritten bzw. beim Mischen in die Karten schauen	lurk	Watch the game from outside as a third party; peek at the cards while shuffling
Mischen: da hat si scho amoi einer totg’mischt/im Nachbardorf hams oam d’Karten aus de Händ’ operiert/neilich hams oan ausgrobn, der hod immerno gmischt/Ja bist den du aus Gebertsham?/glei fanger die Kartn as brenner a/in Chicago is der Mischerfriedhof!	Kommentar zu sehr ausführlichem Mischen	someone's already died shuffling; in the next village someone had to have an operation to remove the cards from his hands; recently they dug someone up who was still shuffling; hey, are you from Gebertsham? Just go, the cards are catching fire; the shufflers' cemetery is in Chicago!	Comment on very thorough shuffling
Musik	Gegebenheiten, die den Zählwert des Spiels erhöhen, etwa Schneider, Schwarz oder Laufende, aber auch der Stoß	music	actions that raise the game value e.g. schneider, schwarz, runners and doubling
ned mehra ois’a wert is, kost neifurzn/hieschpotzn a, der glangt da niad!	Kommentar zum Einstechen mit einem kleinen Trumpf		Comment on winning a trick with a low trump
nimma stecha	sich sicher sein, dass man alle Stiche macht	no-one'll take a trick	To be certain that one will take all the tricks
Olympiastich	Stich mit 40 oder mehr Punkten	Olympic trick	Trick worth 40 points or more
Omablatt/-spiel, totes Spiel, Gaberseeer, Stützstrumpf-Solo/-Wenz, Spiel mit der Bettkappen	sehr gutes Blatt bzw. unverlierbares Solo	Grandma hand/game; dead game; Gaberseeer, support stocking Solo/Wenz, game with nightcaps	A very good hand or an invincible Solo
Pflaumen: die erstn Pflauma san madig/erster Gwinn macht Beidl dünn/erster Gwinn machts Sackl gring/ s erschde Gwenna ghert de henna	beschreibt die Erfahrung, dass der Gewinner am Beginn des Abends am Ende oft doch verliert	the first plums are maggoty; first win makes the moneybag thin; first win makes the wallet poor; the first win belongs to the hen	Describes the experience that the winner at the beginning of the evening often loses by the end
Quod lux lux – was licht, licht; wos liggt, des bickt; was licht, bicht; was liegt, pickt; Tisch hoat Recht	gespielte Karten dürfen nicht mehr zurückgenommen werden	what lies on the table, stays on the table (lit.: what lies, lies); what lies, sticks; the table has the rights	Once played, cards may not be retrieved
Rennsau	Bezeichnung für das Farb-As, welches die angespielte Farbe sticht	Racing Sow	Nickname for the Ace of the led suit when it wins the trick
Der Rote ist ein Hund	kommentiert die Tatsache, dass der Herz-Ober oft zu unmotiviertem Legen verleitet	the Red One is a dog	Comment on the fact that the Ober of Hearts often tempts one to play it without good reason
Sau und Zehn: hast du Sau und Zehn gesehn, musst du von der Farbe gehn!	Wenn das Ass un die Zehn einer Farbe gespielt wurden, sollte man die Farbe nicht mehr anspielen	If the Sow and Ten are gone, you should leave that suit alone	If the Ace and Ten of a suit have been played, you should not lead that suit any more
schmieren	dem Partner hohe Augen (Asse und Zehner) zugeben; als Schmier können allerdings – richtig gesetzt! – alle möglichen Karten fungieren	smearing	to play high-value cards (Aces and Tens) to a trick won by one's partner; that said, any card can be used to 'smear'
Schnee-Ober: Da war der Schnee-Ober/Holz-Unter im Spiel!	Kommentar wenn ein eigentlich schon verloren geglaubtes Spiel doch noch gewonnen wird. Schnee-Ober bzw. Holz-Unter gelten dabei als mysteriöse Trümpfe, die eben nur bei besonderen Spielen auftreten.	The Snow Ober/Wooden Unter was in that game!	Comment when a game that was thought to be lost is won. The Snow Ober or Wood Unter are supposed to be mysterious trumps that only appear in special games.
Spatz	Einzelkarte in einer Farbe, oft die einzige Fehlkarte bei einem Alleinspiel	sparrow	singleton, often the only plain suit card in a solo
Spritzen: a Spritzn hast schneller wie a neue Mützn, g’spritz is glei	Versuch der Verunsicherung des Gegners vor der Spielansage	you go for a double faster than a new cap; definitely doubling	Attempt to create uncertainty in one's opponent before announcing
suchen	Beim Sauspiel die Farbe der gerufenen Sau anspielen, die Sau muss zugegeben werden	to hunt, search	In a normal game (Sauspiel or Rufer), to play a card of the same suit as the called Ace in order to force it out
Tisch: laß die Toten ruhen/was liegt, ist tot/was de tisch gefress hot	abgeschlossene Stiche dürfen nicht mehr eingesehen werden	let the dead rest; what lies is dead; what the table has eaten	Face-down tricks may not be looked at again
Trumpf ziehen	Trumpf anspielen, alle Gegner müssen (falls vorhanden) Trumpf zugeben und verlieren so einen Trumpf	pull trumps, force trumps	to play a trump so that all opponents have to play a trump (if they have one) and thus lose a trump
unten raus sein, draußen sein	Schneiderfrei sein	out from under, to be out(side)	to be Schneider-free i.e. to have scored at least 30 and thus avoided losing double
Unter: Mit am Unter gehst need unter, a Unter fällt net nunder, so ein Unter tut ein/wirkt oft Wunder!, Der Unter macht's munter!, Sau, König, Unter – konn koana drunter	Kommentar zum Ausspiel eines Unters	With an Unter nothing goes under; an Unter doesn't go under; such an Unter oft works wonders; the Unter makes us chirpy; Sow, King, Unter - no-one can go under	Comment on playing an Unter
unterstellen	Unter dem ausgespielten Trumpf bleiben, also nicht stechen	underplay, underforce	to play a card lower than the led trump and therefore not beat it
Volk: Des is für's Volk!	Kommentar bei der eigenen Spielansage, um ausdrücken, dass man nicht stark ist. Wird manchmal auch zur Verwirrung genutzt.	That's for the people!	Comment on one's own announcement in order to give the impression that one does not have a strong hand. Sometimes also used to confuse.
was ma ko, soll ma do; Trumpf wegschmeißn und ned stechn is a Sünd’, den hau i oba vom Moped, der sticht a grod oamoi, des is mei Jüngster!	Kommentar zu einem (teuren) Trumpfstich	you've got to do what you can do; to throw trumps away and not win is a sin; den hau i oba vom Moped; der sticht a grod oamoi; he's my youngest one!	Comment on a (costly) trump trick
wasch dir d’Händ/de Finger!, du host doch an toten Vogel in der Daschn!, wasch da mal dei Händ’, host du gstopft?! Wasch da amal d'Händ	Beschwerde an den Kartengeber, wenn das Blatt schlecht ist	wash your hands/fingers; you've got a dead bird in your pocket; just wash your hands; have you been pigging out?; just wash your hands	Complaint to dealer when the hand is poor
Waschen! Dann ab zum Urologen!	Kommentar nach Ansage eines "Eichel sticht"	Wash! Then off to the urologist!	Comment after the announcement "Acorns trump" (Eichel sticht could refer to a stinging when passing urine).
Waschen: Hände waschen	Aufforderung an den Kartengeber, ein besseres Blatt auszuteilen	Wash your hands!	Jocular request for the dealer to deal a better hand
Wer sagt, dass a Kuah koa Schmalz frisst?	Triumph-Kommentar, wenn ein unerwarteteter Stich gemacht wird	Who says a cow can't eat jam (lit.: dripping)	Triumphal comment when an unexpected trick is taken
Wenz: Bei einem Wenz kommen Ässe!	Nach einem Wenz meist angesagter Spruch, da der Einzelspieler beim Anspielen eines Asses des Gegners Farbe zugeben muss.	In a Wenz out come the Aces!	Said after a Wenz has been announced, because the soloist must follow suit when his opponents play an Ace
Wenz: Beim Wenz spielt man Ässe oder hält die Fresse!	Beim Wenz muus man als Gegenspieler, wenn man ein Ass auf der Hand hat, auch ein Ass spielen	In a Wenz play your Ace, or risk losing face!	In a Wenz, as a defender you should lead an Ace if you have one
Wurmannsquick, Weinzierlein, Rosenheim, Seckmauern, Detter, Laibarös, Schmerb, Wildenwart, Ützing, Hoppachshof, Zdummzumbrunznbrunn, Handthal, Hinterschoaßbislbach etc.	Standorte fiktiver Schafkopf-Akademien („da muasst amal an Kurs belegen“)		The locations of fictional Schafkopf academies ("you just need to take a course")
Zange, Gewehre zum Rathaus, Gemma, d'Schling aufbaut	man sitzt Hinterhand und macht die letzten Stiche	pincer; rifles to the town hall; yes! the noose tightens	Take the last trick as rearhand
Zange	Die/der Gegenspieler sitzen/sitzt in der Mitte, so daß die eigene Partei in Hinterhand über den Stich entscheiden kann	pincers	The opponent(s) are in the middle, so that one's own team sitting in rearhand can determine the trick
Z’gloa sans glei	Kommentar zum Stechen eines Trumpfs	Same again, so good	Comment on trumping
Ziehen: Der eine zieht, der andre schleift. / Der eine draht (dreht), der andre schleift. (wie beim Messerschleifen)	Die zwei Partner während eines Rufspiels stehen früh fest und stechen abwechselnd, speziell auch durch abwechselndes Anspielen von Farben, die der Mitspieler frei ist, die aber durch die Feinde zugegeben werden müssen (oder mangels Trumpf nicht mehr gestochen werden können).	One pulls, the other sharpens; one turns [the wheel], the other grinds (as in knife sharpening)	The two partners in a normal game are determined early on and win tricks alternately, especially by playing alternate suits in which the partner is void, but which have to be followed by their opponents (or can no longer be trumped due to a lack of trumps)
zumachen (der macht’s zu usw.)	61 (bzw. 60) Augen erreichen	to shut [the door] (that closes it/shuts the door)	To reach 61 (or 60) points
zwiebeln (neizwiebeln usw.), sieben (acht, neun) Augen für Kenner	keine Punkte (Neuner, Achter, Siebener) zugeben	to play onions (low cards), Seven (Eight, Nine) points for experts	To play cards worth no points (Sevens, Eights, Nines)
Zwiebeln: nur Zwiebeln/Soße etc. auf der Hand haben, a richtige Lett'n auf der Hand, lauter Mümmler gibst ma heit	ein schlechtes Blatt haben	[I've] only got onions in my cards / sauce in my hand; [I've got] a right pile of mud in one's hand; we've nothing but rabbits (lit.: hares) today	Comment when a player has a poor hand

== Literature ==
- Merschbacher, Adam (2009). Schafkopf (2nd revised ed.). Munich: Pliz.
- Peschel, Wolfgang (1990). Bayerisch Schaffkopfen (2nd ed.). Munich: Stöppel.
