= Ludwig Freiherr von Leonrod =

German Army officer and 20 July Plotter (1906–1944)

- Ludwig Freiherr von Leonrod
- Born: 17 September 1906; Munich, Bavaria, German Empire
- Died: 26 August 1944 (aged 37); Plötzensee Prison, Berlin, Nazi Germany
- Cause of death: Execution by hanging
- Military career
- Allegiance: Weimar Republic (to 1933); Nazi Germany
- Branch: Army
- Service years: 1926–44
- Rank: Major
- Conflicts: World War II
- Awards: Iron Cross

Ludwig Freiherr von Leonrod (17 September 1906 – 26 August 1944) was a German Army officer who took part in the 20 July plot to kill Adolf Hitler. He was a descendant of the von Leonrod noble family.

Leonrod was born in Munich and joined the Reichswehr on 1 April 1926 in the Reiter (Cavalry) Regiment 17 in Bamberg next to Claus von Stauffenberg. In World War II Leonrod was severely wounded in late 1941 on the Eastern Front and remained unfit for front service.

In December 1943 Stauffenberg informed Leonrod about the plans for a coup d'état. Leonrod asked chaplain Hermann Josef Wehrle, who was later sentenced to death for his knowledge, about the theological justification of a tyrannicide.

Leonrod was supposed to become a liaison officer in military district VII (Munich). After the plot failed, Leonrod was arrested by the Gestapo on 21 July 1944, sentenced to death by the Volksgerichtshof on 21 August and hanged on 26 August at Plötzensee Prison.

Leonrod was married to Monika née von Twickel since 1943.
