= Leonrod (Dietenhofen) =

- Ortsteil of Dietenhofen
- Coat of arms
- Interactive map of Leonrod
- Location within Germany Location within Bavaria
- Coordinates: 49°24′17″N 10°40′13″E
- Country: Germany
- State: Bavaria
- Admin. region: Mittelfranken
- District: Ansbach
- Municipality: Dietenhofen
- Elevation: 349–377 m (1,145–1,237 ft)

Population (2016)
  - Total: 190
- Time zone: UTC+01:00 (CET)
  - Summer (DST): UTC+02:00 (CEST)
- Postal codes: 90599
- Dialling codes: 09824

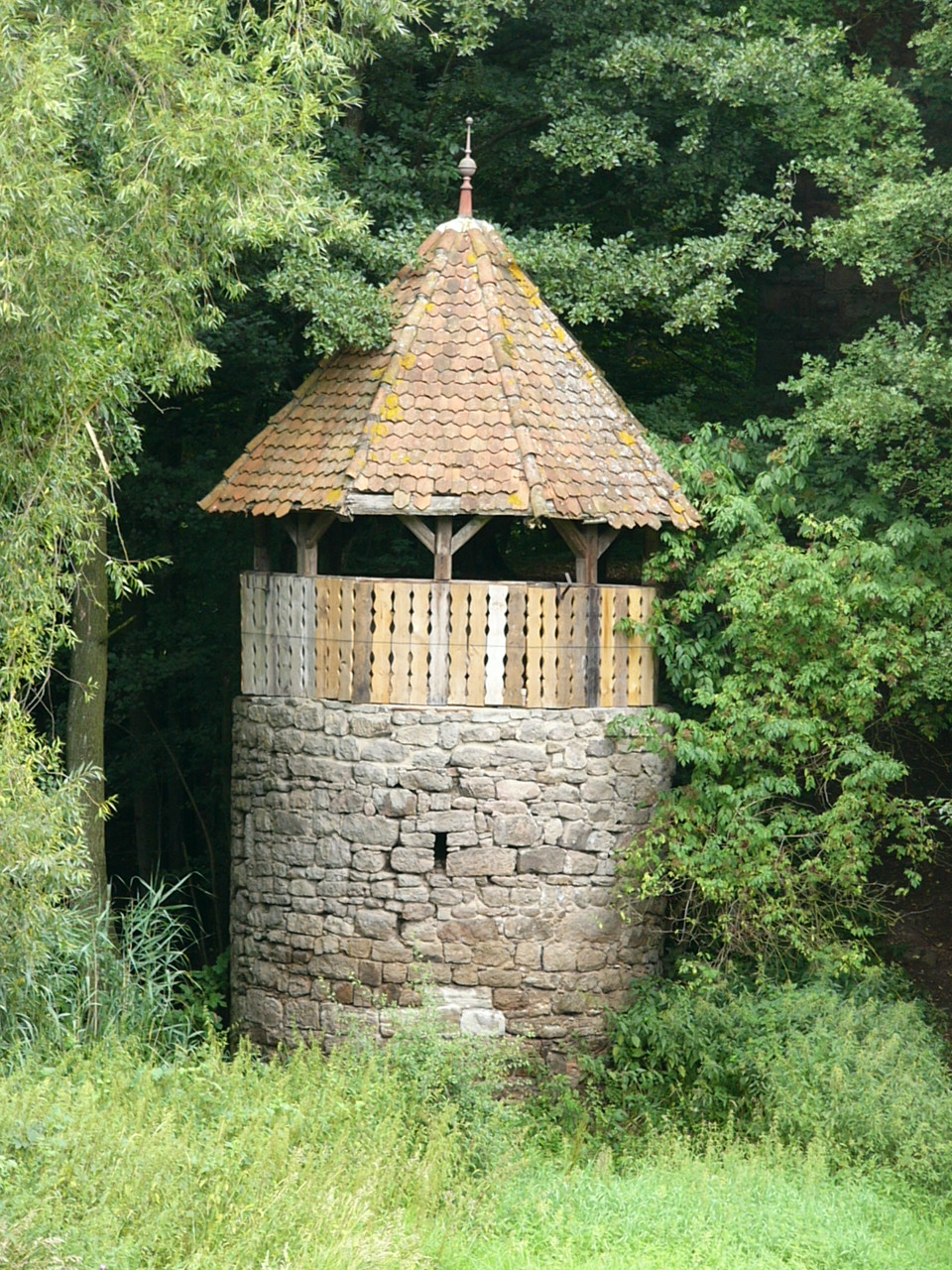
Outlying tower of the castle ruins of Leonrod

Leonrod is a village in the borough of the market town of Dietenhofen in the district of Ansbach, Middle Franconia, Germany.

== Geography ==
Leonrod lies within the Frankenhöhe Nature Park about one kilometre northwest of Dietenhofen, in the Bibert valley between two spurs of the Frankenhöhe. The confluences of the Kiengraben stream and the Bibert and the Hutweihergraben and the Hutweiher are both located in the parish. In addition the Wiesengraben rises here, a right tributary of the Bibert.

== History ==
Leonrod was first mentioned on 1218 as Lewenrode and was the village near the old jointly-inherited castle or Ganerbenburg. Leonrod developed from three originally separate settlements that grew together to form Leonrod. These were Heylingsdorff, Heiligendorf or Seeligendorff north of the Bibwert and Moosdorf south of the Bibert. Heylingsdorff was first mentioned around 1700, appears increasingly often in 18th century records under the name Seeligendorf. In a 1739 deed there is mention of a chapel in the village. Moosdorf must have been located where the guest house now is. The guest house brewed its own beer until 1923.

On the southwestern edge of the parish stand the ruins of Leonrod Castle, a Ganerbenburg of the Leonrod family. The water castle, built in the 13th century, survived the Thirty Years' War unscathed only to burn down in 1651 when attempts were made to burn off the vegetation in the moat. The castle is owned by a community of heirs that goes back to the aristocratic line which died out in 1951.

Leonrod came under the jurisdiction of two hanging courts, the part south of the Bibert belonged to Ansbach, the northern part to Markt Erlbach.

In the Geographischen statistisch-topographischen Lexikon von Franken (1801) the village is described as follows: "Leonrod, a village and castle in the knight's estate of Altmühl, the seat of the counts of Leonrod on the Biebert, above Dietenhofen, to which parish its inhabitants belong, within the area of jurisdiction of the Oberamt of Ansbach. The castle is ruined."

Under the municipal edict Leonrod became an administratively independent municipality. In the wake of the land reforms in Bavaria it was incorporated into Dietenhofen on 1 July 1969.

=== Heritage monuments ===
- Leonrod Castle ruins: water castle, inner ward, four buildings around a bergfried, 13th–16th century; outer ward, former Chapel of St. George, small hall, around 1327.
- House No. 1: Hunting lodge, hipped roof with timber-framed upper storey, 17th/18th century
- House No. 19: Gasthaus Weinländer, two-storey, plastered, mansard roof, 18th century

=== Population growth ===
Year	1910	1933	1939	1987	2005
Population	123	118	127	202	187

=== Coat of arms ===
Since 20 May 1948 Leonrod has had a coat of arms designed in 1940.

The heraldically stylized water castle and the small shield with a noble coat of arms recall the former estate of the barons of Leonrod with which the name of the village and its history are intertwined. The noble line were later elevated to imperial Franconian knights.

== Literature ==
- Johann Kaspar Bundschuh (1801), Geographisches statistisch-topographisches Lexikon von Franken : Band 3 (in German), Ulm: Stettinische Buchhandlung, col. 331
- Josef Kollar, ed. (1985), Markt Dietenhofen (in German), pp. 164–166
