= St. Jakob, Nuremberg =

Coordinates: 49°27′00″N 11°04′13″E

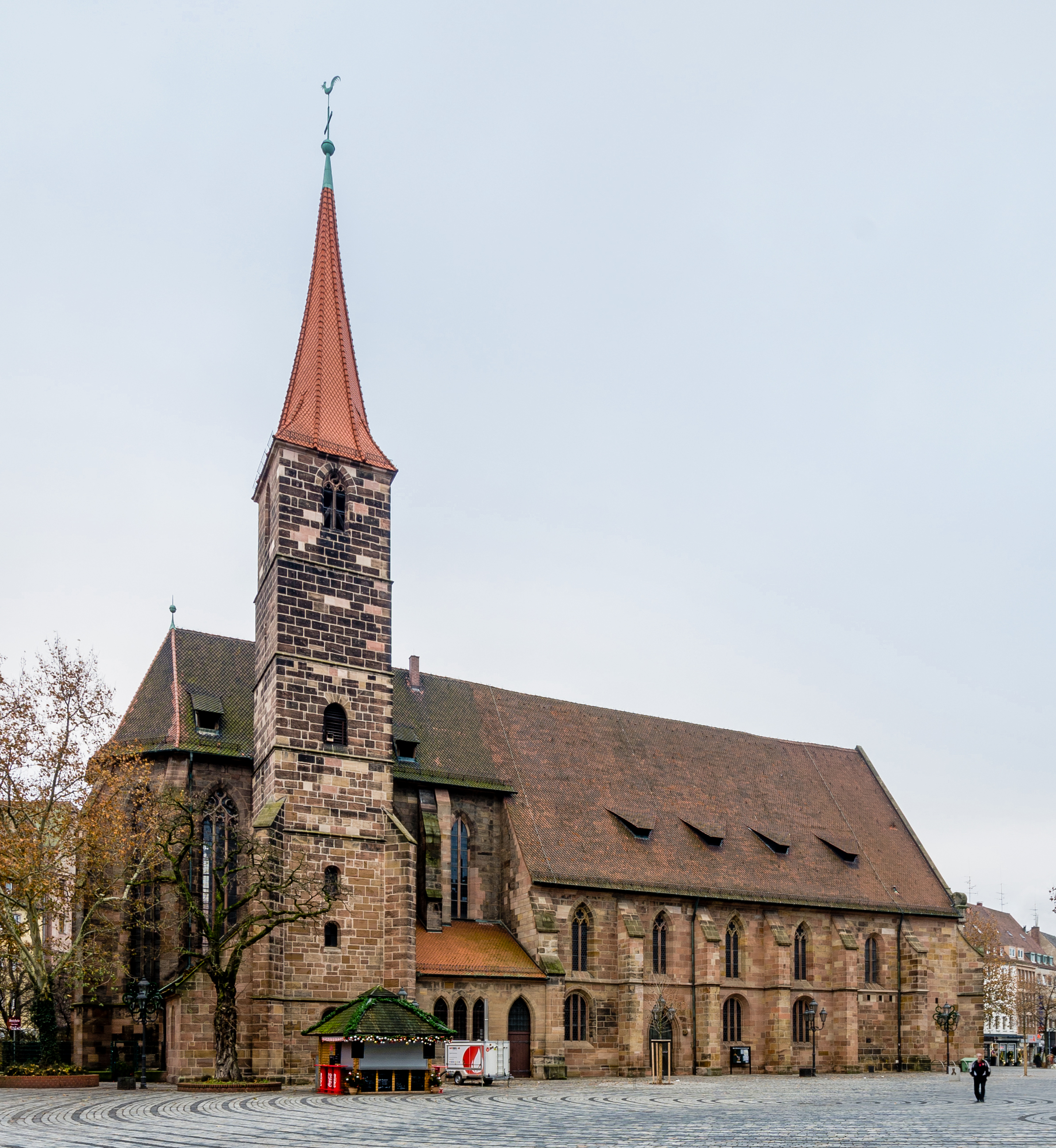
St Jakob, Nuremberg

St. Jakob (St James the Greater) is a medieval church of the former free imperial city of Nuremberg in southern Germany. It is dedicated to Saint James the Greater. The church was badly damaged during the Second World War and later restored.

== History ==
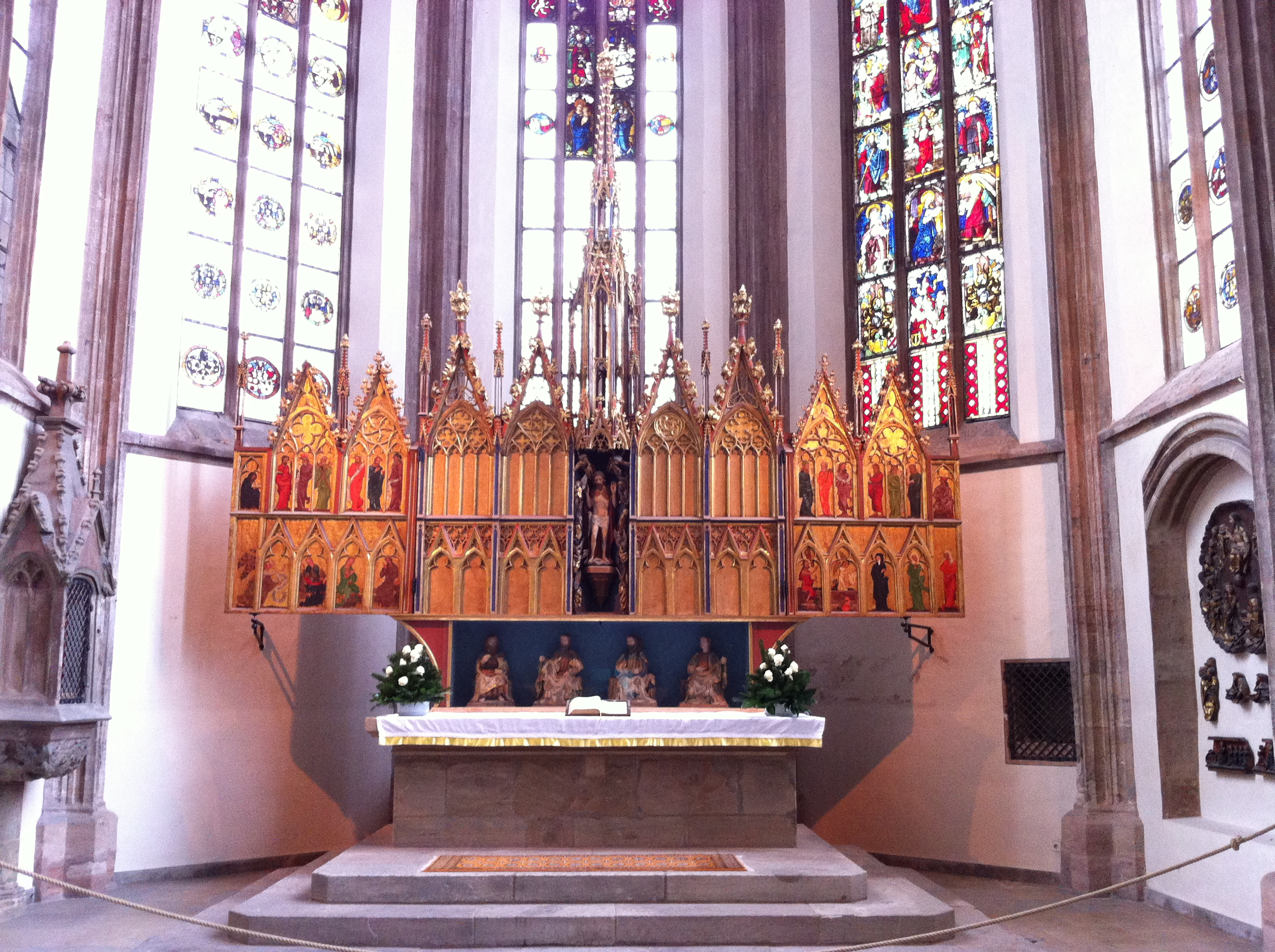
High altar in St Jakob, Nuremberg dating from 1360. When closed, the left hand panel shows the Nativity, and the right hand panel shows the Crucifixion

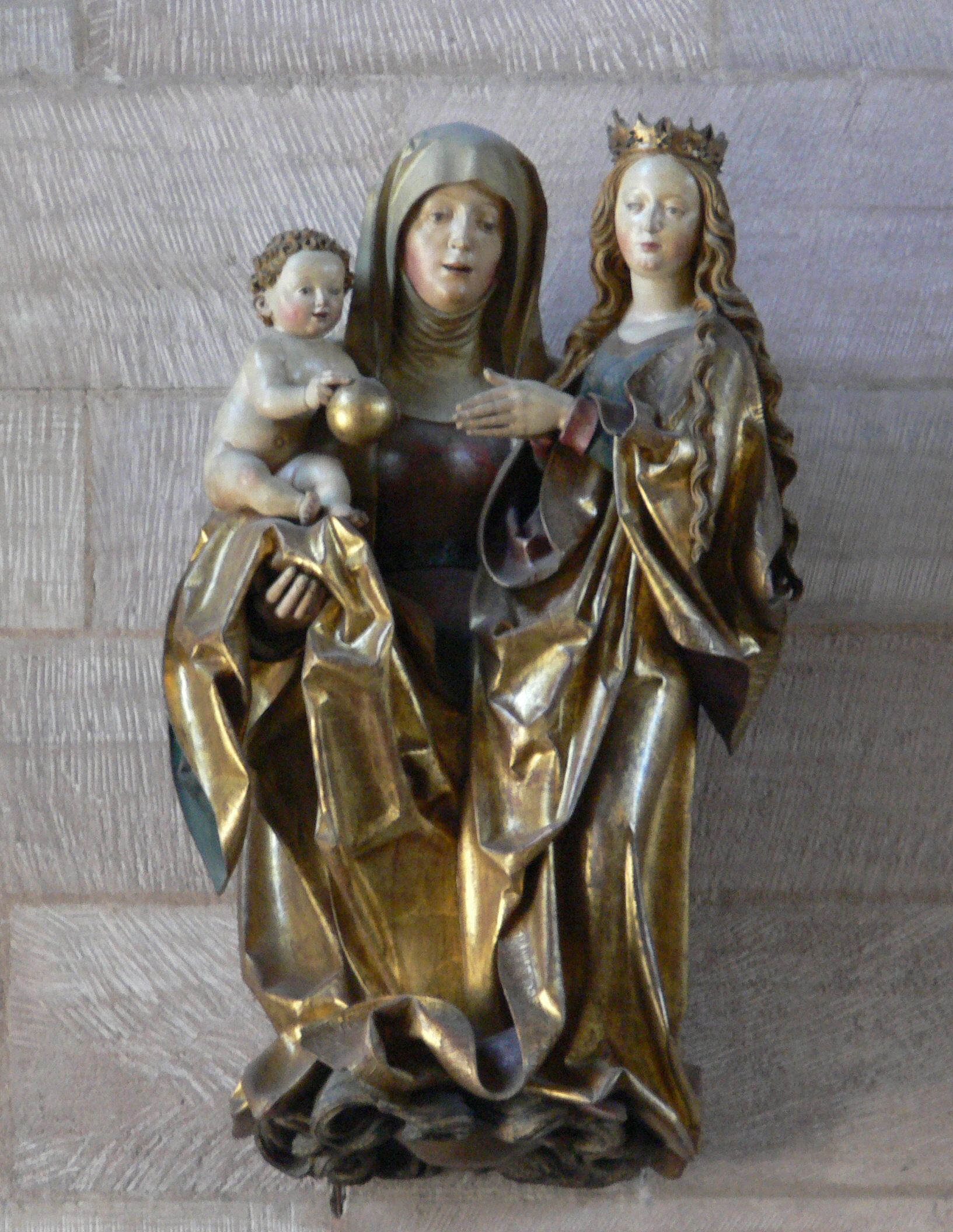
Virgin and Child with Saint Anne

The church was founded on 20 February 1209 by Otto IV, Holy Roman Emperor. The small Romanesque chapel was demolished about 80 years later and the church rebuilt. The church soon came into the possession of the Knights of St John. By Frederick II, the order was equipped with more and more possessions. The church still contains the reredos on the high altar which dates from 1360 to 1370.

During the Reformation, the Church of St. James was one of the Protestant Churches. In 1531 a preacher was intended, but the church remained in possession of the Catholic Teutonic Order.

In 1632 during the Thirty Years' War King Gustav Adolf expropriated the Teutonic Order, and handed the church to the city of Nuremberg and which carried out an extensive renovation. By the provisions of the Treaty of Westphalia returned to the Teutonic Order in 1648. The Order kept its hold until 1809, when Napoleon Bonaparte ordered its dissolution. In 1810 St. Jakob became the third Protestant parish church of Nuremberg.

== Organ ==
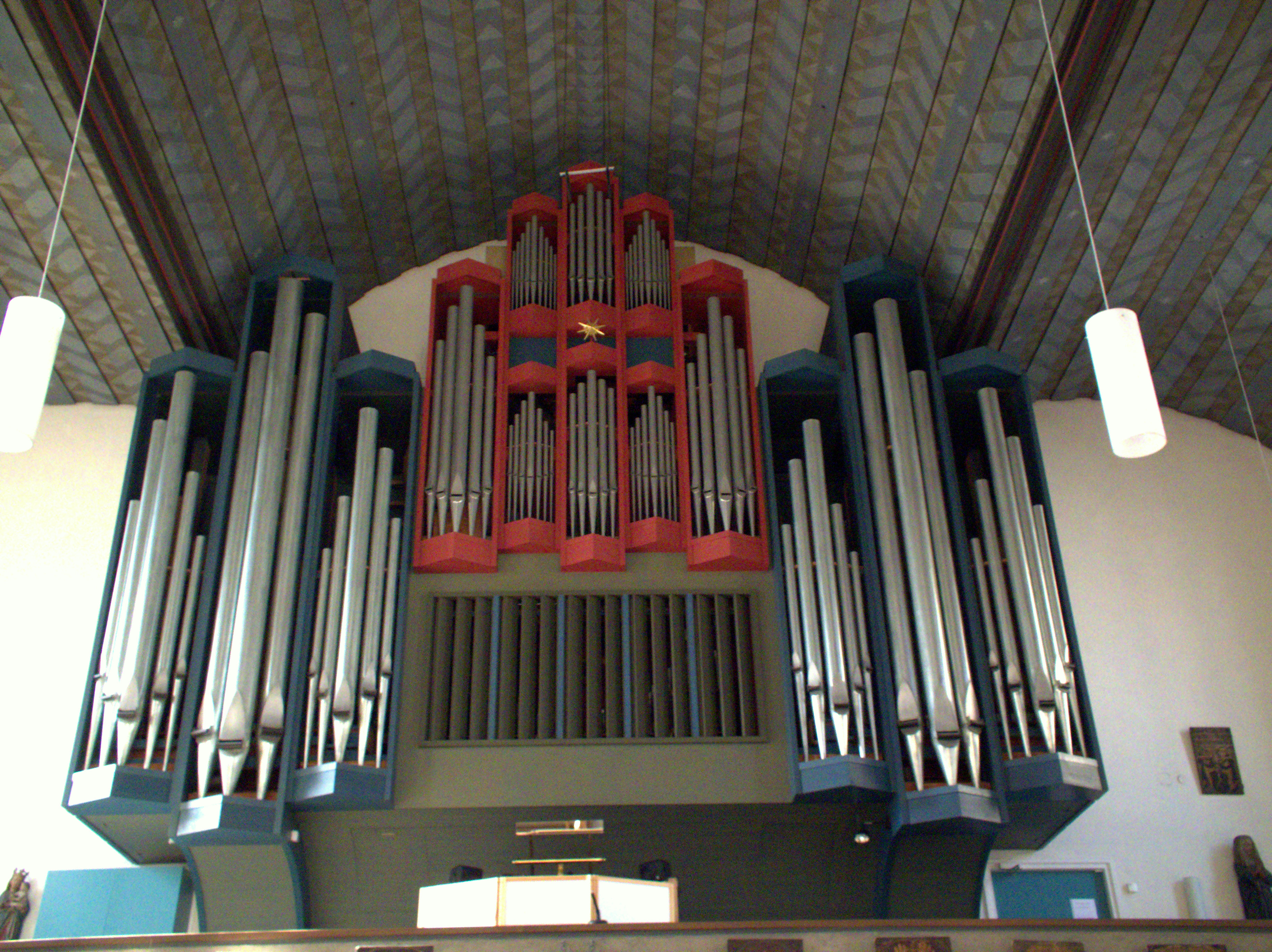
The Steinmeyer organ

The church contains a three manual pipe organ by Steinmeyer Orgelbau dating from 1968.

- Hauptwerk
- 1. Pommer 16'
- 2. Prinzipal 8'
- 3. Spitzflöte 8'
- 4. Oktave 4'
- 5. Kleingedackt 4'
- 6. Schwiegel 2'
- 7. Rauschquinte 2 fach 2^{2}/_{3}'+2'
- 8. Mixtur 4-6 fach 1^{1}/_{3}'
- 9. Trompete 8'
- Kronpositiv
- 10. Singend Gedackt 8'
- 11. Dulzflöte 8'
- 12. Praestant 4'
- 13. Koppelflöte 4'
- 14. Nasard 2^{2}/_{3}'
- 15. Oktave 2'
- 16. Quintlein 1^{1}/_{3}'
- 17. Terzmixtur 3 fach 1'
- 18. Zimbel 3 fach ^{2}/_{3}'
- Tremulant
- Brustwerk
- 19. Holzgedackt 8'
- 20. Gemshorn 8'
- 21. Harfenprinzipal 4'
- 22. Rohrflöte 4'
- 23. Prinzipal 2'
- 24. Blockflöte 1'
- 25. Kleinkornett 3 fach 2^{2}/_{3}'
- 26. Scharf 5 fach 1'
- 27. Musette 16'
- 28. Rohrschalmei 8'
- Tremulant
- Pedal
- 29. Prinzipalbaß 16'
- 30. Subbaß 16'
- 31. Zartbaß 16'
- 32. Oktavbaß 8'
- 33. Gedecktbaß 8'
- 34. Pommer 4'
- 35. Italienisch Prinzipal 2'
- 36. Choralbaß 3 fach 4'
- 37. Baßzink 3 fach 2^{2}/_{3}'
- 38. Posaune 16'
- 39. Trompete 8'

== Sources ==
- This page is based on the article on German Wikipedia.
