= Dietenhofen =

- Municipality
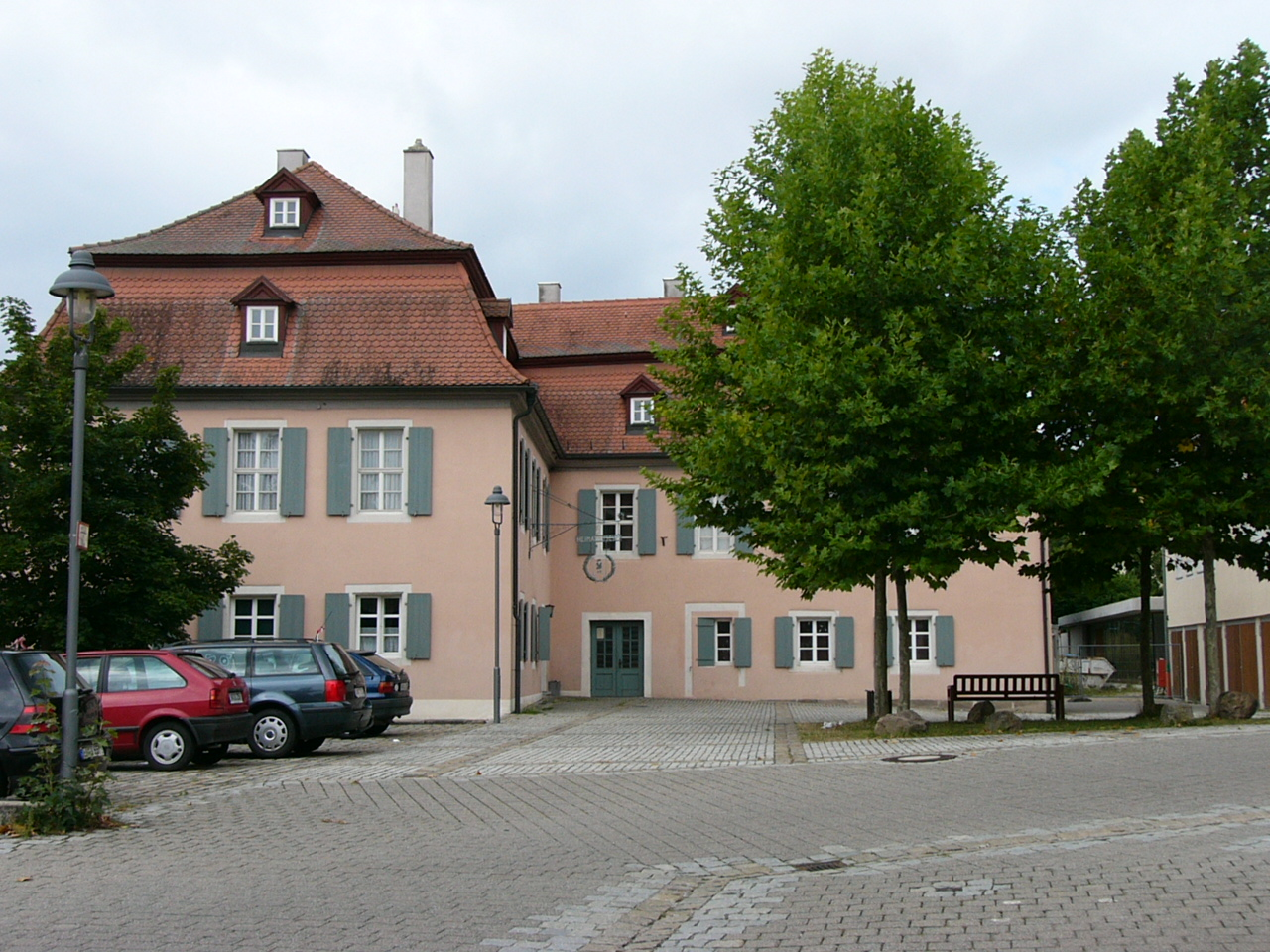
- Dietenhofen Palace, seat of the local history museum

- Coat of arms

- Location of Dietenhofen within Ansbach district
- Interactive map of Dietenhofen
- Location within Germany Location within Bavaria
- Coordinates: 49°24′10″N 10°41′10″E
- Country: Germany
- State: Bavaria
- Admin. region: Mittelfranken
- District: Ansbach

Government
  - Mayor (2020–26): Rainer Erdel

Area
  - Total: 63.93 km^{2} (24.68 sq mi)
- Elevation: 353 m (1,158 ft)

Population (2025-12-31)
  - Total: 5,776
  - Density: 90.35/km^{2} (234.0/sq mi)
- Time zone: UTC+01:00 (CET)
  - Summer (DST): UTC+02:00 (CEST)
- Postal codes: 90599
- Dialling codes: 09824
- Vehicle registration: AN
- Website: www.dietenhofen.de

Dietenhofen (German pronunciation: [diːtn̩ˈhoːfn̩]) is a municipality in the district of Ansbach in Bavaria, Germany.

== Geography ==
This small village is located in the Franconian Heights about 28 km west of Nuremberg, 14 km north east of Ansbach and 38 km east of Rothenburg o.d. Tauber.
The river Bibert flows through the valley community and gives its name to the Bibert walking and bicycle path. Apart from the main village, there are 27 subdivisions which also belong to Dietenhofen.

These are:

- Adelmannsdorf
- Andorf
- Dietenholz
- Ebersdorf
- Frickendorf
- Götteldorf
- Haunoldshofen
- Herpersdorf
- Höfen
- Hörleinsdorf
- Kehlmünz
- Kleinhabersdorf
- Kleinhaslach
- Lentersdorf
- Leonrod
- Methlach
- Moosmühle
- Münchzell
- Neudietenholz
- Neudorf
- Oberschlauersbach
- Rothleiten
- Rüdern
- Seubersdorf
- Stolzmühle
- Walburgswinden
- Warzfelden

== History ==
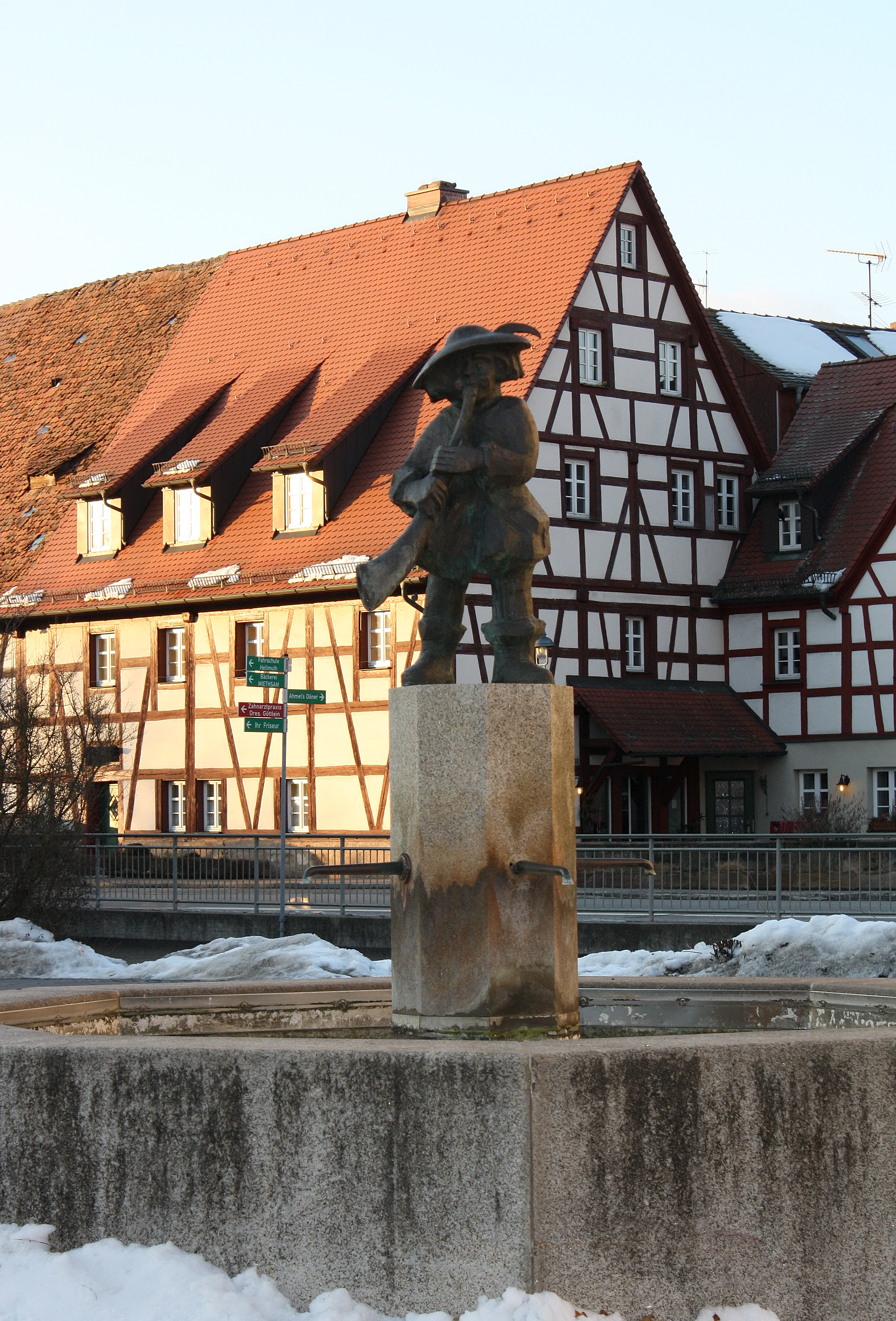
The Doodleman’s Fountain with a half-timbered house in the background

It’s a good idea to start the history of Dietenhofen with the legend behind its name.
Many years ago three noble maidens who had got lost in the area were saved by following the sound of a shepherd’s horn. They were so grateful that they had a chapel built where they met him, and called the place Dudenhofen. This later became “Dietenhofen”.
One of the most important monuments in Dietenhofen is the St. Andreas Church, which was built about 1000 AD. The church tower was added in the year 1468. There are some interesting old graves in the church and the magnificent old baroque altar is certainly worth seeing.
A few hundred metres away from the church you can find the local history museum which has also played an important role in Dietenhofen’s history. It was built in 1235 and was surrounded by a moat. It was home to Rüdiger von Dietenhofen. In 1523 the building was totally destroyed by fire. In 1822 it was rebuilt, bought by the local government and used as the village school.
The history would not be complete without mentioning the ruins in Leonrod (a nearby sleepy hamlet). The original building was constructed in 1218 and was also surrounded by a moat. It was home to the Baron of Leonrod and his family until it was accidentally burned down by their own servants in 1651.

Dietenhofen is mentioned in History of the Lombards by Paul the Deacon in AD 785, who also calls the place Villa Totonis.

== Economy ==
Dietenhofen enjoys a healthy economic situation and has as many jobs to offer, as it has inhabitants. The Dietenhofen firms Playmobil/Lechuza (Geobra Brandstätter GmbH), Herpa and Branofilter are global players.

== Politics ==
The local council includes 20 voluntary members.

Dietenhofen has two twin towns:

- Flavignac in France
- Zschorlau in Saxony/Germany

Exchanges take place regularly and lasting friendships have been established.

== Leisure and culture ==
Dietenhofen has a recently renovated indoor swimming pool and a sports hall. There are also some playing fields.
The numerous clubs and music groups on offer make sure that there is something for everybody. Cultural events take place regularly.

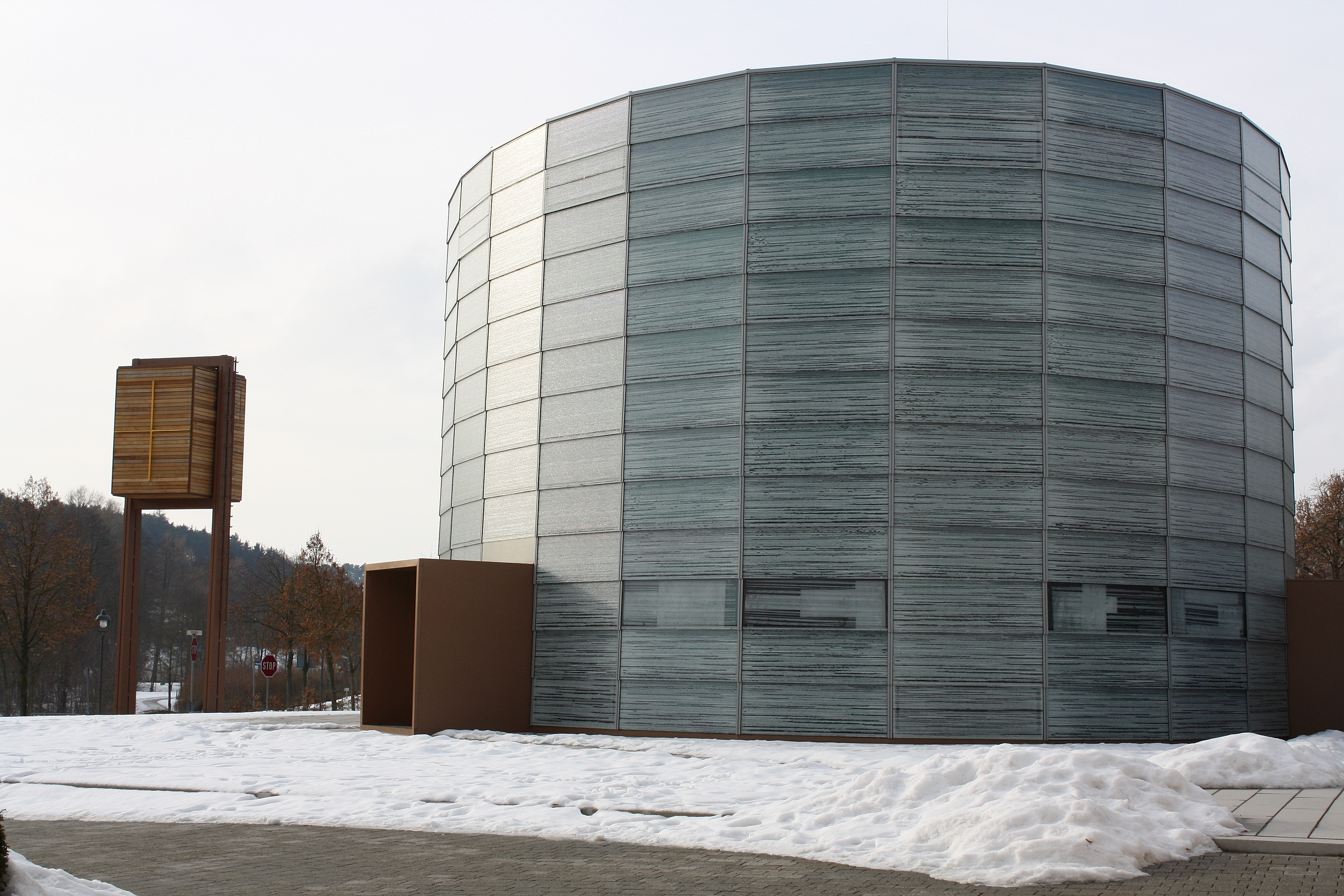
St. Boniface’s – the new Catholic church, consecrated Sept. 2009

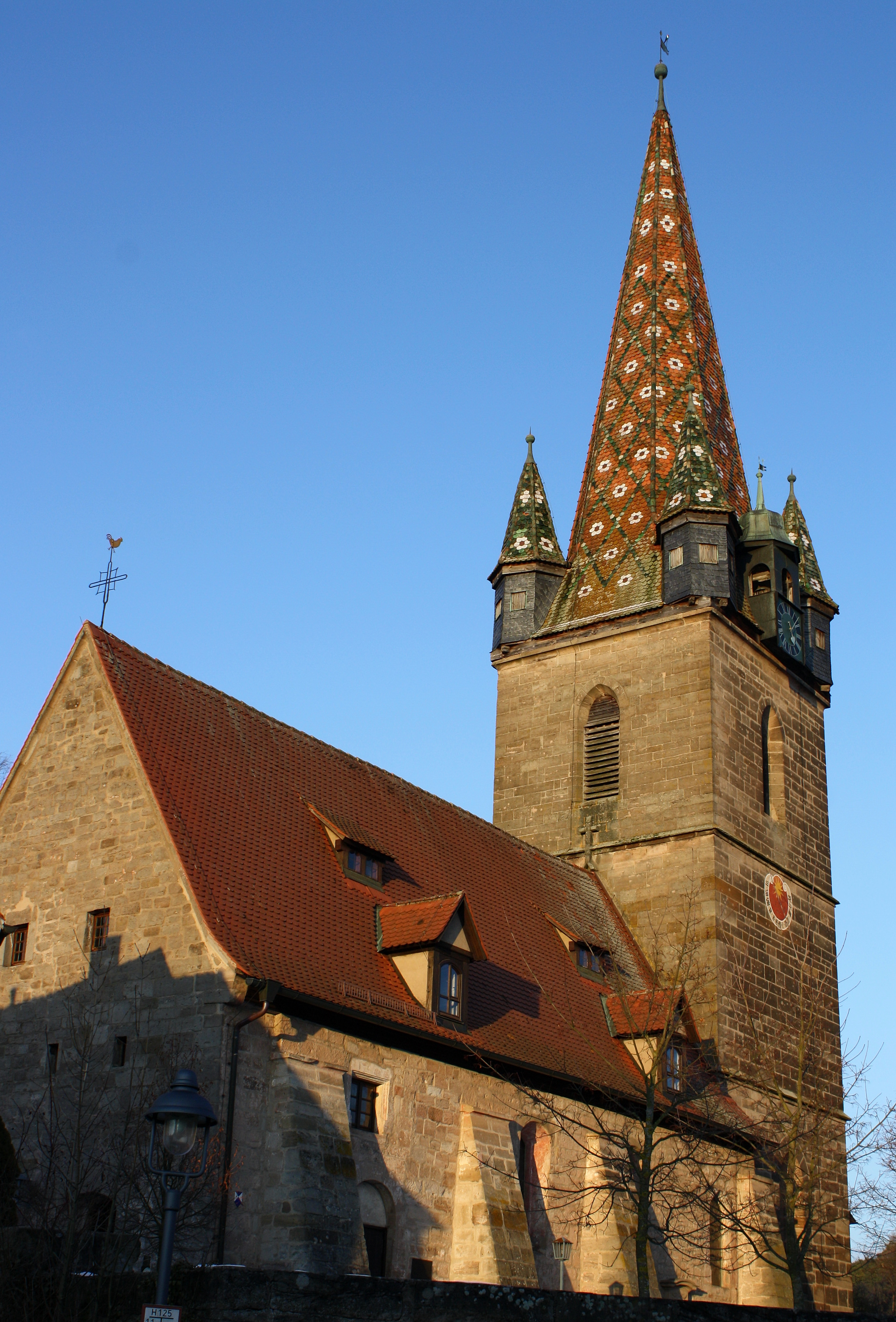
St. Andrews – the Protestant church
