= Bibert =

River in Germany

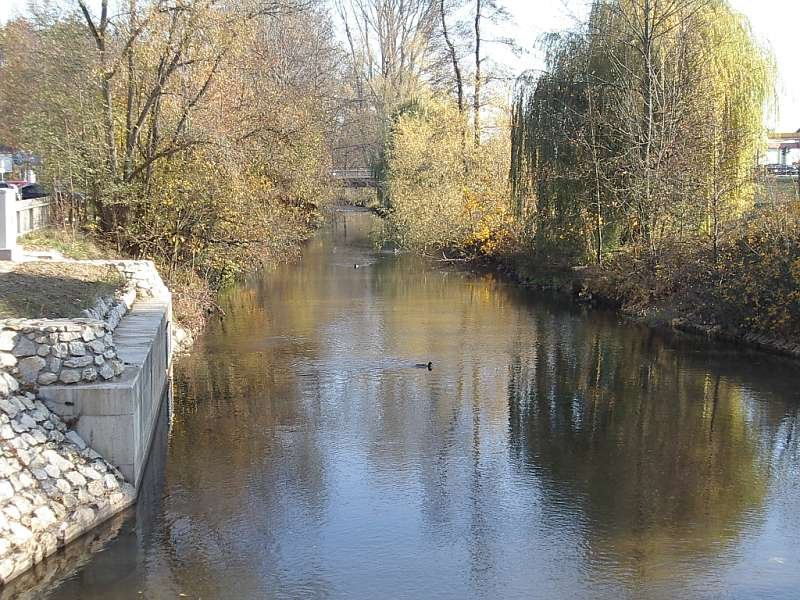
- The Bibert in Zirndorf

Location
- Country: Germany
- State: Bavaria

Physical characteristics
- Mouth
  - location: Rednitz
  - coordinates: 49.4452°N 10.9844°E
- Length: 42.3 km (26.3 mi)
- Basin size: 329 km^{2} (127 sq mi)

Basin features
- Progression: Rednitz→ Regnitz→ Main→ Rhine→ North Sea

Bibert is a river of Bavaria, Germany. It flows into the Rednitz near Fürth.

== See also ==
- List of rivers of Bavaria
