= Malaysian Aviation Commission =

Aviation regulatory body

Malaysian Aviation Commission (MAVCOM)
- Suruhanjaya Penerbangan Malaysia هيئة الطيران الماليزية
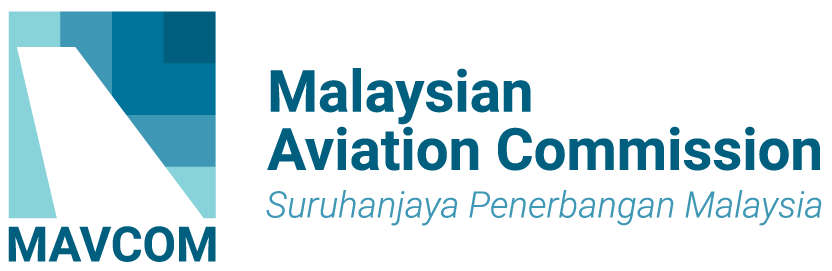
- {{{picture_caption}}}

Commission overview
- Formed: 1 March 2016; 10 years ago
- Dissolved: 1 August 2025; 12 months ago
- Superseding commission: Civil Aviation Authority of Malaysia
- Jurisdiction: Government of Malaysia
- Headquarters: Level 19, Menara 1 Sentrum, 201, Jalan Tun Sambanthan, 50470 Kuala Lumpur
- Minister responsible: Anthony Loke, Minister of Transport
- Deputy Minister responsible: Hasbi Habibollah, Deputy Minister of Transport
- Commission executives: Datuk Seri Hj. Saripuddin Hj. Kasim, Executive Chairman; Raja Azmi Raja Nazuddin, Chief Operating Officer
- Parent department: Ministry of Transport
- Key documents: Malaysian Aviation Commission Act 2015; Malaysian Aviation Commission (Dissolution) Act 2024
- Website: www.mavcom.my

The Malaysian Aviation Commission (Malay: Suruhanjaya Penerbangan Malaysia; Jawi: هيئة الطيران الماليزية; officially abbreviated as MAVCOM) was a regulatory body for the aviation industry in Malaysia under the Ministry of Transport, that was entrusted with overseeing the economic and consumer issues of the civil aviation sector in Malaysia. On 1 August 2025, MAVCOM and the Civil Aviation Authority of Malaysia (CAAM) was merged to establish a standalone aviation regulatory body, which saws its regulatory functions assumed by the CAAM.

== History ==
MAVCOM was established on 1 March 2016 under the Malaysian Aviation Commission Act 2015 (Act 771) to regulate economic and commercial matters related to the Malaysian civil aviation industry. Its key role is to promote a commercially viable, consumer-oriented and resilient civil aviation industry which supports the nation's economic growth. As an independent agency, MAVCOM's role is different from the Civil Aviation Authority of Malaysia (CAAM) and the Ministry of Transport.

In addition, MAVCOM enforces a protection code for air travellers in Malaysia by introduced the Malaysian Aviation Consumer Protection Code (MACPC) in July 2016. This code aims to protect and educate consumers of their travel rights and benefits while ensuring that airlines and airports are fully responsible and accountable for the quality of service it offered.

In June 2018, MAVCOM launches a smart app called FlySmart. The app was developed to made it easier for air traveller to lodge any enquiries and complaints on problems encountered in their flights. Two months later, it set up and spearheaded a one-stop centre called AeroFile. According to MAVCOM, the AeroFile was created to "efficiently reduce paperwork, increase transparency and shorten processing time while minimising the opportunity for human error".

On 9 September 2021, MAVCOM approved the merger of two South Korean airlines, Korean Air and Asiana Airlines to set up a new airline company in South Korea. The approval marks the first competition-related merger case to be analyzed by the commission and also the first in Malaysia.

MAVCOM launched an enhanced version of its airline and airport performance dashboard in May 2025. The dashboard intended to provide the "public and aviation stakeholders with improved access to transparent performance data across the nation's airlines and airports".The commission also planned to extend further the Airport Quality of Service (QoS) framework to Sultan Abdul Aziz Shah Airport and Penang International Airport, which expected to be implemented nationwide by 2027.

=== Merger with CAAM ===
In December 2019, the Ministry of Transport announced the merger of MAVCOM and CAAM to create a standalone aviation regulator. The proposed merger is said "to optimise staff and financials, as well as making the civil aviation industry more competitive" and will see the CAAM reabsorbing the commission's economic and commercial functions, in addition to its own technical and safety oversight activities. Though the merger was supposed to have been completed by the second quarter of 2021, however, the anticipated merger did not materialized as both MAVCOM and CAAM remains a separate entity.

The merger of both aviation bodies received negative feedbacks from aviation industry players, with the then-MAVCOM Executive Chairman Nungsari Ahmad Radhi disappointed with the MoT's decision to merge the commission with the CAAM, claiming that "such a decision was made with seeming disdain and without consultation" with them. Former Deputy Transport Minister, Aziz Kaprawi also objected the merger, saying that "it will remove checks and balances". Some parties also express their concerns on the merger with some them demanded that MAVCOM should remain independent, with the Consumers' Association of Penang (CAP) asked the MoT to retain the commission "to promote consumer interest".

In October 2023, Transport Minister, Anthony Loke announced that a bill for proposed merger between MAVCOM and CAAM will be tabled on the Parliament in 2024. On 13 June 2024, it was announced that the two bodies is expected to merge by 2025 with a merger date yet to be announced. Eleven days later, on 24 June, two new bills for the merger of MAVCOM and CAAM were tabled at the Parliament by the Deputy Transport Minister, Hasbi Habibollah and approved by the Dewan Rakyat two days later. The bills were subsequently passed by the Dewan Negara on 30 July. On 11 September, both bills were granted royal assent and were gazetted on 25 September. On 20 December, the tentative date for the merger of MAVCOM and CAAM has been finalized and will be announced later.

On 23 June 2025, Loke announced that the merger of MAVCOM and CAAM is expected to completed by 1 August, with MAVCOM's economic regulatory functions will be taken over by CAAM, which in turn to make the latter a sole aviation regulator in the country oversaws both economic and technical aspects and transitioned as an independent statutory body with separated remuneration and exempted by the Government. On 21 July, MAVCOM said that it will transferred its roles and functions to CAAM on the stipulated date while also stated that all of its consumer platrorms, including FlySmart app will remain operational after the merger completed.

On 1 August, the merger of MAVCOM and CAAM was officially completed. As a result of the move, all 57 of the commission's staffs were transferred to CAAM, matched to their skills and experience with MAVCOM.

== Act and functions ==
MAVCOM's functions are clearly defined by the MAVCOM Act 2015. As prescribed in the Act 771, among the functions of the commission include:

- Regulates economic matters related to civil aviation
- Providing mechanism for consumer protection
- Providing mechanism for dispute resolutions between aviation industry players
- Oversees and administers air traffic rights
- Advised the Government on economic issues
- Manages routes under public service obligations

== See also ==
- Civil Aviation Authority of Malaysia (CAAM)
- Malaysia National Aviation Policy
