= Road Safety Council of Malaysia =

Organisation responsible for road safety in Malaysia

- Majlis Keselamatan Jalan Raya Malaysia
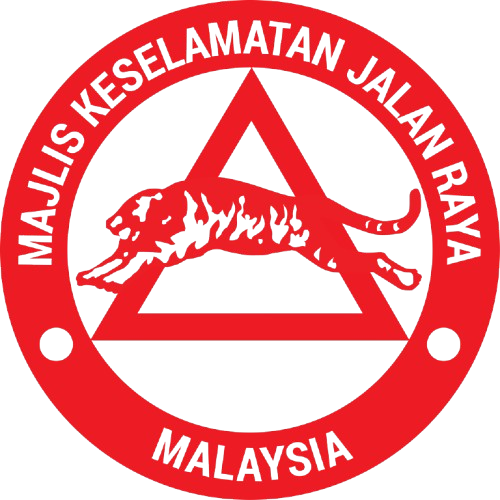
- Abbreviation: MKJR
- Formation: 1954; 72 years ago; July 9, 1963; 63 years ago (registered as NGO)
- Type: Non-governmental organization (original); Government Advisory Council
- Legal status: Active
- Headquarters: Aras 1, Galeria PjH, Jalan P4W, Persiaran Perdana, Precinct 4, Putrajaya, Malaysia
- Key people: Anthony Loke (Chairman, Minister of Transport); Anwar Ibrahim (Patron, Prime Minister of Malaysia)
- Main organ: National Council; State Councils
- Parent organization: Ministry of Transport
- Website: mkjr.my

The Road Safety Council of Malaysia (Malay: Majlis Keselamatan Jalan Raya Malaysia; abbreviated as MKJR) is the national advisory body on road safety in Malaysia under the Ministry of Transport, chaired by the Minister of Transport and patronised by the Prime Minister of Malaysia. Established in 1954 and registered as a non-governmental organisation (NGO) in 1963, it initially focused on public education and awareness campaigns. Its operational functions were later largely taken over by the Malaysian Road Safety Department, which acted as its secretariat, and the Malaysian Institute of Road Safety Research (MIROS). Following the absorption of JKJR into the Road Transport Department (JPJ) in 2020, MKJR continues to function primarily as a forum for road safety stakeholders and an advisor to the government, although concerns have been raised about its operational status and activity levels since 2019.

== History ==
MKJR was established in 1954 amid growing concerns about road safety in Malaysia. It was officially registered as an NGO on 9 July 1963, focusing on public education through large-scale national campaigns via radio, television, and print media from the 1960s onwards. A notable campaign slogan popularised by MKJR was "Pandu Cermat, Jiwa Selamat" (Drive Carefully, Save Lives).

The Road Safety Department (Jabatan Keselamatan Jalan Raya - JKJR) was established later, on 15 September 2004, as the lead agency for road safety advocacy. JKJR took over many of MKJR's public awareness and education functions and served as the secretariat for MKJR. The Malaysian Institute of Road Safety Research (MIROS) was established in 2007 as a dedicated body for road safety research.

This restructuring positioned MKJR primarily as an advisory council and stakeholder forum. Effective 1 May 2020, JKJR was dissolved as a separate department and its functions and staff were absorbed into the Road Transport Department (JPJ), under a new Road Safety Division (Bahagian Keselamatan Jalan Raya - BKJR).

State-level MKJRs have also existed, collaborating with state authorities and JKJR/JPJ on local campaigns and initiatives. However, the status and activity of these state councils have varied; for example, the Melaka state government dissolved its MKJR in 2018 before re-establishing it in 2023. The Johor state MKJR was also relaunched in 2017.

== Structure and role ==
MKJR functions as the national advisory council on road safety, chaired by the Minister of Transport and patronised by the Prime Minister. It serves as a platform for stakeholders involved in road safety. State-level MKJR bodies also exist and engage in local road safety advocacy and programmes, often in collaboration with JPJ and other agencies.

The operational aspects of national road safety advocacy, education, and intervention are primarily handled by the Road Safety Division (Bahagian Keselamatan Jalan Raya - BKJR) within JPJ, which absorbed the functions of the former JKJR. Key functions of BKJR include:

- Planning and coordinating road safety strategies.
- Implementing awareness campaigns (e.g., Tanpa Minggu Tanpa Advokasi - TMTA).
- Coordinating road safety education in the national school curriculum.
- Running intervention programs like the "My Safe Road Program" targeting high-risk districts.
- Engaging with NGOs, corporations, and other stakeholders.
- Formerly acting as the secretariat for MKJR (as JKJR).

== Recent developments and concerns ==
In 2024, concerns were publicly raised by road safety activists and figures linked to state MKJRs regarding the national MKJR's lack of activity, particularly the failure to hold an Annual General Meeting (AGM). This period of inactivity coincided with the absorption of its secretariat (JKJR) into JPJ in 2020.

Critics have argued that this situation has led to a lack of direction, waning enthusiasm among members, and questions over MKJR's legitimacy as a registered NGO due to the failure to hold AGMs. Calls were made in 2023 and 2024 for the Ministry of Transport and the Prime Minister to intervene, revitalize the council at national and state levels, and ensure better coordination between MKJR and JPJ's Road Safety Division to achieve the national road safety targets.

MKJR's official website states its continued focus on the Safe System Approach and supporting targeted safety initiatives aligned with the Malaysian Road Safety Plan 2022–2030. Key programmes include the "My Safe Road" district-level initiative, which uses data to address local accident blackspots and protect vulnerable road users, and the "Safe School Zone" project, which advocates for reduced speed limits and improved infrastructure around educational institutions. Furthermore, the council leverages its inter-ministerial structure to advocate for evidence-based national policies and operates the Road Safety Leadership Fellowship Programme to build long-term capacity among young leaders. The site also lists Anthony Loke and Hasbi Habibollah as its current Chairman and Deputy Chairman, respectively.

== See also ==
- Malaysian Institute of Road Safety Research (MIROS)
