= Malaysian Institute of Road Safety Research =

Malaysian research institute

- Institut Penyelidikan Keselamatan Jalan Raya Malaysia
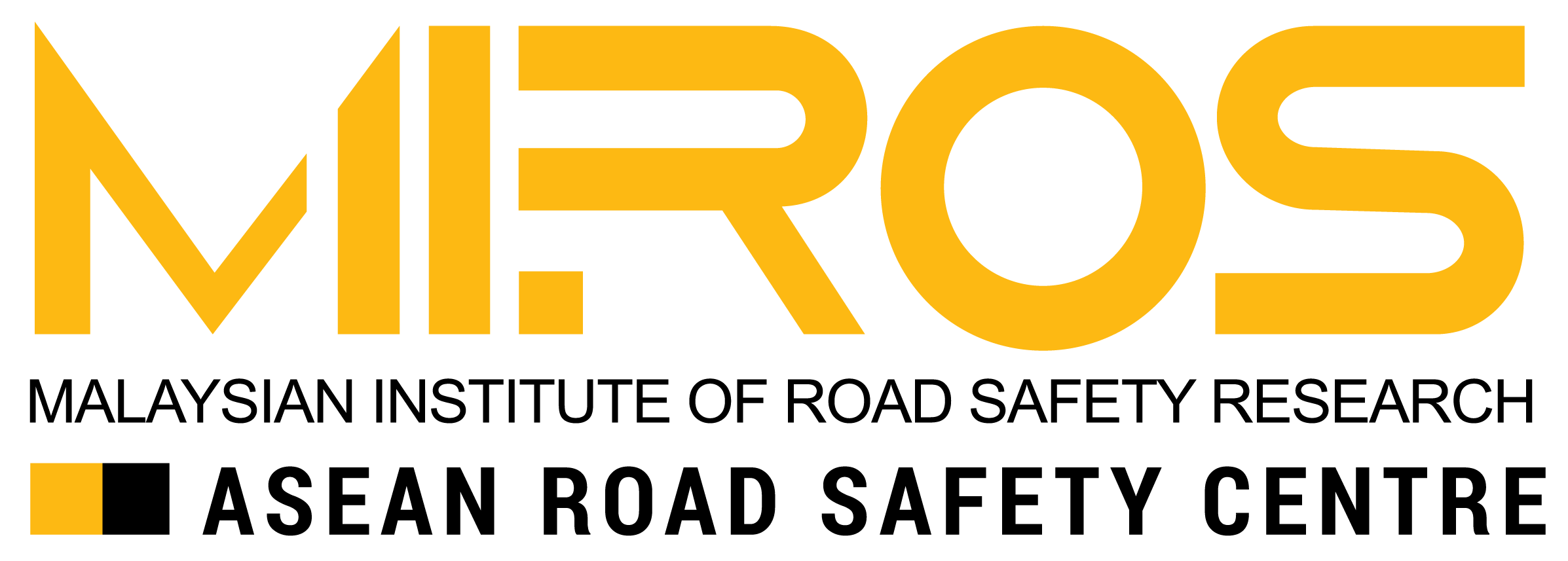

Agency overview
- Formed: 3 January 2007; 19 years ago
- Jurisdiction: Government of Malaysia
- Headquarters: 125-135, Jalan TKS 1, Taman Kajang Sentral, 43000 Kajang, Selangor
- Minister responsible: Anthony Loke Siew Fook, Minister of Transport
- Deputy Minister responsible: Hasbi Habibollah, Deputy Minister of Transport
- Agency executives: Profesor Dr. Wong Shaw Voon, Chairman; Profesor Madya Ts. Dr. Siti Zaharah Ishak, Director-General
- Parent agency: Ministry of Transport Malaysia
- Key document: Malaysian Institute of Road Safety Research Act 2012
- Website: www.miros.gov.my

The Malaysian Institute of Road Safety Research (Malay: Institut Penyelidikan Keselamatan Jalan Raya Malaysia; abbreviated as MIROS) is a government statutory body under the Ministry of Transport. Established in 2007, MIROS responsible for planning and conducting studies and assessments related to areas involving the road safety sector and functioned as a one-stop center for the collection and dissemination of information through printing and training programs.

== History ==
Before MIROS was set up, Malaysia has two road safety bodies — namely the Road Safety Council of Malaysia (MKJR) which was established in 1954 as an advisory body, and the Malaysian Road Safety Department (JKJR) which was set up in 2004 as a lead agency for road safety advocacy.

MIROS was established upon approval at the Cabinet Committee Meeting on Road Safety No. 1/2006 on 15 May 2006 which was chaired by the then fifth Prime Minister, Abdullah Ahmad Badawi. The idea for MIROS was first mooted in 1987 when the government intended to set up an agency focused on road safety research. It began operations on 3 January 2007 and receive RM50 million allocation to cut road deaths by half. The then-Deputy Vice Chancellor of Universiti Putra Malaysia, Radin Umar Radin Sohadi become its first Director-General.

In 2014, the ASEAN Transport Ministers appointed MIROS as the ASEAN Road Safety Centre. The centre aims to contribute and promote knowledge on road safety among ASEAN countries, including road laws, data management, standards development, education and road safety awareness.

== See also ==
- Road Safety Council of Malaysia (MKJR)
