= MYAirline =

Low-cost airline of Malaysia (2021–2023)

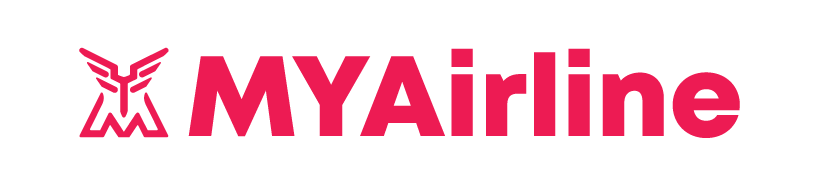

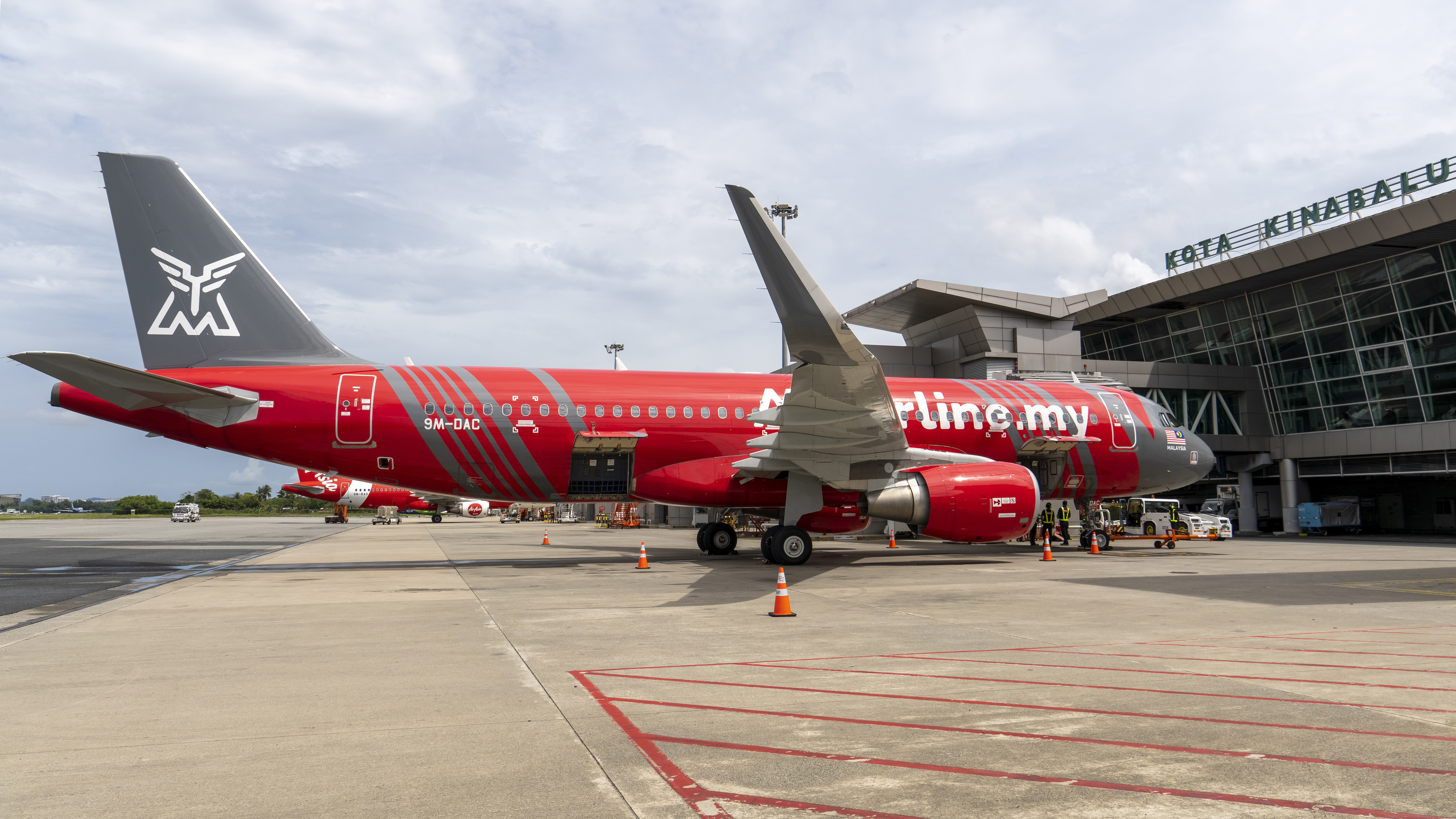
IATA	ICAO	Call sign
Z9	MYM	MYAIR
- Founded: 11 January 2021; 5 years ago
- Commenced operations: 1 December 2022; 3 years ago
- Ceased operations: 12 October 2023; 2 years ago
- AOC #: 68
- Operating bases: Kuala Lumpur–International; Kota Kinabalu
- Fleet size: 4
- Destinations: 9
- Parent company: Dato' (Allan) Goh Hwan Hua (98%, via Zillion Wealth Bhd. and Trillion Cove Holdings Bhd.)
- Headquarters: Subang Jaya, Selangor, Malaysia
- Key people: Vacant (CEO)
- Employees: 500
- Website: www.myairline.my

MYAirline was a short-lived Malaysian low-cost airline founded in 2021. It was headquartered in Subang Jaya, Selangor and primarily operated from KLIA2, the low-cost carrier terminal of Kuala Lumpur International Airport. The airline began its maiden flight on 1 December 2022 to Kuching International Airport. The company slogan was Your Experience Matters.

On 12 October 2023, the airline announced that it has permanently suspended operations effective immediately due to “severe financial challenges”.

== History ==
=== Origin ===
The airline traces its origin from a discussion between Rayner Teo Kheng Hock, an airline industry veteran, and a Malaysian entrepreneur, Dato' Goh Hwan Hua in late 2020. The team identified that the post-pandemic travel recovery would establish a good potential to build a new airline, including a lower price rate for aircraft leases, as well as the surplus of airport slots and skilled aviation-related professionals. MYAirline was founded on 11 January 2021; and on October 28, 2021, the company's legal name was changed to Z9 Elite Sdn. Bhd. and subsequently to MYAirline Sdn. Bhd.

In July 2022, the airline received its first aircraft, an Airbus A320 (9M-DAC) leased from Aircastle Limited. MYAirline's fleet was further developed by the arrival of its second (9M-DAB) and third aircraft (9M-DAG) in September and October 2022. The airline was granted its Air Operator Certificate on 27 September 2022 from the Civil Aviation Authority of Malaysia, as well as its Air Service License on 15 November 2022 from Malaysian Aviation Commission (MAVCOM). The license awarded enables MYAirline to operate passenger and cargo services.

The airline was initially rumoured to position itself as the nation's first ultra low cost carrier. However, on 5 October 2022, it was clarified by the airline's CEO, Rayner Teo that the carrier will perform as a low cost carrier.

=== Launch ===
The bookings for MYAirline was launched on 25 November 2022 and the scheduled flights for the carrier commenced on 1 December 2022. The carrier, with a fleet of three Airbus A320 operated its inaugural service from Kuala Lumpur International Airport to Kuching, Kota Kinabalu and Langkawi.

During its initial operations, the airline recorded a high passenger load factor, with routes to Kuching and Kota Kinabalu gained an above 80% load factor and about 70% for Langkawi. There are also some flights that captured 100% capacity, with an average of 75% load factor throughout its network. The carrier offered a once-daily flight to Kuching and twice flights per-day to Kota Kinabalu and Langkawi. By 2 December 2022, the flights to Kuching was increased to twice-daily. A third-daily flight was added to Kota Kinabalu and Kuching from 27 December 2022 onwards.

On 5 December 2022, MYAirline officially introduced routes to Kota Bharu, Penang and Sibu on its network. The flight was commenced on 10 December 2022 for Kota Bharu, followed by Penang by 23 December and 18 January 2023 for Sibu. The operations to Kota Bharu and Sibu are conducted on a twice-daily basis, while Penang has started on a single-daily flight, before being increased to twice flights per-day from 7 January 2023.

The company's domestic route development was continued on 16 December 2022, following MYAirline's announcement to inaugurate two new destinations to Tawau and Miri. The flights to Tawau has been commenced on 21 January 2023, with a single-daily basis; while the flights to Miri will began on 1 March 2023 with one flight per-day before being increased to twice-daily flight from 15 March 2023.

MYAirline's plan to serve Alor Setar and Terengganu will be initiated after the airline received the regulatory approvals. While its international expansion to Singapore, Thailand, Indonesia and Vietnam was originally planned to be operated by March 2023, has since being rescheduled to began by June 2023. The carrier is projected to fly on destinations located within a four-hour flight radius from its origin, optimum for the low-cost carrier operations.

On 5 January 2023, the airline welcomed its 100,000th passenger, as well as logging over 600 flights across its network. Both milestones were achieved about a month after its inauguration on 1 December 2022.

In April 2023, MyAirline introduced the Kota Kinabalu-Tawau flight on its network, becoming the first scheduled route in the company to be operated completely outside Kuala Lumpur International Airport. The month also witnessed additional frequencies from Kuala Lumpur to both Sabahan cities, with Kuala Lumpur-Kota Kinabalu flight being increased to four-daily operations and two-daily flights from Kuala Lumpur to Tawau. According to the MyAirline's CEO, Rayner Teo, the carrier has recorded more than half of its passengers flying towards East Malaysia and it is expected that the percentage will be increased within the next few months. As of 2023, both cities remains amongst the most important destinations in the company, with flights to Kota Kinabalu being its most profitable and followed by Tawau.

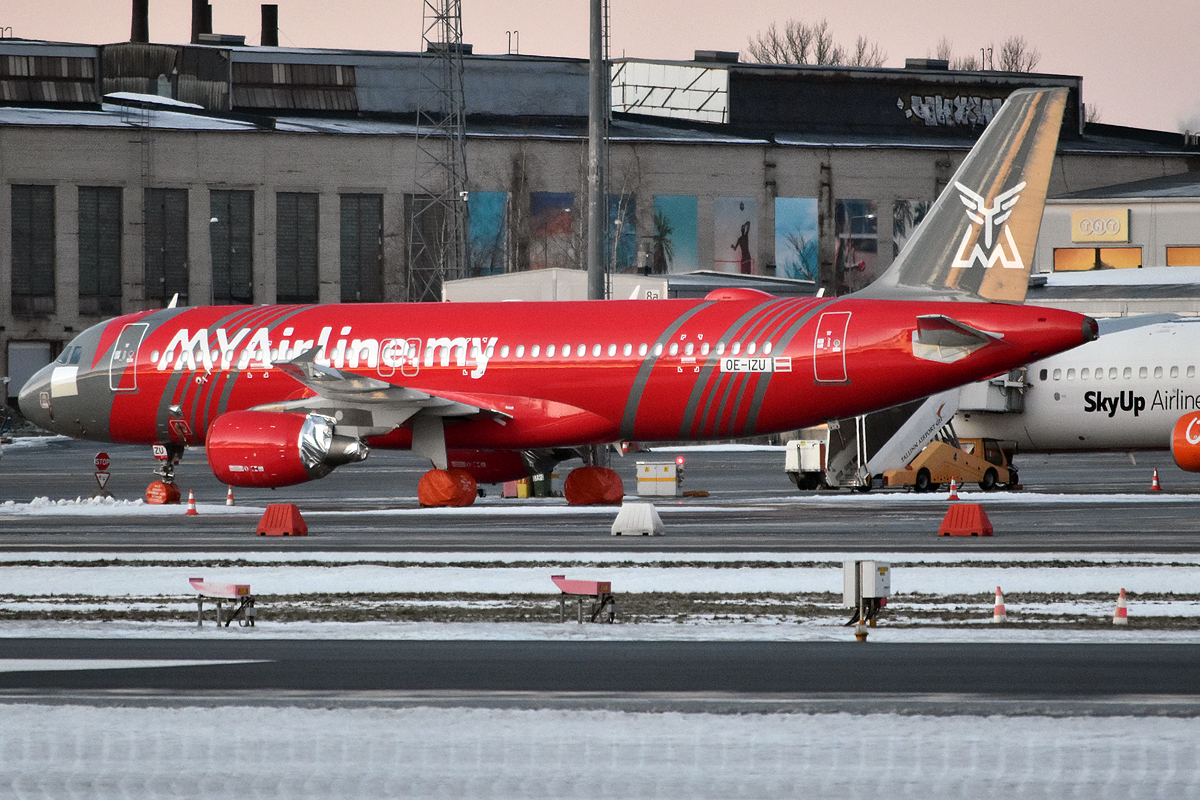
9M-DAL pre-handover to MYAirline

=== New hub and international expansion ===
MYAirline planned to make Kota Kinabalu International Airport as their second hub by the year-end of 2023. The carrier had also stated that it had conducted research to expand its route to include Sandakan and Bintulu in its network.

From May 2023, MYAirline has announced that it will launch cargo services. The operations is expected to be activated on all of its routes. The first overseas destination, Bangkok, Thailand was unveiled on May 8, 2023, the carrier will start flying to Bangkok on June 28, 2023, to Bangkok–Suvarnabhumi and followed by Bangkok–Don Mueang from 1 July 2023 onwards.

=== End of operations and the founders crisis ===
On 12 October 2023, MYAirline abruptly suspended operations citing financial issues pending shareholder restructuring and recapitalisation.

About 125,000 passengers, with tickets worth RM20mil, have been affected by MYAirline's sudden suspension. Following the announcement on Oct 16, Transport Minister Anthony Loke Siew Fook said the license of low-cost carrier MYAirline Sdn Bhd will be suspended temporarily. The Civil Aviation Authority of Malaysia (CAAM) has suspended MYAirline Sdn Bhd's air operator's certificate (AOC) effective Monday (Oct 16). Other local airlines including Malaysia Airlines, AirAsia, Batik Air Malaysia and Firefly have come to rescue the stranded passengers.

MYAirline co-founder Dato Allan Goh Hwan Hua has been arrested together with his wife, Datin Neow Ean Lee and their son, Sean Goh Tze Han in which they were remanded for four days to assist investigations under the Anti-Money Laundering, Anti-Terrorism Financing, and Proceeds of Unlawful Activities Act 2001. Remand for Dato Allan Goh Hwan Hua was extended for another 2 days on October 21. 15 investors have since filed suits against Dato Allan Goh Hwan Hua. One other suspect has also been arrested in connection with Dato Goh.

As of November 2023, the airlines employees have yet to be paid for their outstanding salaries and EPF contribution of nearly 2 months. The Social Security Organization (Perkeso) has far received multiple applications from its employees for assistance aid. Police reports have also been lodged in regards to delayed salaries.

On 31 October 2023, MYAirline released a statement which claimed that they would refund their affected passengers as soon as they received "recapitalization" from their investors. On 2 November 2023, the transport minister announced that affected passengers could request for their refunds by filing chargebacks with their respective banks or credit card providers. The Malaysian Aviation Commission confirmed that the Central Bank of Malaysia agreed that chargebacks were accepted for all affected flight tickets purchased through debit or credit cards, or by FPX bank payments. While the refund timeframe would depend upon the respective banks of the affected customers, some customers might have to wait up to 6 months to receive their refund.

=== Fleet dissolution and loss of operational license ===
In February 2024, reports surfaced indicating that MYAirline's final aircraft had been officially removed from registration, resulting in the airline having no aircraft in its fleet. The Civil Aviation Authority of Malaysia confirmed this absence of registered planes, stressing that a minimum of two aircraft is required for the airline to be recertified for operation.

In April 15, The Civil Aviation Authority of Malaysia has confirmed that the airline has missed its dateline in finding its investors to resume operation. As a result, the airline has lost its AOC and air service licence (ASL)

== Corporate affairs and identity ==
=== Headquarters ===
MYAirline established its headquarters in Subang Jaya, Selangor.

=== Ownership and structure ===
MYAirline was owned by Malaysian entrepreneur Dato. (Allan) Goh Hwan Hua, who controls a 98% stake in the airline via two private entities, Zillion Wealth Bhd. (88%) and Trillion Cove Holdings Bhd. (10%). Rayner Teo Kheng Hock, the founding CEO of MYAirline, holds the remaining 2%.

=== Branding ===
MYAirline introduced a red colour scheme with grey stripes progressed towards the aircraft's front fuselage, while its logo is painted on the vertical stabilizer. Initially, the company has experimented various other alternative colours, with the emphasis to avoid red, blue, orange and purple. However, it finally concluded that red is the most attractive palate to be donned on the aircraft.

== Destinations ==
Prior to suspending operations in October 2023, MYAirline's route system spanned a network mainly originating from its home base at Kuala Lumpur International Airport:

Country	City	Airport	Notes	Ref
Malaysia	Kota Bharu	Sultan Ismail Petra Airport		
Malaysia	Kota Kinabalu	Kota Kinabalu International Airport	[Planned] Base	
Malaysia	Kuala Lumpur	Kuala Lumpur International Airport	Base	
Malaysia	Kuching	Kuching International Airport		
Malaysia	Langkawi	Langkawi International Airport		
Malaysia	Miri	Miri Airport	Terminated	
Malaysia	Penang	Penang International Airport		
Malaysia	Sibu	Sibu Airport	Terminated	
Malaysia	Tawau	Tawau Airport		
Thailand	Bangkok	Don Mueang International Airport		
Thailand	Bangkok	Suvarnabhumi Airport		

== Fleet ==
=== Last fleet ===
As of October 2023, at the time of its closure, MYAirline operated 9 aircraft, all of which have since been deregistered by February 2024:.

Aircraft	In service	Orders	Passengers	Notes
Airbus A320-200	9	13	180	
Total	9	13		

=== Fleet development ===
MYAirline operated an all Airbus A320 fleet. The carrier affirmed that the usage of a single-type of narrow-body aircraft is suitable to accommodate their low-cost airline module. It was held that by handling a common fleet, the crew would develop an expertise on the type of aircraft. Thus, resulting a lower turnaround time, as well as a high utilization rate and a low unit cost. At present, its aircraft are leased from several sources, including Aircastle Limited and Genesis Lease. By the end of 2023, the airline projected to have 20 aircraft in its fleet network, and within the next 2 years, the number was expected to rise for a total of 50 aircraft, and 80 aircraft by 2027. However, on October 12, 2023, the airline went bankrupt with nine of its aircraft facing returning to lessor due to unpaid payments.

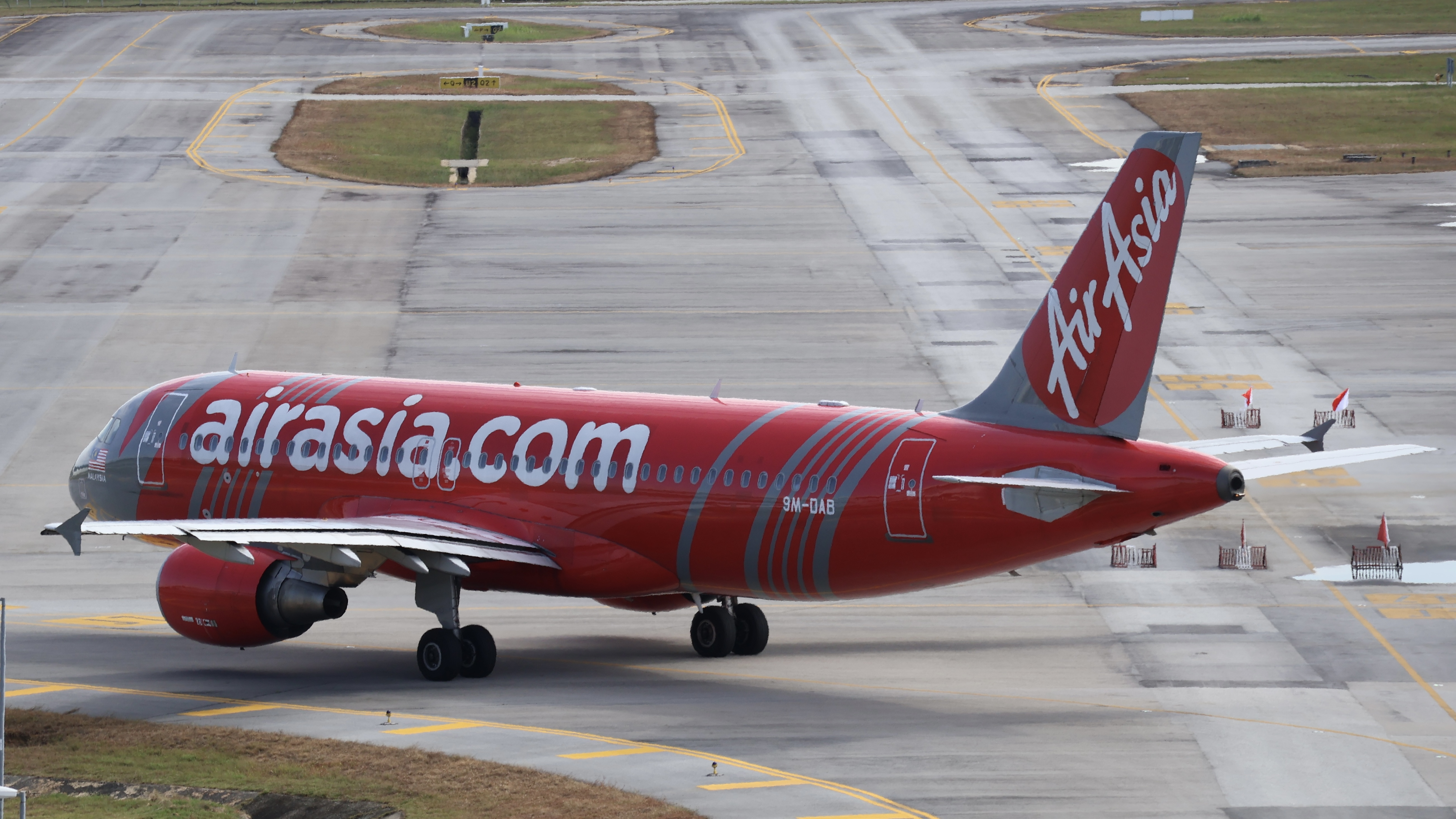
AirAsia Airbus A320-200 in MYairline livery following the suspension

On November 6, 2023, The airline has clarified that it still has four aircraft in its fleet with three others being handed back to its lessors and 4 others were transferred to AirAsia. There is no indication if the current 4 can be maintained further as funding still remains an issue with the airline.

In February 2024, The Civil Aviation Authority of Malaysia have confirmed that the airline no longer possess any aircraft in its fleet with the last aircraft de-registered on February 6.
