= Civil Aviation Authority of Malaysia =

Malaysian government agency

Civil Aviation Authority of Malaysia (CAAM)
- Pihak Berkuasa Penerbangan Awam Malaysia ڤيهق بركواس ڤنربڠن عوام مليسيا

Agency overview
- Formed: 1969; 57 years ago
- Preceding agency: Department of Civil Aviation (DCA)
- Jurisdiction: Government of Malaysia
- Headquarters: Putrajaya, Malaysia
- Minister responsible: Anthony Loke Siew Fook, Minister of Transport
- Deputy Minister responsible: Hasbi Habibollah, Deputy Minister of Transport
- Agency executives: Datuk Mohd Sharil Tarmizi, Chairman; Captain Norazman Mahmud, Chief Executive Officer
- Parent department: Ministry of Transport
- Child agency: Malaysian Aviation Academy (MAvA)
- Key documents: Civil Aviation Authority of Malaysia Act 2017; Civil Aviation Act 1969
- Website: www.caam.gov.my

The Civil Aviation Authority of Malaysia (CAAM, Malay: Pihak Berkuasa Penerbangan Awam Malaysia; Jawi: ڤيهق بركواس ڤنربڠن عوام مليسيا), previously known as the Department of Civil Aviation (DCA, Malay: Jabatan Penerbangan Awam), is a Malaysian government agency under the Ministry of Transport Malaysia. Established in 1969, it entrusted to oversees the technical issues related to the civil aviation sector in Malaysia. On 19 February 2018, DCA was incorporated into a statutory body and renamed as CAAM. On 1 August 2025, CAAM and the Malaysian Aviation Commission (MAVCOM) was merged to establish a standalone aviation regulatory body, which saws CAAM will assumed regulatory functions the latter previously carried out.

== Background ==
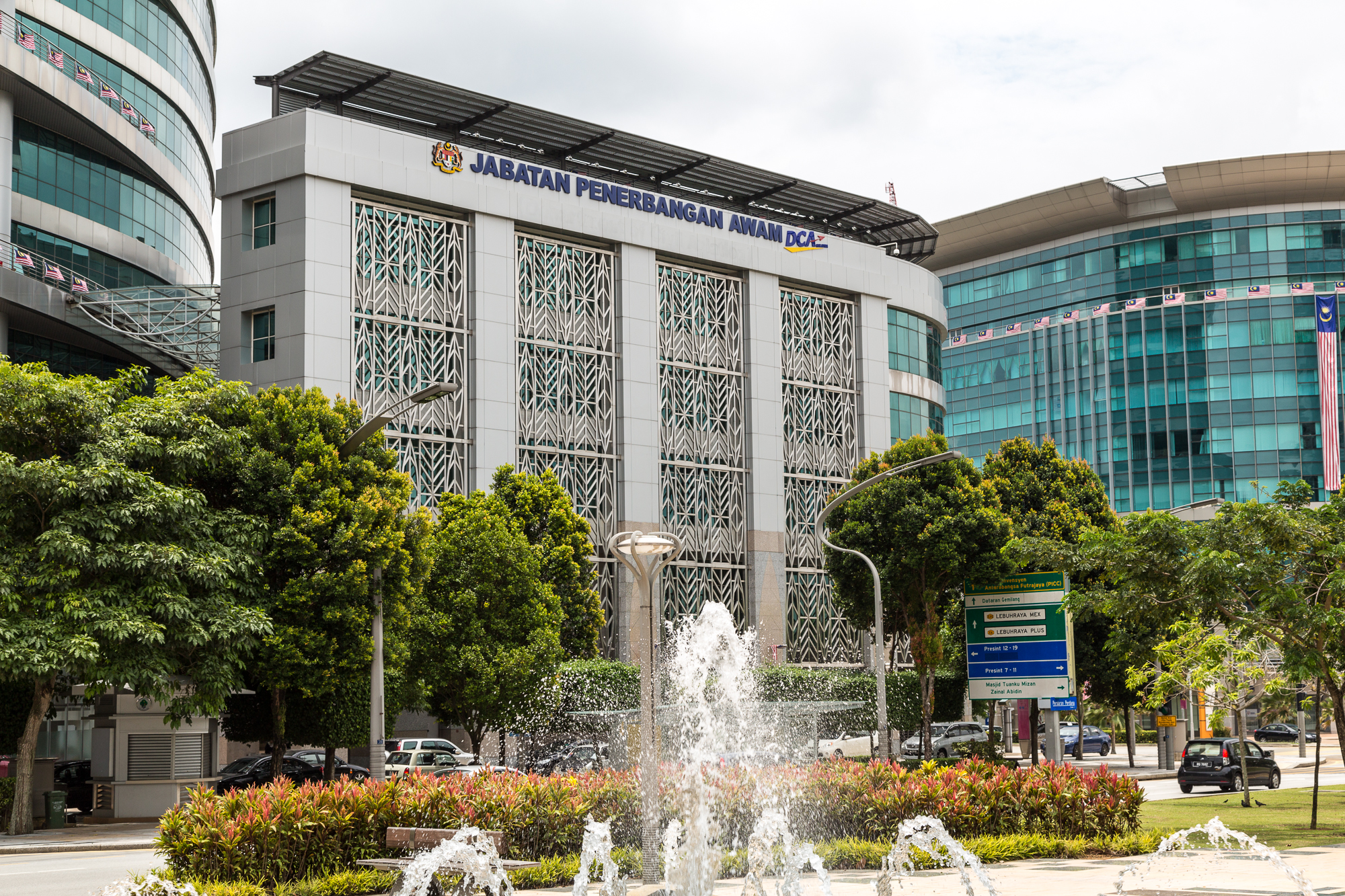
CAAM headquarters in Putrajaya.

The incorporation of CAAM is in line with requirements of the International Civil Aviation Organization (ICAO). Under this new agency, CAAM is making great strides to strengthen the nation's aviation standards as well as addressing existing challenges, to advance Malaysia in the aviation sector in line with the country's aspiration to be the leading hub for the industry regionally as well as globally.

The regulatory responsibility of civil aviation technical matters is vested in CAAM. Its main role is to contribute to the development of Malaysia's civil aviation technical sector and mandated to comply with ICAO's standards so as to keep aviation safe, secure and efficient. Malaysia is a proud Council member of ICAO from 2007 and has since maintained its membership in the Council for three consecutive terms while making significant contributions to the development of civil aviation's safety and security.

== History ==
The Department of Civil Aviation (DCA) was established in 1969 under the Civil Aviation Act 1969 [Act 3] to administer and regulate the civil aviation industry as well as to provide systematic air control services to airplanes. In 1976, the DCA became the self-accounting department under the Ministry of Transport.

In November 1992, the department is separated into two entities, namely the DCA and the Malaysia Airports Holdings Berhad (MAHB). The DCA remains the regulatory body for the airports and aviation industry in Malaysia, whilst the newly-established Malaysia Airports to focus on the operation, management, and maintenance of airports.

By 2001, the department moved its corporate headquarters from Wisma Semantan, Kuala Lumpur to Putrajaya.

In November 2016, the DCA became a statutory body and was renamed as the Civil Aviation Authority of Malaysia (CAAM), through the enactment of the Civil Aviation Authority of Malaysia Bill 2016. The transformation into a statutory body and rebranding from DCA to CAAM took effective 19 February 2018, in line with the Government's goal to spur the Malaysian aviation industry to a greater heights.

In October 2022, the authority reinstated as a Category 1 safety and technical regulator by the United States Federal Aviation Administration (FAA). The reinstatement will strengthen Malaysia's position as an aviation hub and improve its network connectivity.

=== Merger with MAVCOM ===
In December 2019, the Ministry of Transport announced that CAAM and the Malaysian Aviation Commission (MAVCOM) would merge to create a standalone aviation regulator. The proposed merger was said "to optimise staff and financials, as well as making the civil aviation industry more competitive". Though the merger was supposed to have been completed by the second quarter of 2021, however, the anticipated merger did not materialized as CAAM and MAVCOM remains a separate entities.

In October 2023, Transport Minister, Anthony Loke announced that a bill for proposed merger between CAAM and MAVCOM will be tabled on the Parliament in 2024. On 13 June 2024, it was announced that the two bodies is expected to merge by 2025 with an official merger date yet to be announced. Eleven days later, on 24 June, two new bills for the merger of CAAM and MAVCOM were tabled at the Parliament by the Deputy Transport Minister, Hasbi Habibollah and approved by the Dewan Rakyat two days later. On 11 September, both bills were granted royal assent and were gazetted on 25 September. On 20 December, the tentative date for the merger of CAAM and MAVCOM has been finalized and will be announced later.

On 23 June 2025, Loke announced that the merger of CAAM and MAVCOM is expected to completed by 1 August, with CAAM took over the MAVCOM's economic regulatory functions. The merger will make the CAAM a sole aviation regulator in the country oversaws both economic and technical aspects and transitioned as an independent statutory body with separated remuneration and exempted by the Government. On 21 July, MAVCOM said that CAAM will assumed the technical regulatory functions that the commission had previously carried out and also assumed other functions, including licensing and airport development.

On 1 August, the merger of CAAM and MAVCOM was officially completed. Following the move, Shahril Tarmizi is appointed as the new Chairman of the newly-combined entity. To coincide with its merger with MAVCOM, CAAM launched a new logo on 16 September, which reflects its refreshed brand image and a renewed corporate structure. The rebranding of CAAM also comes with its new slogan, "Safer Above. Safer Beyond".

== Divisions ==
- CAAM consists of the following divisions:
  - Quality and Standards
  - Flight Operations
  - Aviation Security
  - Airworthiness
  - Air Navigation Services & Aerodrome
  - Air Navigation Services Operations
  - Air Navigation Services Technical
  - Air Navigation Services Safety
  - Air Navigation Services Training
  - Malaysia Aviation Academy
  - CAAM Regional Office
    - Peninsular
    - Sabah
    - Sarawak
  - Management Services
  - Finance Management
  - Legal Advisor
  - State Safety Program Unit
  - Integrity Unit
  - Internal Audit & Compliance Unit
  - Corporate Communication Unit
  - Transformation Unit

== See also ==
- List of civil aviation authorities
- Malaysia Airports
- Malaysian Aviation Commission (MAVCOM)
- Malaysia National Aviation Policy
