= Road Transport Department (Malaysia) =

Government department under the Ministry of Transport

Road Transport Department Malaysia
- Jabatan Pengangkutan Jalan Malaysia (JPJ)
- Crest of the Malaysian Road Transport Department

Agency overview
- Formed: 1 April 1946; 80 years ago
- Jurisdiction: Government of Malaysia
- Headquarters: No. 26, Level 3-4, Federal Government Administrative Centre, Jalan Tun Hussein, Persiaran Perdana, Presint 4, 62100 Putrajaya, Malaysia.
- Motto: Digitalisation Towards Integrity (Digitalisasi ke Arah Integriti) (2019)
- Minister responsible: Anthony Loke, Minister of Transport
- Deputy Minister responsible: Hasbi Habibollah, Deputy Minister of Transport
- Agency executive: Aedy Fadly bin Ramli, Director General
- Parent department: Ministry of Transport
- Key document: Road Transport Act 1987 (Act 333)
- Website: www.jpj.gov.my

The Road Transport Department (Malay: Jabatan Pengangkutan Jalan, abbreviated JPJ), is a government department under the Malaysian Ministry of Transport. This department is responsible for registration of vehicles in Malaysia and issuing driving licence and vehicle number plates. Its headquarters is located in Level 3-4, No. 26, Presinct 4, Federal Government Administrative Centre, Putrajaya.

The department is charged with the responsibility of undertaking registration and licensing of drivers and all motor vehicles in Malaysia. According to the Road Transport Act 1987 (Act 333), the enforcement and regulatory duties are under the roles and responsibilities of JPJ/RTD.

As of 2024, the current director general of the department is Aedy Fadly bin Ramli.

== History ==
The Road Transport Department was founded in 1937. The department (named the Road Transport Board at the time) was founded from the Traffic Enactment 1937 of the British military law in the Federated Malay States. After the establishment of the Malayan Union, the board was handed to the Office of the Registrar and Inspection of Motor Cars and extended towards the Unfederated Malay States. The Road Transport Department was established on 1 April 1946. It was then standardized with the introduction of the Road Traffic Ordinance 1958 and the Road Transport Act 1987.

== Senior Management & State directors ==
Rank	Name
Director General; JUSA B	Aedy Fadly Bin Ramli
Deputy Director General (Planning & Operation); JUSA C	
Deputy Director General (Management) (JUSA C)	Ibrahim bin Mohd Yusof

State/Territory	Name	Grade
FT Kuala Lumpur	Mohd. Zaki Bin Ismail	PTD M52
Selangor	Azrin Bin Borhan	PTD M52
Sabah	Mohd Harris Bin Ali	PTD M52
Johor	Zulkarnain bin Yasin	
Sarawak	Norizan Bin Jili	PTD M52
Penang	Zulkifly Bin Ismail	KP52
Perak	Mohammad Yusoff Bin Abustan	PTD M52
Kedah	Stien Van Lutam	PTD M52
Perlis	Fatimah Bt Mohamed Ali Piah	PTD M52
Malacca	Muhammad Firdaus Bin Sharif	PTD M52
Negeri Sembilan	Hanif Yusabra Bin Yusuf	PTD M52
Kelantan	Mohd Misuari Bin Abdullah	PTD M52
FT Labuan		
Pahang	Kamarul Iskandar Bin Nordin	PTD M52
Terengganu	Zamri Bin Sameon	KP52

== KEJARA system ==
The Demerit Points System or Sistem Merit Kesalahan Jalan Raya (KEJARA) is a road offenders demerit point system. The system was introduced in 15 April 2017 with the approval of the parliement. In 2020, several offenses including driving under the influence were removed. These offenses have to be taken to court and decide by the Magistrates Courts.

=== Main purpose ===
- To reduce road accidents
- To take action against traffic offenders

== Recognition ==
In 2025, JPJ received the Malaysia Digital Transformation of the Year at the GovMedia Conference & Awards in the Transportation category for MYJPJ, an app allowing users to manage their driver's license, summons, and road tax.

For their 75th year anniversary, coins were minted to commemarate the department in 2021.

== Controversies ==
In 2019, 24 individuals and JPJ officials were arrested by the Malaysian Anti-Corruption Commission (MACC) for bribery.

In March of 2026, four individuals from JPJ and four others from the Traffic Investigation and Enforcement Department (Jabatan Siasatan dan Penguatkuasaan Trafik) were also arrested for bribes amounting to RM12 million.

== In popular culture ==
=== TV Series ===
- Skuad JPJ (RTD Squad), Malay drama created and produced by Machelister Production featured in RTM.
- Din Sardin OPS Cinta, Malay comedy drama and staring by Izzue Islam and Mira Filzah in 2017 on TV9.

=== TV Program ===
•999

== See also ==
- Driving licence in Malaysia
- Vehicle registration plates of Malaysia
- Puspakom
- Road signs in Malaysia
- Transport in Malaysia
