= MyDigital ID =

Malaysian government digital identity platform

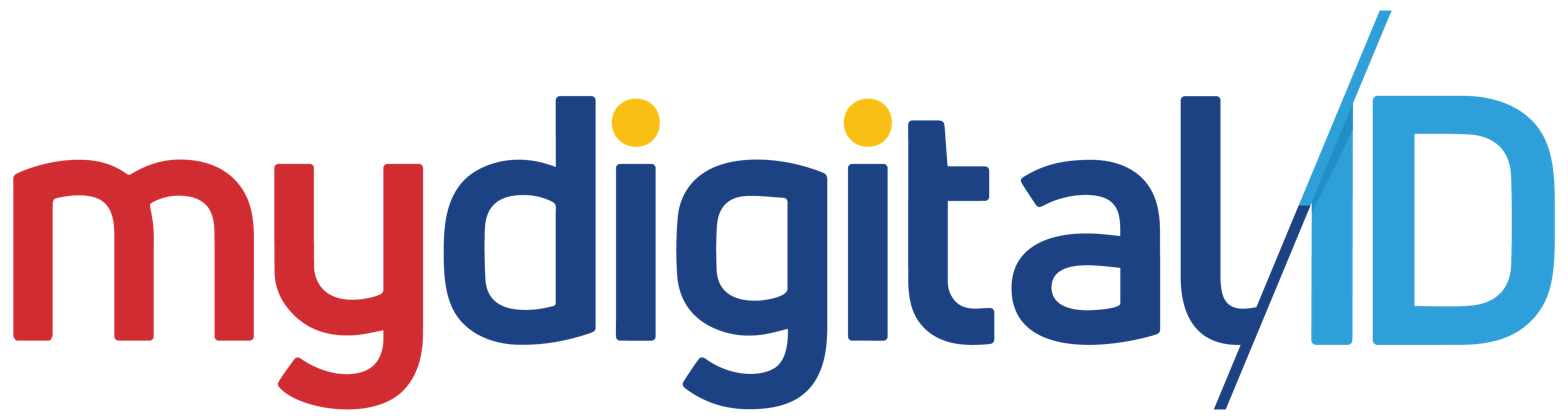
- Developer: My Digital ID Sdn Bhd
- Release: 2 August 2024; 2 years ago
- Operating system: Android iOS
- Available in: English; Malay
- Website: digital-id.my

MyDigital ID is a Malaysian government digital identity platform, developed by the strategic government agency My Digital ID Sdn Bhd, a company owned by the Minister of Finance Incorporated, to make online identity verification more secure and simple without replacing the Malaysian identity card (MyKad) system. It offers a single sign-on system for Malaysians to use for accessing online services. MyDigital ID does not store any personal information itself and will not replace Malaysian identity cards as identification documents.

As of February 2026, MyDigital ID registrations have reached almost 10 million. My Digital ID Sdn Bhd aims to have at least 17 million account registrations by the end of 2026.
