= Ministry of Transport (Malaysia) =

Government ministry of Malaysia

- Kementerian Pengangkutan (MOT) كمنترين ڤڠڠكوتن
- Coat of arms of Malaysia

Ministry overview
- Formed: 1978; 48 years ago
- Preceding Ministry: Ministry of Communications
- Jurisdiction: Government of Malaysia
- Headquarters: No. 26, Tun Hussein Road, Precinct 4, Federal Government Administrative Centre, 62100 Putrajaya
- Motto: Sustainable Transport The Heart of National Development (Pengangkutan Mampan Nadi Pembangunan Negara)
- Employees: 12,600 (2017)
- Annual budget: MYR 6,767,918,800 (2026)
- Minister responsible: Anthony Loke Siew Fook, Minister of Transport
- Deputy Minister responsible: Datuk Haji Hasbi bin Habibollah, Deputy Minister of Transport
- Ministry executives: Dato' Seri Jana Santhiran Muniayan, Secretary-General; Dato' Normah binti Osman, Deputy Secretary-General (Policy); Dr Nor Fuad bin Abdul Hamid, Deputy Secretary-General (Management)
- Website: www.mot.gov.my

The Ministry of Transport (Malay: Kementerian Pengangkutan; Jawi: كمنترين ڤڠڠكوتن), abbreviated MOT, is a ministry of the Government of Malaysia that is responsible for transport: road transport, civil aviation, road safety, port authority, maritime, air accident investigation, logistic and maritime safety. The ministry is headquartered in Putrajaya.

The Minister of Transport administers his functions through the Ministry of Transport and a range of other government agencies.

== Organization ==
- Minister of Transport
  - Under the Authority of Minister
    - Air Accident Investigation Bureau
  - Deputy Minister
    - Secretary-General
      - Under the Authority of Secretary-General
        - Internal Audit Unit
        - Legal Advisor Office
        - Corporation Communication Unit
        - Integrity Unit
        - Key Performance Indicator Unit
      - Deputy Secretary-General (Policy)
        - Strategic Planning and International Division
        - Maritime Division
        - Aviation Division
        - Logistic and Land Transport Division
      - Deputy Secretary-General (Management)
        - Human Resource Management Division
        - Administration and Finance Division
        - Development Division
        - Account Division
        - Information Management Division

=== Federal departments ===
1. Road Transport Department Malaysia, or Jabatan Pengangkutan Jalan Malaysia (JPJ).
2. Civil Aviation Authority of Malaysia (CAAM), or Pihak Berkuasa Penerbangan Awam Malaysia.
3. Marine Department Malaysia, or Jabatan Laut Malaysia (JLM).
4. Road Safety Department of Malaysia (RSDM), or Jabatan Keselamatan Jalan Raya Malaysia (JKJR).
5. Sabah Commercial Vehicle Licensing Board (CVLB), or Lembaga Pelesenan Kenderaan Perdagangan Sabah (LPKP Sabah).
6. Sarawak Commercial Vehicle Licensing Board (CVLD), or Lembaga Pelesenan Kenderaan Perdagangan Sarawak (LPKP Sarawak).

=== Federal agencies ===
1. Maritime Institute of Malaysia (MIMA), or Institut Maritim Malaysia.
2. Malaysian Institute of Road Safety Research (MIROS), or Institut Penyelidikan Keselamatan Jalan Raya Malaysia.
3. Penang Port Commission (PPC), or Suruhanjaya Pelabuhan Pulau Pinang (SPPP).
4. Port Klang Authority (PKA), or Lembaga Pelabuhan Klang (LPK).
5. Johor Port Authority, or Lembaga Pelabuhan Johor (LPJ).
6. Bintulu Port Authority (BPA), or Lembaga Pelabuhan Bintulu.
7. Kuantan Port Authority, or Lembaga Pelabuhan Kuantan (LPKtn).
8. Railway Assets Corporation (RAC), or Perbadanan Aset Keretapi.
9. Road Safety Council of Malaysia, or Majlis Keselamatan Jalan Raya Malaysia (MKJR).

== Functions ==
- To plan, formulate and implement policies for maritime transport, rail, ports and civil aviation.
- Infrastructure projects, rail, maritime, ports and civil aviation.
- Coordinate the integration between transport modes to achieve seamless travel.
- Provides licensing services:
  - License/permit the operation of the service provider and the holder of the concession (except commercial vehicle road).
  - Individual license-private/commercial vehicle drivers, pilot and others.
  - Domestic shipping license.
- Registration of all modes of vehicles.
- Determine pricing policy (except commercial vehicle road).
- Regulate the policies and operations of the concessionaire/government companies.
- Verification/monitoring service standards, security (service and safety standards) and legislation.
- Implementing regional and international co-operation in the field of transport.

== Ministers ==
Minister	Portrait	Office	Executive Experience
Anthony Loke Siew Fook		Minister of Transport	MLA for Lobak (March 1999 – May 2013); MP for Rasah (March 2008 – May 2013); MLA for Chennah (May 2013 – current); MP for Seremban (May 2013 – current); Minister of Transport (May 2018 – February 2020; December 2022 – current)
Hasbi Habibollah		Deputy Minister of Transport	MP for Limbang (March 2008 – current); Deputy Minister of Transport (March 2020 – August 2021; December 2022 – current); Deputy Minister of Rural Development (August 2021 – November 2022)

== See also ==
- Minister of Transport (Malaysia)
