= Malaysian identity card =

National identity card of Malaysia

Malaysian Identity Card
- Type: Identity card
- Issued by: National Registration Department of Malaysia, Ministry of Home Affairs
- First issued: 1948; 2001 (MyKad)
- Purpose: Identification
- Valid in: Malaysia
- Eligibility: Malaysian citizenship, and age 12+
- Cost: MyKad and MyTentera: RM10 application fee and in case of damage, RM100 to RM1000 in case of loss MyPR and MyKAS (Non-Citizens): RM40 application fee and in case of damage, RM100 to RM1000 in case of loss

The Malaysian identity card (Malay: kad pengenalan Malaysia) is the compulsory identity card for Malaysian citizens aged 12 and above. The current identity card, known as MyKad, was introduced by the National Registration Department of Malaysia on 5 September 2001 as one of four MSC Malaysia flagship applications and a replacement for the High Quality Identity Card (Kad Pengenalan Bermutu Tinggi), Malaysia became the first country in the world to use an identification card that incorporates both photo identification and fingerprint biometric data on an in-built computer chip embedded in a piece of plastic. The main purpose of the card as a validation tool and proof of citizenship other than the birth certificate, MyKad may also serve as a valid driver's licence, an ATM card, an electronic purse, and a public key, among other applications, as part of the Malaysian Government Multipurpose Card (GMPC) initiative, if the bearer chooses to activate the functions.

Other cards which are currently in use or soon to be introduced in the GMPC initiative and share similar features are:

1. MyKid – for Malaysian citizens under age of 12 including newborns (non-compulsory);
2. MyTentera – for Malaysian Armed Forces personnel;
3. MyPR – for Non-citizens holding a permanent residency in Malaysia;
4. MyKAS – for Non-citizens or stateless living in Malaysia temporarily;

== Etymology ==
The term MyKad is a compound of two words with ambiguous meanings; namely My and Kad.

My can be:

- the ISO 3166-1 alpha-2 code for Malaysia; or
- the English word my

Kad can be:

- the Malay word for card; or
- the acronym for Kad Akuan Diri or Personal Identification Card; or
- the acronym for Kad Aplikasi Digital or Digital Application Card.

== Technical specifications of MyKad ==
The initial MyKad was a contact card solution developed and manufactured by IRIS Corporation. Made of PC with the dimensions in the ISO/IEC 7816 ID-1 format (standard credit card format), the initial card had a 32kb EEPROM (Electronically Erasable Programmable Read-Only Memory) embedded chip running on M-COS (MyKad Chip Operating System). In November 2002, the capacity was increased to 64kb.

The upgraded and current version of the MyKad is a hybrid card containing two chips for both contact and contactless interfaces. Currently, this hybrid type MyKad is only issued in Malaysian states that employ the Touch 'n Go application.

The MyKad chip has a data retention up to 20 years, while the card itself has a lifespan of 10 years and has been tested according to the ISO 10373 standard.

== Eligibility and adoption ==
All Malaysian citizens and permanent residents 12 years old or above are eligible for a MyKad. From 2001, it gradually replaced an older Malaysian Identity Card system, that had been in use since 1949 under British colonial rule, with the intention of becoming ubiquitous by 2007. Children are issued with a MyKid after birth. This card is "upgraded" to a MyKad on the 12th birthday. The MyKad must be replaced when a person reaches 18 years old, as it is a requirement that the photograph be "current".

Adoption was optional but was spurred by the waiving of the application fee of between RM20 and RM50 until 31 December 2005. As of 27 December 2005, 1,180,208 Malaysians still held an old identity card. After the waiving period ended on 31 December 2005, each new first-time application comes with a fee of RM10.

== Structure of the National Registration Identity Card Number (NRIC) ==
The current format of the Malaysian identity card number, introduced in 1990, features 12 digits separated into three block by hyphens, as illustrated below:

YYMMDD-PB-###G

The above format is the official format as printed on the official identity documents e.g. MyKad. However, for database purposes (e.g. sorting), the NRIC Number may have its hyphens omitted, hence:

YYMMDDPB###G

The first six digits YYMMDD signify the person's date of birth in the ISO 8601:2000 format; for example, a person born on 16 September 1963 would have 630916 as the first six digits of their identity card. A person born on 1 January 1900 would have 000101 as the first digits, same with a person born on 1 January 2000. In cases where the person's actual date of birth according to the Gregorian calendar is uncertain, the date on which the person first applied for a MyKad is used (which becomes the person's birthday for official purposes), noted by an asterisk (*).

PB, the seventh and eighth digit, based on the place of birth of the person, which will be referred from the birth certificate upon application of the MyKad.

###, the ninth through eleventh digit is the generic special number generated by the National Registration Department of Malaysia's computer system. Usually, a person born prior and in the year 1999 will have the number started with 5## or 6## or 7## while a person born after and in the year 2000 will have the number started with 0##. Sometimes, the number reaches 1##, 2## and even 3## for high birth rate areas.

On the back of the card, there is an additional 2-digit number after the 12-digit number to indicate the number of MyKad which a person previously held.

=== Place of birth ===
Prior to 2001, originally, any person who was born abroad used digit 71 or 72 in their identity card number (High Quality Identity Card), regardless with or without at least one legal ascendant with Malaysian citizenship. It is estimated that about 171,023 registered voters were born abroad and used digit 71 or 72 in MyKad.

However, since 2001, any baby who was born abroad after 2001 is referred according to their place of birth rather than general digit 71 or 72 in their MyKad. It also affected any person (including citizen or non-citizen) who was born abroad regardless of their year of birth; who applying MyKad without holding High Quality Identity Card after 2001. Despite that, if any person born abroad who already had High Quality Identity Card which means they registered their identity card before 2001, they still retain digit 71 or 72 to be used in their MyKad identity card number. High Quality Identity Card was in use as the Malaysia's identity card from 1990 to 2001. After 2001, a person with High Quality Identity Card is expected to renew their High Quality Identity Card with new MyKad.

PB	Place of birth (in Malaysia)
00	—N/a
01	Johor
02	Kedah
03	Kelantan
04	Malacca
05	Negeri Sembilan
06	Pahang
07	Penang
08	Perak
09	Perlis
10	Selangor
11	Terengganu
12	Sabah
13	Sarawak
14	Federal Territory of Kuala Lumpur
15	Federal Territory of Labuan
16	Federal Territory of Putrajaya
17	—N/a
18	—N/a
19	—N/a
20	—N/a
21	Johor
22	Johor
23	Johor
24	Johor
25	Kedah
26	Kedah
27	Kedah
28	Kelantan
29	Kelantan
30	Malacca
31	Negeri Sembilan
32	Pahang
33	Pahang
34	Penang
35	Penang
36	Perak
37	Perak
38	Perak
39	Perak
40	Perlis
41	Selangor
42	Selangor
43	Selangor
44	Selangor
45	Terengganu
46	Terengganu
47	Sabah
48	Sabah
49	Sabah
50	Sarawak
51	Sarawak
52	Sarawak
53	Sarawak
54	Federal Territory of Kuala Lumpur
55	Federal Territory of Kuala Lumpur
56	Federal Territory of Kuala Lumpur
57	Federal Territory of Kuala Lumpur
58	Federal Territory of Labuan
59	Negeri Sembilan

PB	Place of birth (outside Malaysia / abroad)
60	Brunei
61	Indonesia
62	Cambodia / Democratic Kampuchea / Kampuchea
63	Laos
64	Myanmar
65	Philippines
66	Singapore
67	Thailand
68	Vietnam
69	—N/a
70	—N/a
71	A person born outside Malaysia prior to 2001; Excluding those born abroad without holding High Quality Identity Card
72	A person born outside Malaysia prior to 2001; Excluding those born abroad without holding High Quality Identity Card
73	—N/a
74	China
75	India
76	Pakistan
77	Saudi Arabia
78	Sri Lanka
79	Bangladesh
80	—N/a
81	—N/a
82	Unknown state
83	Asia-Pacific American Samoa / Australia / Christmas Island / Cocos (Keeling) Islands / Cook Islands / Fiji / French Polynesia / Guam / Heard Island and McDonald Islands / Marshall Islands / Micronesia / New Caledonia / New Zealand / Niue / Norfolk Island / Papua New Guinea / Timor Leste / Tokelau / United States Minor Outlying Islands / Wallis and Futuna Islands
84	South America Anguilla / Argentina / Aruba / Bolivia / Brazil / Chile / Colombia / Ecuador / French Guinea / Guadeloupe / Guyana / Paraguay / Peru / South Georgia and the South Sandwich Islands / Suriname / Uruguay / Venezuela
85	Africa Algeria / Angola / Botswana / Burundi / Cameroon / Central African Republic / Chad / Congo-Brazzaville / Congo-Kinshasa / Djibouti / Egypt / Eritrea / Ethiopia / Gabon / Gambia / Ghana / Guinea / Kenya / Liberia / Malawi / Mali / Mauritania / Mayotte / Morocco / Mozambique / Namibia / Niger / Nigeria / Rwanda / Réunion / Senegal / Sierra Leone / Somalia / South Africa / Sudan / Swaziland / Tanzania / Togo / Tonga / Tunisia / Uganda / Western Sahara / Zaire / Zambia / Zimbabwe
86	Western Europe Armenia / Austria / Belgium / Cyprus / Denmark / Faroe Islands / Finland / France, Metropolitan / Germany / Germany, Democratic Republic / Germany, Federal Republic / Greece / Holy See (Vatican City) / Italy / Luxembourg / Malta / Mediterranean / Monaco / Netherlands / North Macedonia / Norway / Portugal / Republic of Moldova / Slovakia / Slovenia / Spain / Sweden / Switzerland / United Kingdom-Dependent Territories / United Kingdom-National Overseas / United Kingdom-Overseas Citizen / United Kingdom-Protected Person / United Kingdom-Subject
87	Britain / Great Britain / Ireland
88	Middle East Bahrain / Iran / Iraq / Palestine / Jordan / Kuwait / Lebanon / Oman / Qatar / Republic of Yemen / Syria / Turkey / United Arab Emirates / Yemen Arab Republic / Yemen People's Democratic Republic / Israel
89	Far East Japan / North Korea / South Korea / Taiwan
90	Caribbean Bahamas / Barbados / Belize / Costa Rica / Cuba / Dominica / Dominican Republic / El Salvador / Grenada / Guatemala / Haiti / Honduras / Jamaica / Martinique / Mexico / Nicaragua / Panama / Puerto Rico / Saint Kitts and Nevis / Saint Lucia / Saint Vincent and the Grenadines / Trinidad and Tobago / Turks and Caicos Islands / Virgin Islands (USA)
91	North America Canada / Greenland / Netherlands Antilles / Saint Pierre and Miquelon / United States of America
92	Eastern Europe Albania / Belarus / Bosnia and Herzegovina / Bulgaria / Byelorussia / Croatia / Czech Republic / Czechoslovakia / Estonia / Georgia / Hungary / Latvia / Lithuania / Montenegro / Poland / Republic of Kosovo / Romania / Russian Federation / Serbia / Ukraine
93	Afghanistan / Andorra / Antarctica / Antigua and Barbuda / Azerbaijan / Benin / Bermuda / Bhutan / Bora Bora / Bouvet Island / British Indian Ocean Territory / Burkina Faso / Cape Verde / Cayman Islands / Comoros / Dahomey / Equatorial Guinea / Falkland Islands / French Southern Territories / Gibraltar / Guinea-Bissau / Hong Kong / Iceland / Ivory Coast / Kazakhstan / Kiribati / Kyrgyzstan / Lesotho / Libya / Liechtenstein / Macau / Madagascar / Maghribi / Malagasy / Maldives / Mauritius / Mongolia / Montserrat / Nauru / Nepal / Northern Marianas Islands / Outer Mongolia / Palau / Palestine / Pitcairn Islands / Saint Helena / Saint Lucia / Saint Vincent and the Grenadines / Samoa / San Marino / São Tomé and Príncipe / Seychelles / Solomon Islands / Svalbard and Jan Mayen Islands / Tajikistan / Turkmenistan / Tuvalu / Upper Volta / Uzbekistan / Vanuatu / Vatican City / Virgin Islands (British) / Western Samoa / Yugoslavia
94	—N/a
95	—N/a
96	—N/a
97	—N/a
98	Stateless / Stateless Person Article 1/1954
99	Mecca / Neutral Zone / No Information / Refugee / Refugee Article 1/1951 / United Nations Specialized Agency / United Nations Organization / Unspecified Nationality

== Applications on passport ==
The MyKad project was developed was originally intended to have four functions:

- Identity card, including fingerprints and photo
- Driving licence
- Travel document in Malaysia and several neighbouring countries. However, a conventional passport is still required for international travel: the card is aimed at reducing congestion at the border by enabling the use of unmanned gates using biometric (fingerprint) identification.
- Storage of health information

=== Current applications ===
Four further applications were added before or during its initial release,

- e-cash, an "electronic wallet" system intended for low-value, high-volume transactions (the maximum limit is US$500)
- ATM integration
- Touch 'n Go, Malaysia's toll road tolling system and also public transport payment Users can transfer an amount of money into the cards so they can just use their MyKads to purchase a ticket for bus and train rides.
- Digital certificate, commonly known as Public Key Infrastructure (PKI), only supported by the 64Kb version (implemented by the end of 2002)

At this time, most of the functions are still not widely used because they are not widely promoted.

=== Future / proposed applications ===
The extensible design of the card may be leading to functionality creep. Further applications envisaged by the government include:

- Frequent travellers' card
- Merge with the Payment Multi-Purpose Card ('PMPC'), giving the MyKad credit and debit card functions that will pave the way for other financial uses

=== Personal identification ===
MyKad must be carried at all times. Failure to do so may incur a fine of between RM3,000 and RM20,000 or jail term of up to three years.

No unauthorised people, including security guards, are allowed to retain the MyKads of other people. Only those authorised by the National Registration Department, like the police and immigration officers, can do so.

For Muslim citizens, "Islam" is printed on the card below the picture of the holder. This is to help the enforcement of Sharia law which is only applicable to Muslims.

As the state of Sabah and Sarawak maintain separate immigration controls, citizens who have permanent residency in the state of Sabah and Sarawak are denoted by the letters "H" and "K" respectively on the bottom right corner of the card.

=== Public Key Infrastructure (PKI) ===
MyKad's Public Key Infrastructure (PKI) application allows for two digital certificates to be inserted. MyKad holders can apply and purchase the digital certificates from two of Malaysia's certification authority, MSCTrustgate.com Sdn. Bhd. and DigiCert Sdn. Bhd..

PKI allows for easy securing of private data over public telecommunications networks, thus allowing, secure electronic transactions over the Internet which include:

- Online submission of tax returns
- Internet banking
- Secure email

=== MyKad as a travel document ===
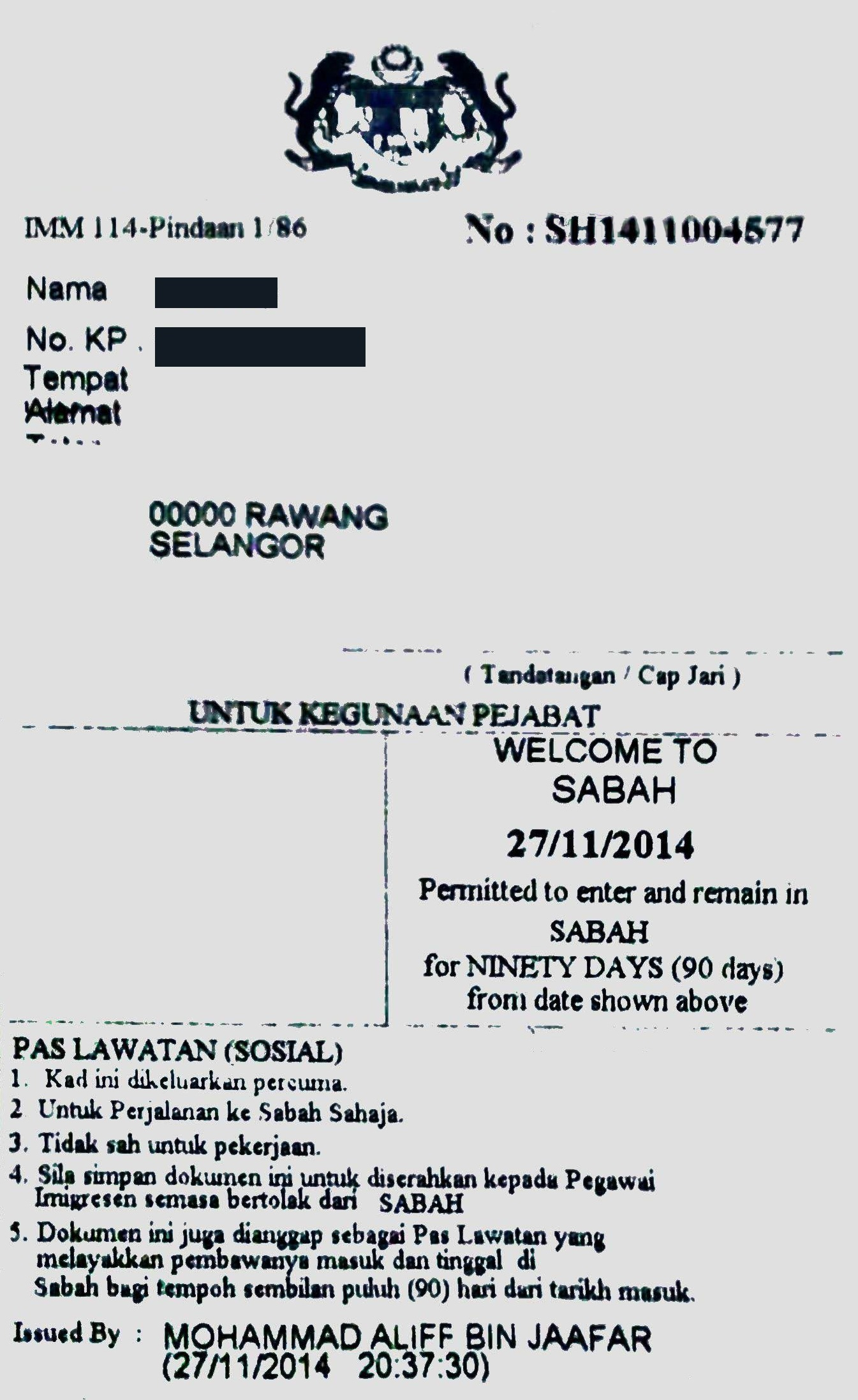
Paper slip of IMM.114

Citizens from Peninsular Malaysia travelling to Sabah, Sarawak and Labuan can produce a MyKad on arrival to obtain a Document in Lieu of Internal Travel Document (IMM.114) for social and business visits not more than three months. Sabah and Sarawak each maintains a separate immigration control system, and Peninsular Malaysians are subject to immigration control in the two states and Federal Territories.

Malaysia and Brunei signed a frequent travellers cards (FTC) agreement on 10 September 2007, allowing Malaysian and Bruneian frequent travellers to register to use their national identity cards for travel between Malaysia and Brunei.

As Malaysia stopped issuing and renewing Restricted Passports for citizens from Peninsular Malaysia to travel to Singapore beginning 1 January 2005, Malaysia considered negotiating with Singapore to allow frequent Malaysian travellers to enter Singapore using MyKad. However, Singapore rejected the use of MyKad by frequent Malaysian travellers to enter the country, citing security concerns.

=== MyID ===
The MyID is a Malaysian Government initiative that implements the National Registration Identity Card Number as the sole reference number for Malaysians in their transactions as an individual with the government agencies.

== Other cards with similar MyKad features ==
=== MyKid ===
MyKid is a chip-based children identity card or personal identification document issued to children under the age of 12. Introduced on 1 January 2003, MyKid contains features similar to MyKad except that it does not include a photograph and thumbprint biometric data. For registration of new birth, MyKid will be processed during the application for registration of birth. Children born before 2003 do not get a MyKid.

The term Kid refers to:

- Alternative word for child in the English language; or
- Acronym for Kad Identiti Diri or Personal Identification Card.

MyKid is issued in pink instead of blue (colour of MyKad). Visible data for MyKid in block letters include:

- The heading Kad Pengenalan Kanak-kanak Malaysia
- NRIC Numbers
- Full name
- Permanent address
- Gender
- Citizenship status
- Legal ascendant(s) religion

The MyKid chip currently stores only three types of data:

- Birth data e.g., information on legal ascendant(s)
- Health information e.g., immunisation records
- Education information e.g., enrolment in schools

=== MyPR ===
MyPR is an identity card or personal identification issued to residents of Malaysia with permanent resident status. All residents of Malaysia with permanent resident status are required to change their identity card to MyPR with effect from 1 June 2006. The MyPR is red and visible data include:

- The heading: Malaysia Permanent Resident Identity Card (Malay: Kad Pengenalan Malaysia Pemastautin Tetap)
- Full name
- NRIC number
- Permanent address
- Gender
- Permanent residence status

It's known colloquially as "IC Merah", as it has a distinctively red appearance on it.

=== MyKAS ===
MyKAS is a temporary resident identity card issued under Regulation 5 (3) of the National Registration Regulations 1990. It is green with expiry date indicated on the card.

MyKAS must be renewed within five years.

=== MyTentera ===
The MyTentera will replace the current BAT C 10 document (Malay: Borang Angkatan Tentera C 10) (Armed Forces Form C 10).

The MyTentera will be silver and feature the Malaysian Armed Forces logo at the back top-right corner. It will also contain a 12-digit military identification number similar to the NRIC Number.

=== MyPoca ===
MyPoca is a brown-colour identity card issued to those registered under the Prevention of Crime Act 1959 (POCA), who are usually ex-convicts. This identity card is only issued in Peninsular Malaysia before 2014 as POCA does not apply to Sabah and Sarawak before 2014. The brown-colour identity card system has been in existence as early as 1959 when the National Registration Act 1959 was enacted.

In 2017, the legal provisions requiring MyPoca to be issued to ex-convicts were abolished. However, there are conflicting reports suggesting that MyPoca is still in use even after its abolition in 2017.
