= Driving licence in Malaysia =

Malaysian driving licence Lesen Memandu Malaysia - LMM
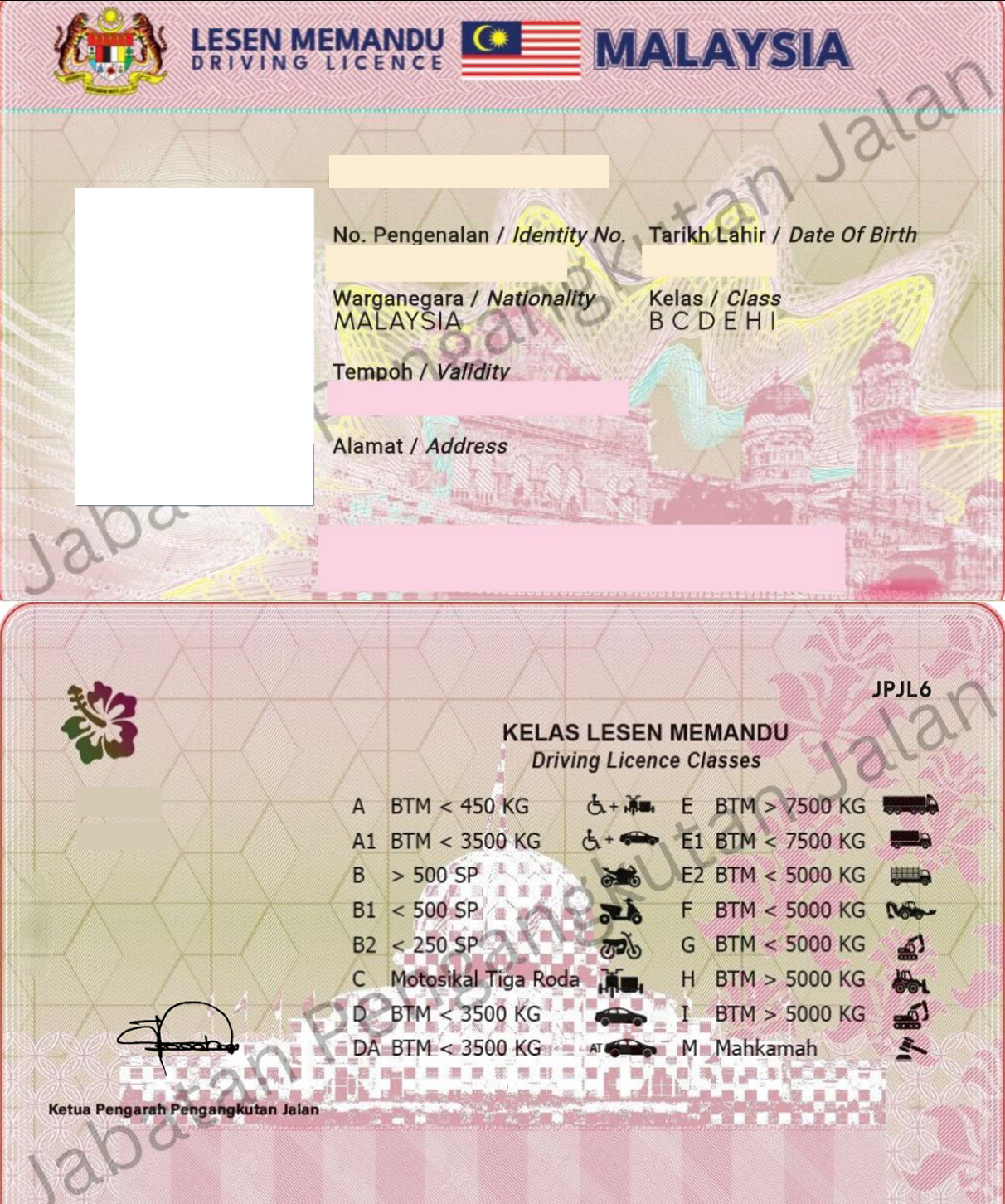
- Competent driving licence in Malaysia

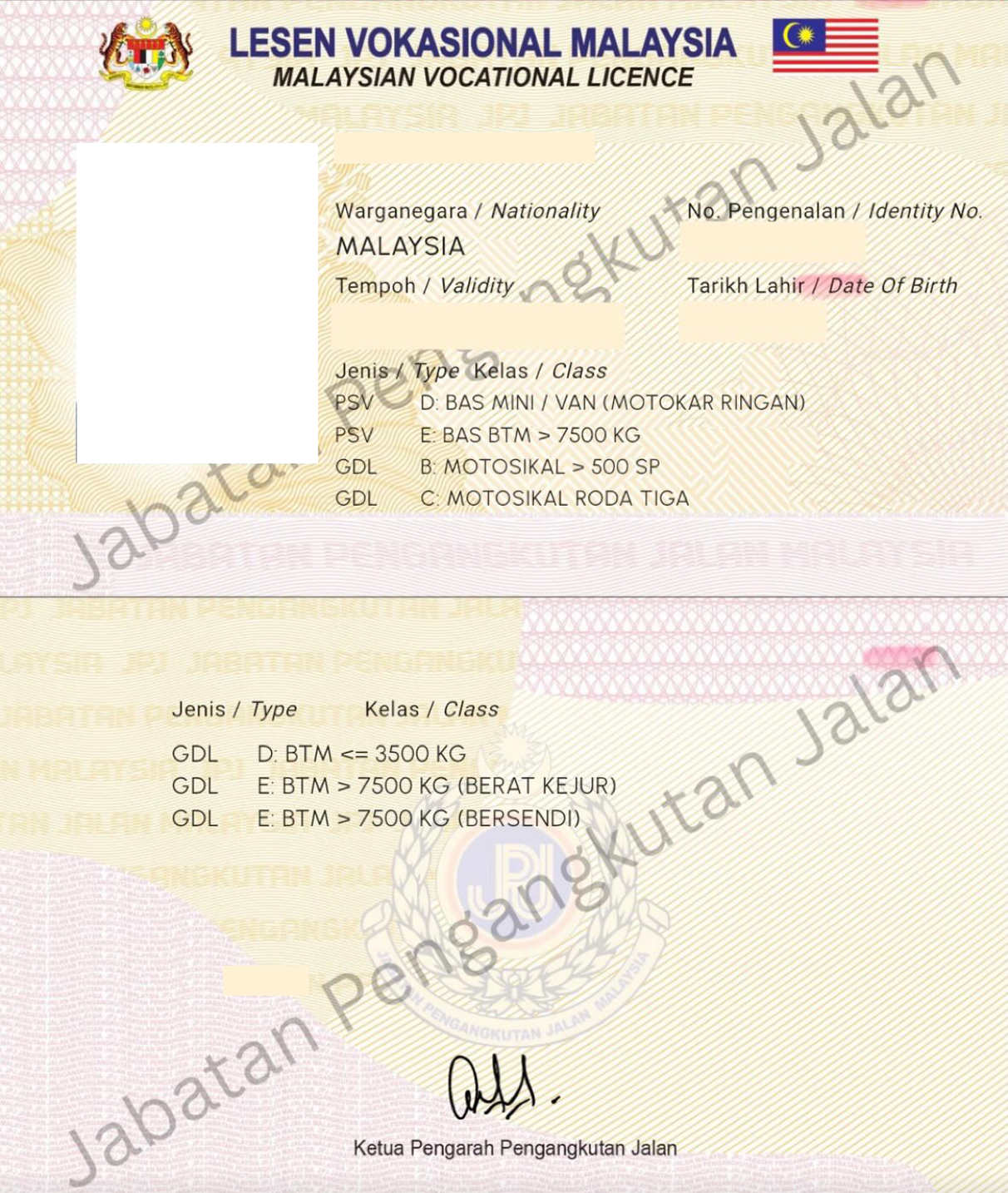
- Vocational driving licence in Malaysia
- Type: Driving licence
- Issued by: Road Transport Department Malaysia
- Purpose: Authorisation

A driving licence is required in Malaysia (Malay: Lesen Memandu Malaysia - LMM) before a person is allowed to drive a motor vehicle of any description on a road in Malaysia under Section 26(1) of the Road Transport Act 1987 (Act 333). Under section 26(1) of the Road Transport Act, an individual must possess a valid driving licence before being permitted to drive on the road, or can be prosecuted under section 26(2). Upon conviction, the miscreant is liable to fines or jail or both. Driving licence holders are subject to all traffic rules stated in the Road Transport Act 1987.

== Types ==
=== Learner's Driving Licence (LDL) ===
The Learner's Driving Licence (Malay: Lesen Belajar Memandu) must be possessed by learners in driving schools. They must first attend a 6 hour of KPP01 class or also known as Safety Driving Theory, then they must pass the Section I computer examination or also known as Road Laws and Safety Driving Test.

Licence holders are only permitted to drive car displaying the L plate owned by driving schools under the supervision of a driving school instructor. For motorcycle learner's licence holders, they are permitted to ride a motorcycle without a pillion. The learner's licence may be renewed every 3 or 6 months but the licence cannot be possessed for more than 2 years. After the 2 years, the licence holders may go to Road Transport Department (JPJ) to attend KPP01 again.

=== Probationary Driving Licence (PDL) ===
The Probationary Driving Licence (Malay: Lesen Memandu Percubaan) is possessed by new drivers who have passed all the driving lesson procedures and tests. PDL holders also need to ensure to bring along driving licence when driving. New drivers are subject to the 20-point Road Safety System (KEJARA) demerit point system, where points will be deducted according to the types of traffic offences. The licence will be revoked after a probationary licence holder accumulates 20 demerit points.

Probationary drivers are required to display the probationary licence plate (marked with white capital P in square red background) at the front and back of their respective vehicles. A probationary licence may be upgraded to a full competent driving licence after 2 years, and a grace period of 1 year is given to upgrading the licence before the licence holder may need to restart the whole driving lesson procedures.

=== Competent Driving Licence (CDL) ===
A full-fledged driving licence (Malay: Lesen Memandu Kompeten) being upgraded from the probationary licence after 2 years. A competent driving licence may be renewed up to 10 years. A grace period of 3 years is given to renew the license before the licence holder may need to restart the whole driving lesson procedures. If the competent driving licence (CDL) holder for one licence class wants to add another driving licence class, then he or she does not have to undergo a probationary driving licence (PDL) period again.

=== Vocational Licence (VC) ===
The Vocational Licence (Malay: Lesen Vokasional) consists of three types of licence:

- Goods Driving Licence (GDL) (Malay: Lesen Memandu Barangan) is a licence to drive any commercially registered vehicle used for transporting goods such as rigid lorries, articulated lorries, panel van and other commercial vehicles which deliver goods.
- Public Service Vehicle (PSV) (Malay: Kenderaan Perkhidmatan Awam) is a vocational licence that allows the holder to drive any commercial vehicle used for bringing paid passengers such as taxi, limousine and bus. Starting 12 July 2019, e-hailing service drivers (e.g. Grab, Uber, InDrive etc.) must apply for PSV licence.
- Conductor's Licence (Malay: Lesen Konduktor) - no longer offered.

The vocational licence must be accompanied with the holder's competent driving licence and should have the classes of licence that is equivalent to his or her competent driving licence. Only applicants with Malaysian nationality or permanent resident with age not less than 21 years old and have a satisfactory level of health are allowed to apply for vocational licence. The renewal period allowed is 1 year only and applicants must submit their medical report each time they want to renew. If the vocational licence expires more than 3 years, applicants need to redo the test.

Sample of driving licences
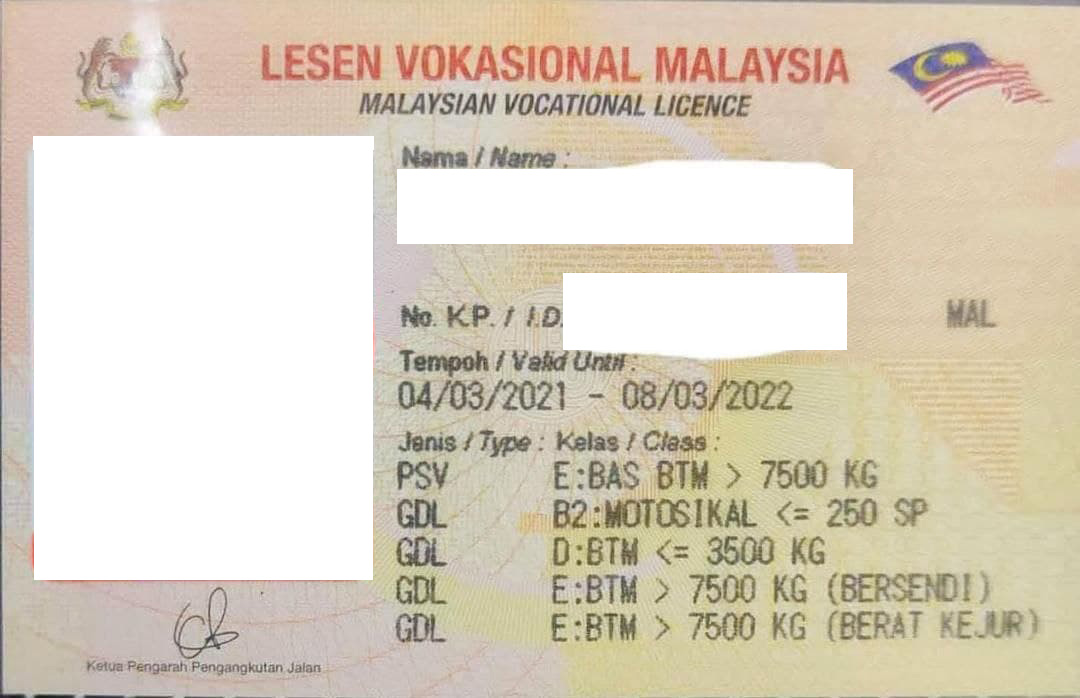
Physical Vocational Licence.

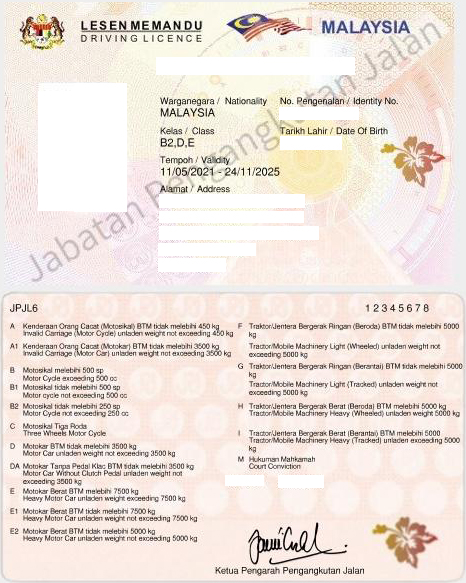
Competent Driving Licence (2013-2025).

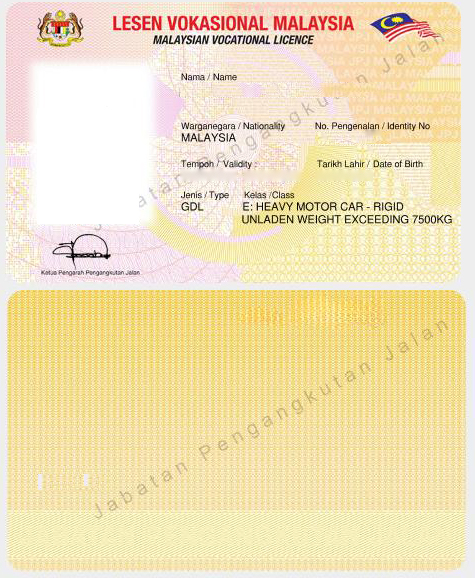
Vocational Licence (2013-2025).

== Classes ==
The following classes are printed on the new high security driving licence:

Class	Description	Minimum age	Notes
A	Invalid Carriage (Motorcycle) unladen weight not exceeding 450 kg	16	The applicant must submit a health check form for the application for a driving licence for disabled persons who have obtained the qualification verification to apply for a driving licence from a medical officer in a government health clinic as prescribed by the Ministry of Health. They also must drive a specially-modified vehicles throughout the driving lessons.
A1	Invalid Carriage (Motorcar) unladen weight not exceeding 3500 kg	17	The applicant must submit a health check form for the application for a driving licence for disabled persons who have obtained the qualification verification to apply for a driving licence from a medical officer in a government health clinic as prescribed by the Ministry of Health. They also must drive a specially-modified vehicles throughout the driving lessons.
B	Motorcycle exceeding 500 cc	16	Starting in 2024, those who have possessed B1 or B2 class licence for more than 10 years can upgrade their licence to B class, provided that they must attend a special driving lesson & does not possess any traffic summons or had been charged in court for any traffic offences under the Road Transport Act 1987.
B1	Motorcycle not exceeding 500 cc	16	Starting in 2024, those who have possessed B1 or B2 class licence for more than 10 years can upgrade their licence to B class, provided that they must attend a special driving lesson & does not possess any traffic summons or had been charged in court for any traffic offences under the Road Transport Act 1987.
B2	Motorcycle not exceeding 250 cc	16	Starting in 2024, those who have possessed B1 or B2 class licence for more than 10 years can upgrade their licence to B class, provided that they must attend a special driving lesson & does not possess any traffic summons or had been charged in court for any traffic offences under the Road Transport Act 1987.
C	Three-Wheeled Motorcycle	16	Starting in 2024, those who have possessed B1 or B2 class licence for more than 10 years can upgrade their licence to B class, provided that they must attend a special driving lesson & does not possess any traffic summons or had been charged in court for any traffic offences under the Road Transport Act 1987.
D	Motor Car unladen weight not exceeding 3500 kg	17	
DA	Motor Car Without Clutch Pedal unladen weight not exceeding 3500 kg	17	
E	Heavy Motor Car unladen weight exceeding 7500 kg	21	Have been holding class D (CDL) for at least one year. On March 1, 2022, 67,000 class E1 and E2 holders were transitioned to class E. Class E1 and E2 was no longer offered.
E1	Heavy Motor Car unladen weight not exceeding 7500 kg	21	Have been holding class D (CDL) for at least one year. On March 1, 2022, 67,000 class E1 and E2 holders were transitioned to class E. Class E1 and E2 was no longer offered.
E2	Heavy Motor Car unladen weight not exceeding 5000 kg	21	Have been holding class D (CDL) for at least one year. On March 1, 2022, 67,000 class E1 and E2 holders were transitioned to class E. Class E1 and E2 was no longer offered.
F	Tractor/Mobile Machinery Light (Wheeled) unladen weight not exceeding 5000 kg	21	
G	Tractor/Mobile Machinery Light (Tracked) unladen weight not exceeding 5000 kg	21	
H	Tractor/Mobile Machinery Heavy (Wheeled) unladen weight exceeding 5000 kg	21	
I	Tractor/Mobile Machinery Heavy (Tracked) unladen weight exceeding 5000 kg	21	
M	Court Conviction		

Vocational licence types and classes:

Type	Class
PSV	D: Taxi/ Luxury Taxi/ E-hailing
PSV	D: LIGHT MOTORCAR - MINI BUS / VAN
PSV	E: Bus unladen weight > 7500 kg
GDL	B2: Motorcycle <= 250 cc
GDL	B: Motorcycle > 500 cc
GDL	D: MOTOR CAR UNLADEN WEIGHT NOT EXCEEDING 3500 KG
GDL	E: HEAVY MOTOR CAR - RIGID UNLADEN WEIGHT EXCEEDING 7500 KG
GDL	E: HEAVY MOTOR CAR - ARTICULATED UNLADEN WEIGHT EXCEEDING 7500 KG

== Road Safety System (KEJARA) ==
This system is applicable to both Probationary and Competent driving licences. This system was introduced to:

1. Reduce accident rates.
2. To raise awareness of road safety towards all drivers.
3. Ensure all drivers to always obey the traffic laws.
4. Raise disciplined, responsible and cognizant drivers on the road.
5. Take legal actions towards any drivers whom had breached the laws.

Driving licence suspension system:

Accumulated demerit points	CDL Penalty	PDL Penalty	Endorsement
The first 20 points	Warning	12 months suspension	Points eliminated
The next 20 points	6 to 8 months suspension	N/A	Points eliminated
The next 20 points	8 to 10 months suspension	N/A	Points eliminated
The next 20 points	10 to 12 months suspension	N/A	Points eliminated

Drivers whose licence has been suspended three times in a period of five years will have their driving licence revoked and are not allowed to drive or receive a driver's licence for 12 months from the date of the licence was revoked.

Road penalties associated with KEJARA demerit points:

All vehicles other than buses and goods transporters	Goods transporters and buses	Offence
10 points	10 points	Driving under the influence of alcohol or narcotics.
10 points	10 points	Driving with a blood alcohol level beyond the set limit.
10 points	10 points	Reckless and dangerous driving
10 points	10 points	Failure to provide breath specimen when directed
10 points	10 points	Failure to provide breath, urine or blood specimen when directed
n/a	10 points	Carrying dangerous or potentially dangerous loads
n/a	10 points	Carrying loads that extend beyond the body of the vehicle
n/a	10 points	Carrying an improperly secured load
n/a	10 points	Carrying a load using an unsuitable transporter
4 points	5 points	Failure to obey a police officer, road official or traffic warden's instructions
4 points	6 points	Failure to observe a red light
4 points	6 points	Failure to observe a stop sign
4 points	6 points	Speeding:More than 40 km/h over limit
3 points	5 points	Speeding:Between 25 km/h and 40 km/h over limit
2 points	4 points	Speeding:Between 1 km/h and 25 km/h over limit
n/a	6 points	Overloading
n/a	6 points	Using a goods transporter as a people carrier
4 points	6 points	Improper use of emergency lane
4 points	6 points	Overtaking on the left
3 points	5 points	Failure to yield
3 points	5 points	Using a telephone or electronic device while driving
n/a	4 points	Operating a goods transporter on the rightmost lane
3 points	3 points	Failure to wear a safety belt
2 points	2 points	Riding without an approved safety helmet
5 points	n/a	Failing to bring driving licence along. (Learner & Probationary)
10 points	n/a	Failing to display the P stickers on vehicle. (Probationary)

== Conversion ==
Foreigners holding driving licences from countries with signatories to any treaty or agreement with Malaysia may apply for conversion of driving licence to drive in Malaysia. Meanwhile, citizens of a member state from the Association of Southeast Asian Nations (ASEAN) only need to possess a valid driving licence of their respective countries to drive in Malaysia, and do not require any conversions or an International Driving Permit (IDP).

== Digitalisation ==
MyJPJ app was introduced by the Road Transport Department in February 2023 for license to display their digital driving licence and road tax on their mobile devices as an alternative to carrying around their physical copies.

On February 10, it was announced that Malaysian-owned private vehicle owners will no longer be required to display their physical road tax on their windshield or carry it around. It was also announced that users are not required to download the MyJPJ application as it can be verified by the police.
