= Limbang (federal constituency) =

Federal constituency of Sarawak, Malaysia

Limbang (P221)
Sarawak constituency

Federal constituency
- Legislature: Dewan Rakyat
- MP: Hasbi Habibollah; GPS
- Constituency created: 2005
- First contested: 2008
- Last contested: 2022

Demographics
- Population (2020): 45,061
- Electors (2022): 41,999
- Area (km²): 4,211
- Pop. density (per km²): 10.7

Limbang is a federal constituency in Limbang Division (Limbang District), Sarawak, Malaysia, that has been represented in the Dewan Rakyat since 2008.

The federal constituency was created in the 2005 redistribution and is mandated to return a single member to the Dewan Rakyat under the first past the post voting system.

== Demographics ==
Ethnic breakdown of Limbang's electorate as of 2022
1. Dayak Orang Ulu including Bisaya & Lun Bawang (43.5%)
2. Malay-Muslim bumiputera (34.1%)
3. Chinese (17.9%)
4. Other ethnicities (4.50%)

As of 2020, Limbang has a population of 45,061 people.

Age breakdown of Limbang's electorate as of 2022
1. 18-20 (6.77%)
2. 21-29 (20.7%)
3. 30-39 (21.9%)
4. 40-49 (17.1%)
5. 50-59 (14.8%)
6. 60-69 (11.8%)
7. 70-79 (4.78%)
8. 80-89 (1.61%)
9. above 90 (0.55%)
Gender breakdown of Limbang's electorate as of 2022
1. Male (51.1%)
2. Female (48.9%)

== History ==
=== Polling districts ===
According to the Official Gazette dated 31 October 2022, the Limbang constituency has a total of 15 polling districts.

State constituency	Polling Districts	Code	Location
Bukit Kota（N79）	Ranggau	221/79/01	SK Limpakau Pinang
Bukit Kota（N79）	Sebukang	221/79/02	SK Limpaki; Dewan Kpg. Patiambun; Tadika Kemas Limbang
Bukit Kota（N79）	Tabahan	221/79/03	SK Kampung Pahlawan; SK Kubong; Dewan SK Batu 4 Jln Pandaruan
Bukit Kota（N79）	Bangkita	221/79/04	SK Melayu Pusat Limbang
Bukit Kota（N79）	Limbang	221/79/05	SJK (C) Chung Hua Limbang
Bukit Kota（N79）	Poyan	221/79/06	SK Sg. Poyan; Dewan PIBG, SK Melayu Pusat
Bukit Kota（N79）	Bukit Kota	221/79/07	Dewan Kpg. Buangsiol
Bukit Kota（N79）	Pendam	221/79/08	SK Gadong; Dewan Kpg. Pendam
Bukit Kota（N79）	Telahak	221/79/09	Dewan SK Telahak; Surau Kpg. Ipai; SK Meritam
Bukit Kota（N79）	Berawan	221/79/10	Dewan Inspirasi SMK Kubong; SK R.C. Kubong; Balai Raya Kpg. Batu Bakarang; Dewan SK Bukit Loba; SK Meramut; Surau (Halaman) Kpg. Pangkalan Rejab
Batu Danau (N80)	Danau	221/80/01	SK Batu Danau; Dewan Kpg. Bidang; Dewan Pengkalan Madang; SK Pangkalan Jawa; SK Kuala Awang
Batu Danau (N80)	Lubai	221/80/02	SK Kuala Penganan; SK Ng. Merit; RH Luta Engkasing Lubai; SK Menuang; RH Dampin Ak Layan Terimah; RH Sli Ak Mingan Mengari, Jalan Medamit
Batu Danau (N80)	Ukong	221/80/03	RH Liban; Dewan Kpg. Lubok Lasas; Dewan Kpg. Ukong; Dewan Serbaguna Kpg. Buloh Balui; SK Tanjong; Dewan Batu Danau
Batu Danau (N80)	Medihit	221/80/04	SK Lg. Napir; RH Lawai; RH Brain; RH Sing; SK Melaban; SK Ng. Medalam
Batu Danau (N80)	Medamit	221/80/05	RH Ekom Sepangah; Dewan Masyarakat Medamit; RH Akoh Karangan Medamit; RH Tan Anak Kayan; SK Bukit Batu

=== Representation history ===
Members of Parliament for Limbang
Parliament	No	Years	Member	Party	Vote Share
Constituency created from Bukit Mas
12th	P221	2008-2013	Hasbi Habibollah (حسبي بن حبيب الله)	BN (PBB)	6,427; 52.78%
13th	P221	2013-2018	Hasbi Habibollah (حسبي بن حبيب الله)	BN (PBB)	12,999; 73.45%
14th	P221	2018	Hasbi Habibollah (حسبي بن حبيب الله)	BN (PBB)	12,589; 72.07%
14th	P221	2018-2022	Hasbi Habibollah (حسبي بن حبيب الله)	GPS (PBB)	12,589; 72.07%
15th	P221	2022–present	Hasbi Habibollah (حسبي بن حبيب الله)	GPS (PBB)	14,897; 75.25%

=== State constituency ===
Parliamentary constituency	State constituency					
Parliamentary constituency	1969–1978	1978–1990	1990–1999	1999–2008	2008–2016	2016−present
Limbang					Batu Danau	
Limbang					Bukit Kota	

=== Historical boundaries ===
State Constituency	Area	
State Constituency	2005	2015
Batu Danau	Batu Danau; Kuala Peganam; Kuala Mendanam; Lubai; Nanga Medamit	
Bukit Kota	Bukit Kota; Kampung Bakol; Limbang; Pandaruan; Sebukang	

=== Current state assembly members ===
No.	State Constituency	Member	Coalition (Party)
N79	Bukit Kota	Abdul Rahman Ismail	GPS (PBB)
N80	Batu Danau	Paulus Gumbang	GPS (PBB)

=== Local governments & postcodes ===
No.	State Constituency	Local Government	Postcode
N79	Bukit Kota	Limbang District Council	98700 Limbang; 98750 Nanga Medamit
N80	Bukit Goram	Limbang District Council	98700 Limbang; 98750 Nanga Medamit

== Election results ==
Malaysian general election, 2022
Party	Candidate	Votes	%	∆%
GPS	Hasbi Habibollah	14,897	75.25	▲75.25
PH	Racha Balang	4,899	24.75	▲24.75
Total valid votes		19,796	100.00	
Total rejected ballots		228		
Unreturned ballots		106		
Turnout		20,130	47.13	▼20.28
Registered electors		41,999		
Majority		9,998	50.50	▲6.36
GPS gain from BN		Swing		?
Source(s) https://lom.agc.gov.my/ilims/upload/portal/akta/outputp/1753265/PARLIMEN%20SARAWAK%20(PUB%20620).pdf

Malaysian general election, 2018
Party	Candidate	Votes	%	∆%
BN	Hasbi Habibollah	12,589	72.07	▼1.38
PKR	Ricardo Osmund Yampil Baba	4,879	27.93	▲1.38
Total valid votes		17,468	100.00	
Total rejected ballots		201		
Unreturned ballots		133		
Turnout		17,802	67.41	▼6.37
Registered electors		26,409		
Majority		7,710	44.14	▼2.76
BN hold		Swing		
Source(s) "His Majesty's Government Gazette - Notice of Contested Election, Parliament for the State of Sarawak [P.U. (B) 247/2018]" (PDF). Attorney General's Chambers of Malaysia. 3 May 2018. "Federal Government Gazette - Results of Contested Election and Statements of the Poll after the Official Addition of Votes, Parliamentary Constituencies for the State of Sarawak [P.U. (B) 321/2018]" (PDF). Attorney General's Chambers of Malaysia. 28 May 2018. Archived from the original (PDF) on 2019-12-29.

Malaysian general election, 2013
Party	Candidate	Votes	%	∆%
BN	Hasbi Habibollah	12,999	73.45	▲20.67
PKR	Baru Bian	4,698	26.55	▼20.67
Total valid votes		17,697	100.00	
Total rejected ballots		162		
Unreturned ballots		53		
Turnout		17,912	73.78	
Registered electors		24,278		
Majority		8,301	46.90	▲41.34
BN hold		Swing		
Source(s) "Federal Government Gazette - Notice of Contested Election, Parliament for the State of Sarawak [P.U. (B) 184/2013]" (PDF). Attorney General's Chambers of Malaysia. 26 April 2013. Archived from the original (PDF) on 2018-09-30. "Federal Government Gazette - Results of Contested Election and Statements of the Poll after the Official Addition of Votes, Parliamentary Constituencies for the State of Sarawak [P.U. (B) 225/2013]" (PDF). Attorney General's Chambers of Malaysia. 22 May 2013. Archived from the original (PDF) on 2018-09-30.

Malaysian general election, 2008
Party	Candidate	Votes	%
BN	Hasbi Habibollah	6,427	52.78
PKR	Lau Liak Koi	5,751	47.22
Total valid votes		12,178	100.00
Total rejected ballots		113	
Unreturned ballots		89	
Turnout		12,380	60.94
Registered electors		20,315	
Majority		676	5.56
This was a new constituency created.
