= Malaysia National Aviation Policy =

The Malaysia National Aviation Policy is a comprehensive policy defining all the key aspects of aviation in Malaysia, such as its direction, objectives and long-term strategies, for the purpose of stakeholder transparency.

== History ==
The National Aviation Policy was first proposed and announced on 17 October 2011. The Transport Ministry was tasked with drafting the policy framework.

In 2010, before the announcement, the former CEO of MAS, Tengku Datuk Azmil Zahruddin, and AirAsia X CEO Azran Osman Rani, had called for a clear aviation policy for Malaysia, to ensure free and fair competition on a level playing field.

However, the then transport minister Datuk Seri Ong Tee Keat had shot down their call, saying that existing guidelines were sufficient.

== Details ==
=== Purpose ===
- To ensure the survival of the country's aviation players
- Define key aspects of aviation, direction, objectives and long-term strategies for all Malaysian Aviation stakeholder
- Fair route allocation

=== Key Actor ===
- Minister of Transport
  - Department of Civil Aviation
- MAS
- AirAsia
- Malindo Air
- MAHB
