= Minister of Transport (Malaysia) =

Malaysian government position

- Menteri Pengangkutan
- Incumbent; Vacant since 10 November 2026
- Ministry of Transport
- Style: Transport Minister (informal); The Honourable (within Malaysia and the Commonwealth)
- Abbreviation: MOT
- Member of: Cabinet
- Reports to: The Prime Minister
- Seat: Putrajaya
- Nominator: The Prime Minister
- Appointer: The Yang di-Pertuan Agong; (on the advice of the Prime Minister)
- Term length: At His Majesty's Pleasure
- Formation: 1955
- First holder: H. S. Lee
- Deputy: Hasbi Habibollah
- Salary: RM14,970
- Website: www.mot.gov.my

The minister of transport (Malay: Menteri Pengangkutan, Jawi: منتري ڤڠڠكوتن), also informally known as the transport minister, is a minister in the Government of Malaysia, with overall responsibility for the functions and objectives of the Ministry of Transport. The incumbent is a member of the Cabinet of Malaysia.

The current minister position is vacant after the resignation of Anthony Loke in protest of the conditional pardon given to Najib Razak. The current deputy minister of transport is Hasbi Habibollah and the corresponding shadow minister of transport is Khairil Nizam Khirudin.

== List of ministers of transport ==
The following individuals have been appointed as Minister of Transport, or any of its precedent titles:

Political party: Alliance/BN PH

Portrait	Name (Birth–Death) Constituency	Political party	Title	Took office	Left office	Deputy Minister	Prime Minister (Cabinet)
	H. S. Lee (1900–1988); Nominated	Alliance (MCA)	Minister of Transport	1 August 1955	31 August 1957	Vacant	Chief Minister of the Federation of Malaya; Tunku Abdul Rahman
	Abdul Rahman Talib (1916–1968); MP for Pahang Timor	Alliance (UMNO)	Minister of Transport	31 August 1957	7 October 1959	Vacant	Tunku Abdul Rahman (I)
	Sardon Jubir (1917–1985); MP for Pontian Utara	Alliance (UMNO)	Minister of Transport	18 November 1959	4 December 1968	Vacant	Tunku Abdul Rahman (II • III)
	V. Manickavasagam (1926–1979); MP for Klang	Alliance (MIC)	Minister of Transport	4 June 1969	20 September 1970	Vacant	Tunku Abdul Rahman (IV)
	Abdul Ghani Gilong (1932–2021); MP for Kinabalu	Alliance (USNO)	Minister of Transport	23 September 1970	1974	Vacant	Abdul Razak Hussein (I)
	V. Manickavasagam (1926–1979); MP for Pelabuhan Kelang	BN (MIC)	Minister of Works and Transport	5 September 1974	1976	Richard Ho Ung Hun	Abdul Razak Hussein (II)
	V. Manickavasagam (1926–1979); MP for Pelabuhan Kelang	BN (MIC)	Minister of Transport	1978	15 September 1979	Goh Cheng Teik	Hussein Onn (II)
	Lee San Choon (1935–2023); MP for Segamat (1974-1982); MP for Seremban (1982-1983)	BN (MCA)	Minister of Transport	1 November 1979	31 March 1983	Goh Cheng Teik (1979–1981); Abu Hassan Omar (1981–1983)	Hussein Onn (II); Mahathir Mohamad (I • II)
	Chong Hon Nyan (1924–2020); MP for Batu Berendam	BN (MCA)	Minister of Transport	2 June 1983	6 January 1986	Abu Hassan Omar (1983–1984); Rahmah Othman (1984–1986)	Mahathir Mohamad (II)
	Ling Liong Sik (1943–2026); MP for Mata Kuching (1986); MP for Labis (1986-2003)	BN (MCA)	Minister of Transport	7 January 1986	25 May 2003	Rahmah Othman (1986–1987); Zaleha Ismail (1987–1995); Mohd Ali Rustam (1995–1996); Ibrahim Saad (1996–1999); Ramli Ngah Talib (1999–2003); Douglas Uggah Embas (2001–2003)	Mahathir Mohamad (II • III • IV • V • VI)
	Chan Kong Choy (b. 1955); MP for Selayang	BN (MCA)	Minister of Transport	1 July 2003	9 March 2008	Ramli Ngah Talib (2003–2004); Douglas Uggah Embas (2003–2008); Tengku Azlan (2004–2008)	Mahathir Mohamad (VI); Abdullah Ahmad Badawi (I • II)
	Ong Tee Keat (b. 1956); MP for Pandan	BN (MCA)	Minister of Transport	18 March 2008	3 June 2010	Lajim Ukin (2008–2009); Abdul Rahim Bakri (2009–2010); Robert Lau (2009–2010)	Abdullah Ahmad Badawi (III); Najib Razak (I)
	Kong Cho Ha (b. 1950); MP for Lumut	BN (MCA)	Minister of Transport	4 June 2010	5 May 2013	Abdul Rahim Bakri (2010–2013); Jelaing Mersat (2010–2013)	Najib Razak (I)
	Hishammuddin Hussein (b. 1961); MP for Sembrong; Acting	BN (UMNO)	Acting Minister of Transport	16 May 2013	24 June 2014	Abdul Aziz Kaprawi	Najib Razak (II)
	Liow Tiong Lai (b. 1961); MP for Bentong	BN (MCA)	Minister of Transport	27 June 2014	9 May 2018	Abdul Aziz Kaprawi	Najib Razak (II)
	Anthony Loke Siew Fook (b. 1977); MP for Seremban	PH (DAP)	Minister of Transport	21 May 2018	24 February 2020	Kamarudin Jaffar	Mahathir Mohamad (VII)
	Wee Ka Siong (b. 1968); MP for Ayer Hitam	BN (MCA)	Minister of Transport	10 March 2020	24 November 2022	Hasbi Habibollah (2020–2021); Henry Sum Agong (2021–2022)	Muhyiddin Yassin (I); Ismail Sabri Yaakob (I)
	Anthony Loke Siew Fook (b. 1977); MP for Seremban	PH (DAP)	Minister of Transport	3 December 2022	10 November 2026	Hasbi Habibollah	Anwar Ibrahim (I)
