= Hasbi Habibollah =

Malaysian politician and engineer

Yang Berhormat Datuk Hasbi Habibollah PMW JBS JSM MP
- حسبي بن حبيب الله

Deputy Minister of Transport
- Incumbent
- Assumed office 10 December 2022
- Monarchs: Abdullah (2022–2024); Ibrahim Iskandar (since 2024)
- Prime Minister: Anwar Ibrahim
- Minister: Anthony Loke Siew Fook
- Preceded by: Henry Sum Agong
- Constituency: Limbang
- In office 10 March 2020 – 16 August 2021
- Monarch: Abdullah
- Prime Minister: Muhyiddin Yassin
- Minister: Wee Ka Siong
- Preceded by: Kamaruddin Jaffar
- Succeeded by: Henry Sum Agong
- Constituency: Limbang

Deputy Minister of Rural Development II
- In office 30 August 2021 – 24 November 2022 Serving with Abdul Rahman Mohamad
- Monarch: Abdullah
- Prime Minister: Ismail Sabri Yaakob
- Minister: Mahdzir Khalid
- Preceded by: Henry Sum Agong
- Succeeded by: Rubiah Wang (Deputy Minister of Rural and Regional Development)
- Constituency: Limbang

Member of the Malaysian Parliament for Limbang
- Incumbent
- Assumed office 8 March 2008
- Preceded by: Position established
- Majority: 676 (2008); 8,301 (2013); 7,710 (2018); 9,998 (2022)

Personal details
- Born: Hasbi bin Habibollah; 2 January 1963 (age 63) Limbang, Crown Colony of Sarawak (now Sarawak, Malaysia)
- Party: Parti Pesaka Bumiputera Bersatu (PBB) (since 2008)
- Other political affiliations: Barisan Nasional (BN) (2008–2018); Gabungan Parti Sarawak (GPS) (since 2018)
- Occupation: Politician
- Profession: Engineer

Hasbi bin Habibollah (Jawi: حسبي بن حبيب الله; born 2 January 1963) is a Malaysian politician and engineer who has served as the Deputy Minister of Transport for the second term in the Unity Government administration under Prime Minister Anwar Ibrahim and Minister Anthony Loke Siew Fook since December 2022 and the Member of Parliament (MP) for Limbang since March 2008. He served the first term in the Perikatan Nasional (PN) administration under former prime minister Muhyiddin Yassin and former Minister Wee Ka Siong from March 2020 to the collapse of the PN administration in August 2021 and the Deputy Minister of Rural Development II in the Barisan Nasional (BN) administration under former prime minister Ismail Sabri Yaakob and former Minister Mahdzir Khalid from August 2021 to the collapse of BN administration in November 2022. He is a member of the Parti Pesaka Bumiputera Bersatu (PBB), a component party of the Gabungan Parti Sarawak (GPS) and formerly the BN coalitions.

Hasbi was previously an engineer before being elected to the Parliament by a narrow margin in the 2008 general election for the newly created seat of Limbang. He managed to retain the seat in the 2013 and 2018 general elections.

== Election results ==
Parliament of Malaysia
Year	Constituency	Candidate	Votes	Pct	Opponent(s)	Votes	Pct	Ballots cast	Majority	Turnout
2008	P221 Limbang	Hasbi Habibollah (PBB)	6,427	52.78%	Lau Liak Koi (PKR)	5,751	47.22%	12,290	676	60.94%
2013	P221 Limbang	Hasbi Habibollah (PBB)	12,999	73.45%	Baru Bian (PKR)	4,698	26.55%	17,859	8,301	73.78%
2018	P221 Limbang	Hasbi Habibollah (PBB)	12,589	72.07%	Ricardo Osmund Yampil Baba (PKR)	4,879	27.93%	17,669	7,710	67.41%
2022	P221 Limbang	Hasbi Habibollah (PBB)	14,897	75.25%	Racha Balang (PKR)	4,899	24.75%	20,130	9,998	47.13%

== Honours ==
=== Honours of Malaysia ===
- Malaysia
  - Companion of the Order of Loyalty to the Crown of Malaysia (JSM) (2016)
  - Recipient of the 17th Yang di-Pertuan Agong Installation Medal
- Federal Territory (Malaysia)
  - Commander of the Order of the Territorial Crown (PMW) – Datuk (2021)
- Sarawak
  - Companion of the Most Exalted Order of the Star of Sarawak (JBS)
  - Gold Medal of the Sarawak Independence Diamond Jubilee Medal (2023)
